= Neuvy-au-Houlme =

- Commune
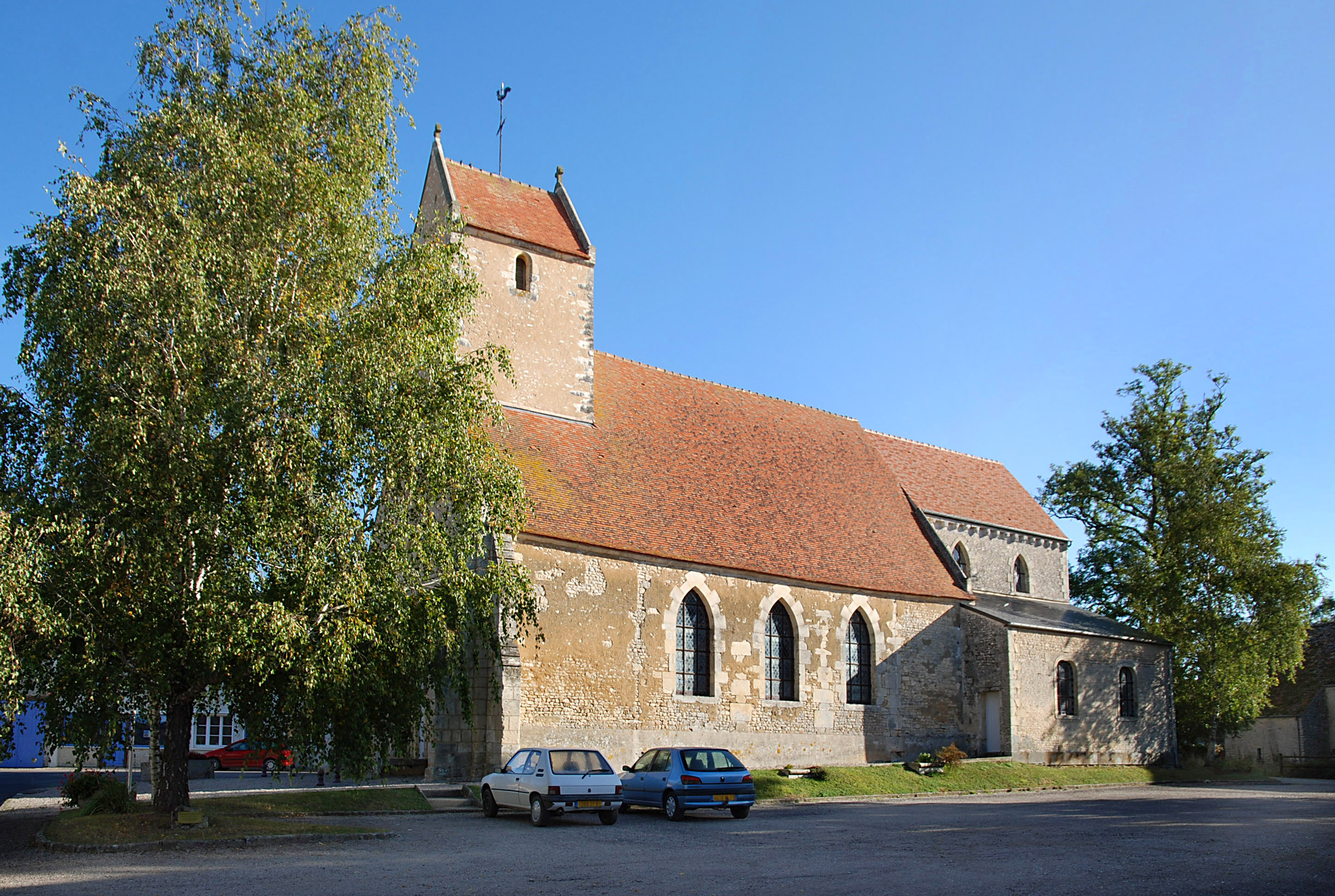
- The church in Neuvy-au-Houlme
- Location of Neuvy-au-Houlme
- Location within France Location within Normandy
- Coordinates: 48°49′05″N 0°11′54″W
- Country: France
- Region: Normandy
- Department: Orne
- Arrondissement: Argentan
- Canton: Athis-Val de Rouvre
- Intercommunality: Val d'Orne

Government
  - Mayor (2020–2026): Isabelle Moiteaux
- Area^{1}: 15.62 km^{2} (6.03 sq mi)
- Elevation: 170 m (560 ft)
- Highest elevation: 251 m (823 ft)
- Lowest elevation: 148 m (486 ft)
- Population (2023): 195
  - Density: 12.5/km^{2} (32.3/sq mi)
- Time zone: UTC+01:00 (CET)
  - Summer (DST): UTC+02:00 (CEST)
- INSEE/Postal code: 61308 /61210
- ^{1} French Land Register data, which excludes lakes, ponds, glaciers > 1 km^{2} (0.386 sq mi or 247 acres) and river estuaries.

Neuvy-au-Houlme (French pronunciation: [nøvi o ulm]) is a commune in the Orne department in northwestern France. The inhabitants of Neuvy-au-Houlme are called les Neuviens or les Neuviennes.

== Geography ==
The commune of Neuvy-au-Houlme is part of the area known as Suisse Normande.

The commune is made up of the following collection of villages and hamlets, Neuvy-au-Houlme and La Coquerie. The commune is spread over an area of 15.62 square kilometres (3,860 acres) with a maximum altitude of 251 metres (823 ft 6 in) and minimum of 148 metres (485 ft 7 in)

The river Baize runs through the commune, along with three of its tributaries, Bilaine, Ruisseau de la Fontaine Andre and Ruisseau des Vallees.

=== Land distribution ===
According to the 2018 CORINE Land Cover assessment the vast majority 51% (41 hectares (100 acres)) of the land of the commune is Meadows. The rest of the land is Arable land at 41%, 4% is artificial Green spaces, 2% Heterogeneous agricultural land and 2% is forest.

== Places of interest ==
Neuvy-au-Houlme is the site of the historic Thoroughbred horse breeding farm, Haras de Fresnay-le-Buffard, and the standardbred farm, Haras du Ribardon.

=== National heritage sites ===
Dolmen des Bignes is a Neolithic dolmen, on the communes border with Habloville that was classed as a Monument historique in 1931.

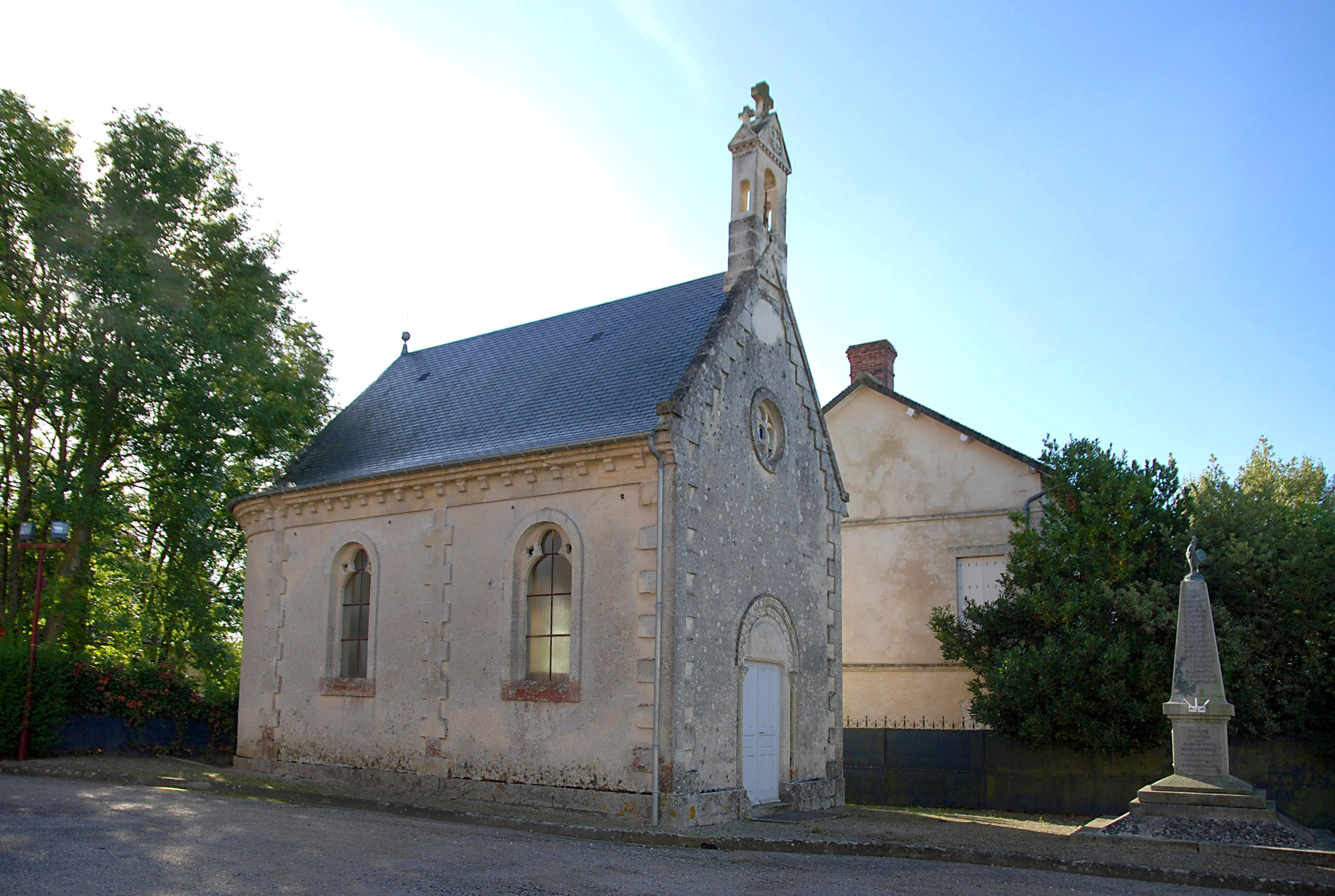
Chapelle of Saint-Clair de Neuvy-au-Houlme

== Notable people ==
- Églantine Rayer (born 2004) - a French professional racing cyclist while born in La Ferté Macé her family home was in this commune and she grew up here.

== See also ==
- Communes of the Orne department
