= Giel-Courteilles =

- Commune
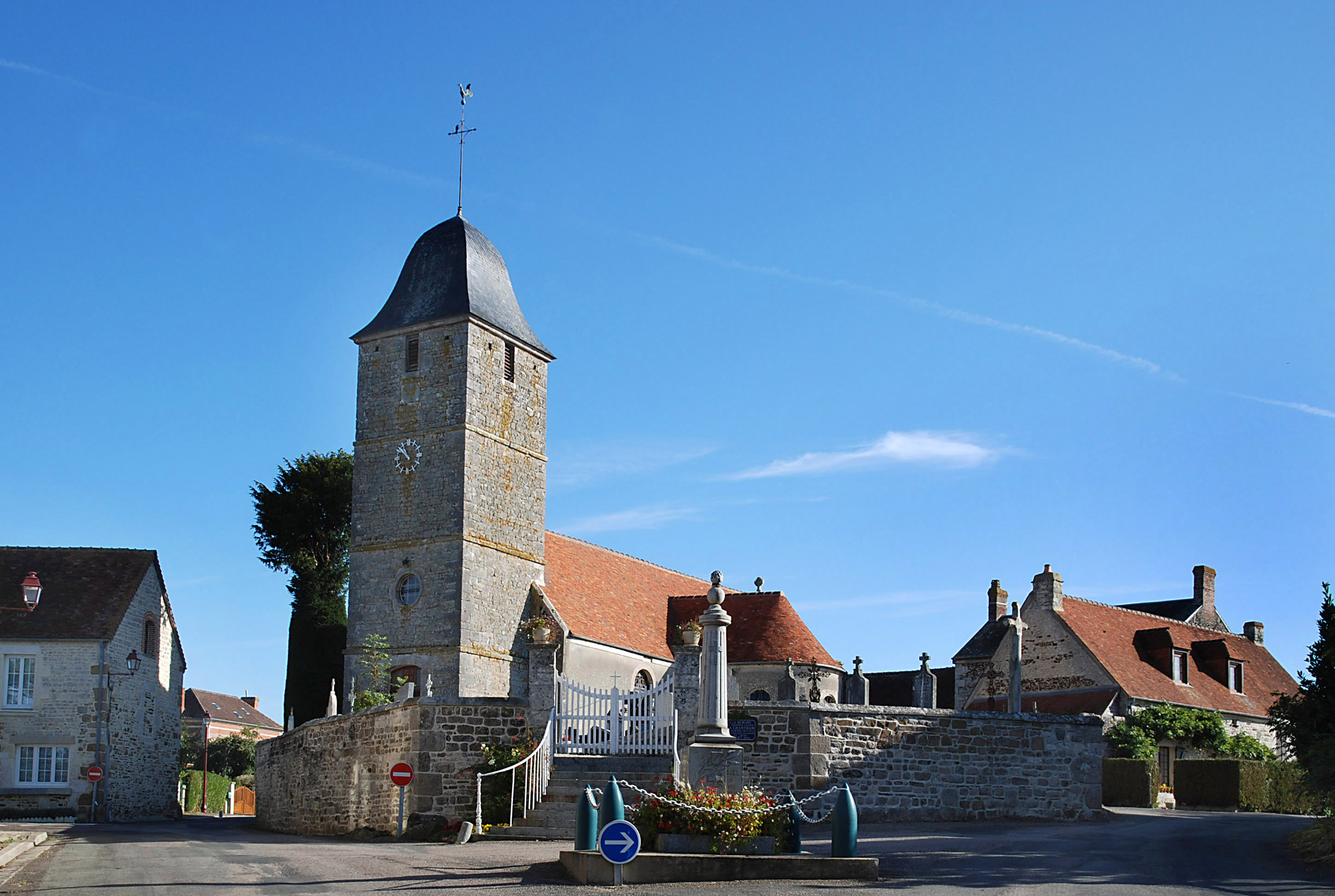
- The church of Saint-Pierre in Giel-Courteilles
- Location of Giel-Courteilles
- Location within France Location within Normandy
- Coordinates: 48°45′55″N 0°11′45″W
- Country: France
- Region: Normandy
- Department: Orne
- Arrondissement: Argentan
- Canton: Athis-Val de Rouvre
- Intercommunality: Val d'Orne

Government
  - Mayor (2020–2026): Michel Petit
- Area^{1}: 12.58 km^{2} (4.86 sq mi)
- Elevation: 245 m (804 ft)
- Highest elevation: 252 m (827 ft)
- Lowest elevation: 124 m (407 ft)
- Population (2023): 488
  - Density: 38.8/km^{2} (100/sq mi)
- Time zone: UTC+01:00 (CET)
  - Summer (DST): UTC+02:00 (CEST)
- INSEE/Postal code: 61189 /61210
- ^{1} French Land Register data, which excludes lakes, ponds, glaciers > 1 km^{2} (0.386 sq mi or 247 acres) and river estuaries.

Giel-Courteilles (French pronunciation: [ʒjɛl kuʁtɛj]) is a commune in the Orne department in north-western France. The current commune was formed in 1965 when the two communes of Giel and Courteilles merged.

== Geography ==
The commune of Giel-Courteilles is part of the area known as Suisse Normande.

The commune is made up of the following collection of villages and hamlets, Giel-Courteilles, Courteilles,Le Jardin, Les Landes and Les Préaux.

Giel-Courteilles along with another 65 communes is part of a 20,593 hectare, Natura 2000 conservation area, called the Haute vallée de l'Orne et affluents. Giel-Courteilles is spread over an area of 12.58 square kilometres (3,110 acres) with a maximum altitude of 252 metres (826 ft 9 in) and minimum of 124 metres (406 ft 10 in)

The river Orne runs through the commune, along with one of its tributaries Ruisseau du Gue Blandin.

=== Land distribution ===
According to the 2018 CORINE Land Cover assessment just over half of the land in the commune, 54% (676 hectares (1,670 acres)) is Meadows. The rest of the land is Arable land at 31%, 13% of land is forests and 77 hectares (190 acres) or 6% is classed as Heterogeneous agricultural land.

== Notable people ==
- Michel Onfray a French writer and philosopher was schooled at the Giel-Don Bosco Catholic school Giel-Courteilles.
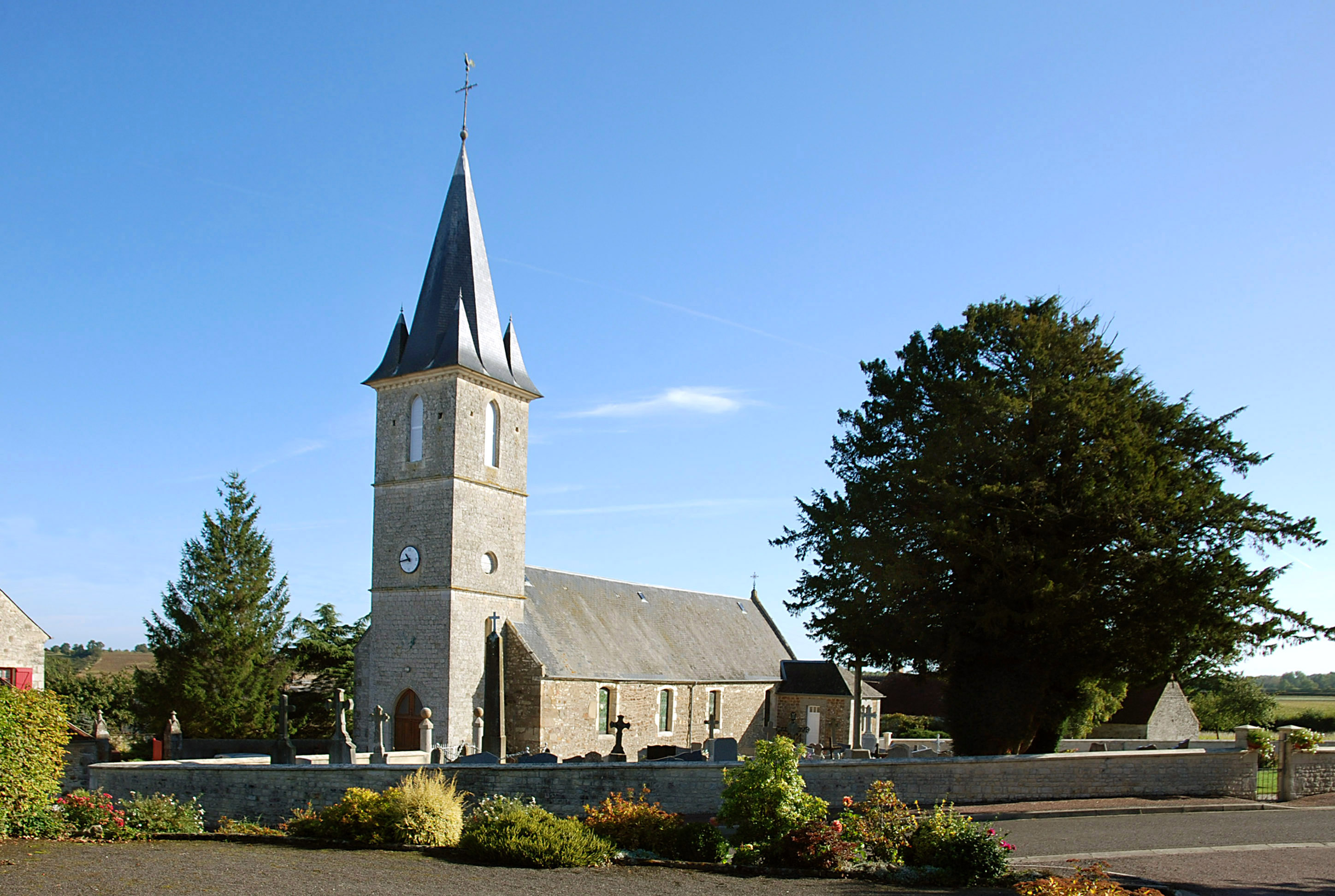
Church of Saint-Roch in Courteilles

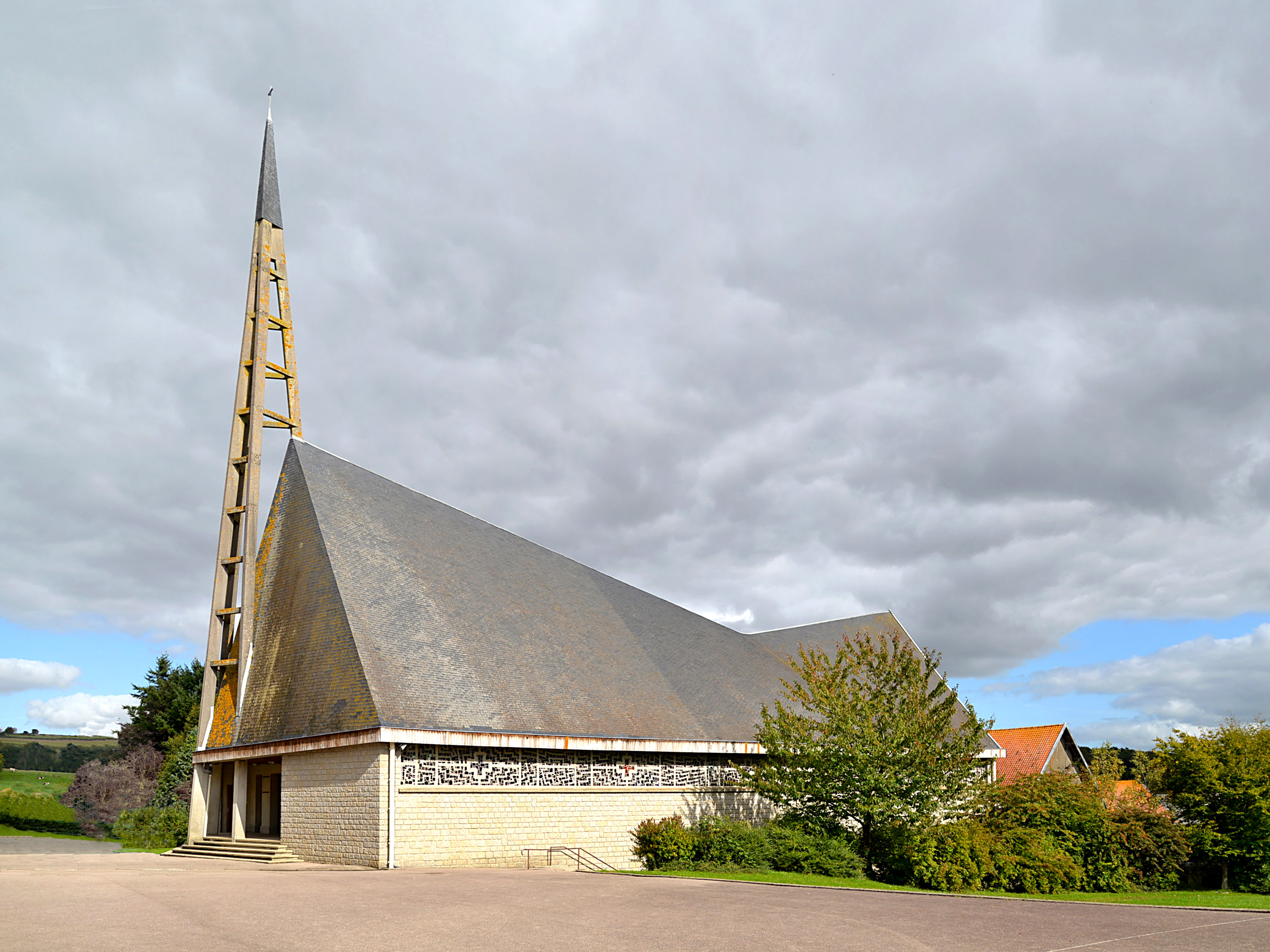
Chapel of the Giel-Don Bosco Agricultural and Professional High School in Giel-Courteilles

== See also ==
- Communes of the Orne department
