= Champcerie =

- Commune
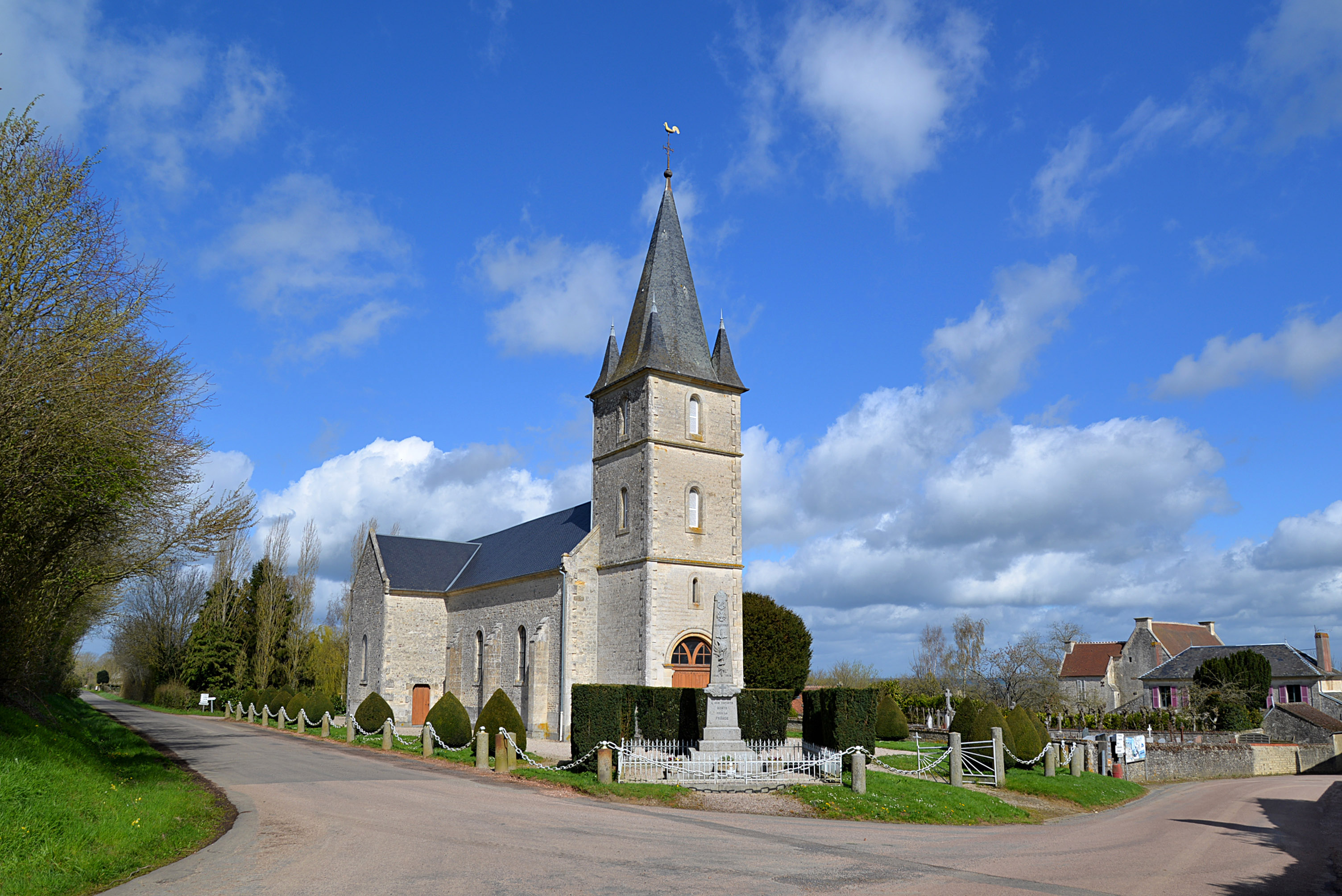
- The church in Champcerie
- Location of Champcerie
- Location within France Location within Normandy
- Coordinates: 48°48′39″N 0°13′26″W
- Country: France
- Region: Normandy
- Department: Orne
- Arrondissement: Argentan
- Canton: Athis-Val de Rouvre
- Intercommunality: Val d'Orne

Government
  - Mayor (2020–2026): Dominique Pichonnier
- Area^{1}: 8.94 km^{2} (3.45 sq mi)
- Highest elevation: 231 m (758 ft)
- Lowest elevation: 159 m (522 ft)
- Population (2023): 177
  - Density: 19.8/km^{2} (51.3/sq mi)
- Time zone: UTC+01:00 (CET)
  - Summer (DST): UTC+02:00 (CEST)
- INSEE/Postal code: 61084 /61210
- ^{1} French Land Register data, which excludes lakes, ponds, glaciers > 1 km^{2} (0.386 sq mi or 247 acres) and river estuaries.

Champcerie (French pronunciation: [ʃɑ̃səʁi]) is a commune in the Orne department in north-western France.

== Geography ==
The commune of Champcerie is part of the area known as Suisse Normande.

The commune is made up of the following collection of villages and hamlets, Champcerie, Fumeçon and La Chardinière. The commune is spread over an area of 44.68 square kilometres (11,040 acres) with a maximum altitude of 313 metres (1,026 ft 11 in) and minimum of 140 metres (459 ft 4 in)

The river Baize runs through the commune, along with two of its tributaries, Ruisseau de la Fontaine Andre and Ruisseau des Vallees.

=== Land distribution ===
According to the 2018 CORINE Land Cover assessment just over half of the land in the commune, 52% (745 hectares (1,840 acres)) is Forest. The rest of the land is Meadows at 28%, 11% of land is classed as Heterogeneous agricultural land, 6% is shrub and/or herbaceous vegetation and 5% is Arable land.

== Notable buildings and places ==
The Commune contains a Renaissance period house has been listed as Monument historique as the main interest lies in the quality and refinement of its interior decor, as very little has been altered since the origin.

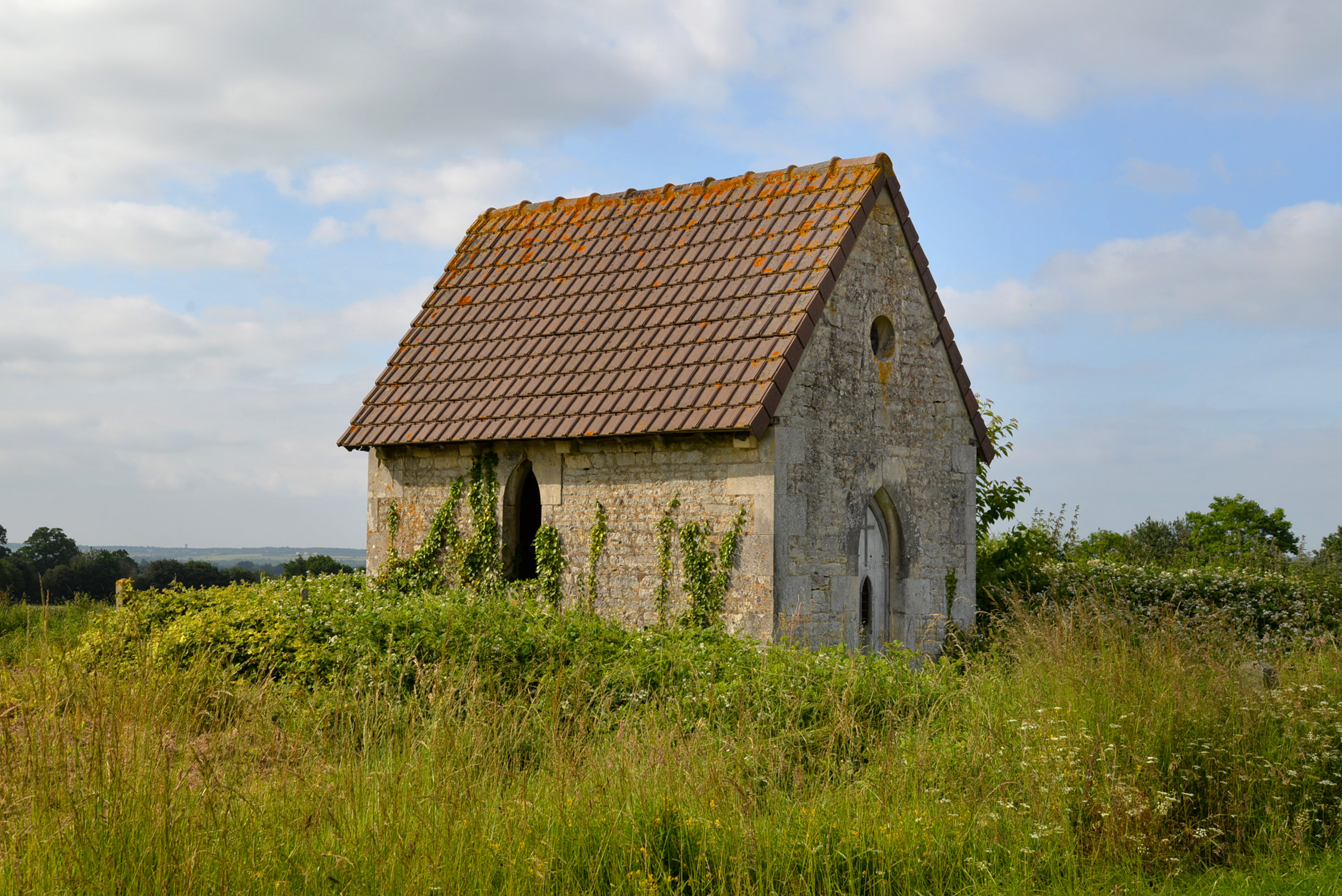
Chapelle of Notre-Dame-des-Victoires in Champcerie

== See also ==
- Communes of the Orne department
