= Craménil =

- Commune
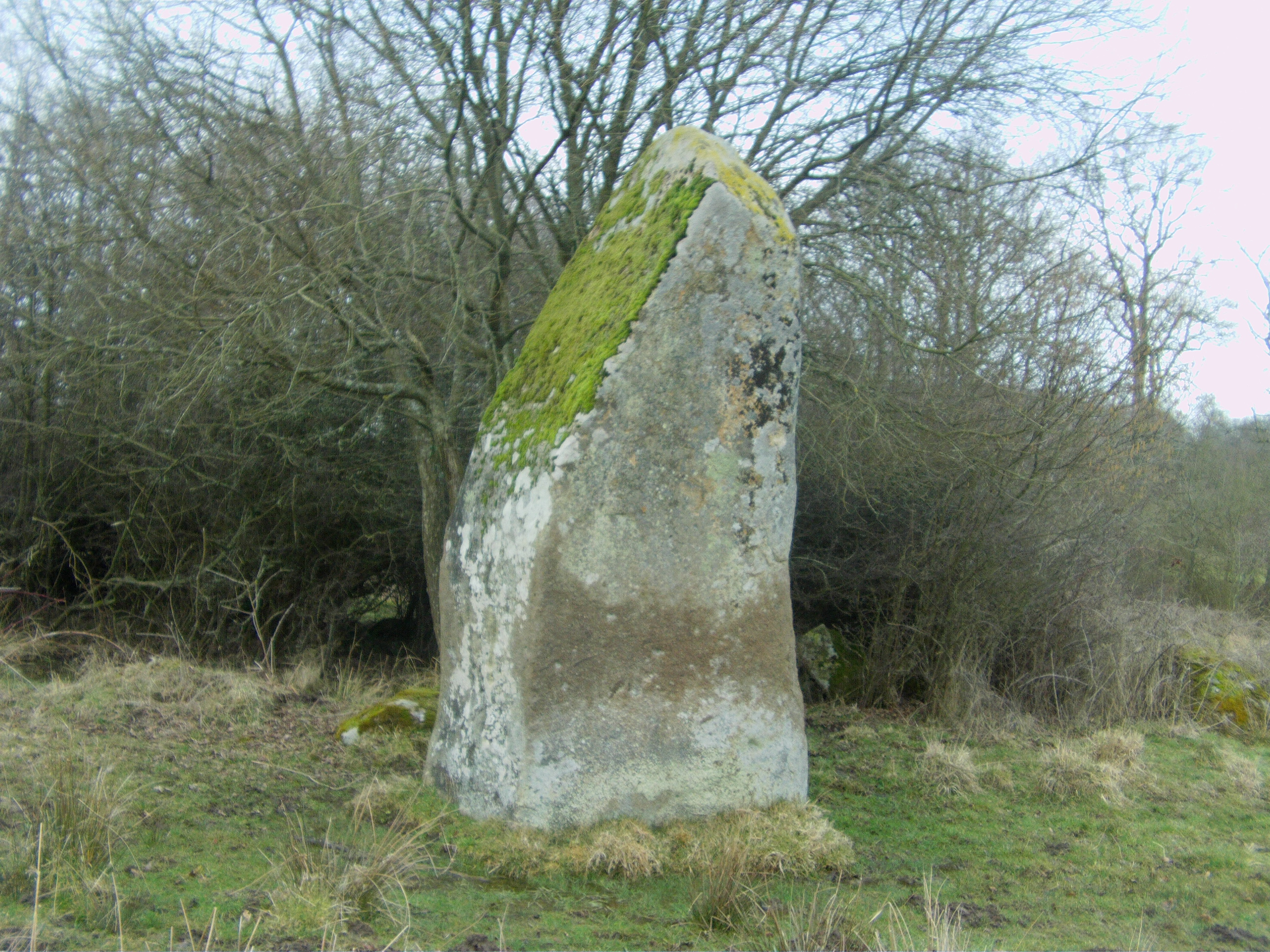
- A menhir in Craménil
- Location of Craménil
- Location within France Location within Normandy
- Coordinates: 48°44′42″N 0°22′37″W
- Country: France
- Region: Normandy
- Department: Orne
- Arrondissement: Argentan
- Canton: Athis-Val de Rouvre
- Intercommunality: Val d'Orne

Government
  - Mayor (2020–2026): Jean Onfroy
- Area^{1}: 8.09 km^{2} (3.12 sq mi)
- Highest elevation: 253 m (830 ft)
- Lowest elevation: 174 m (571 ft)
- Population (2023): 131
  - Density: 16.2/km^{2} (41.9/sq mi)
- Demonym: Craménilois
- Time zone: UTC+01:00 (CET)
  - Summer (DST): UTC+02:00 (CEST)
- INSEE/Postal code: 61137 /61220
- ^{1} French Land Register data, which excludes lakes, ponds, glaciers > 1 km^{2} (0.386 sq mi or 247 acres) and river estuaries.

Craménil (French pronunciation: [kʁamenil]) is a commune in the Orne department in north-western France.

== Geography ==
The commune is made up of the following collection of villages and hamlets, Le Bois, Chênesec,La Morinière and Craménil.

The commune is part of the area known as Suisse Normande.

There are four watercourses that run through the commune, the River Rouvre and three streams the Maufy, Le Bel Argent and the Haie.

== Notable buildings and places ==
=== National heritage sites ===
The Commune has 2 buildings and areas listed as a Monument historique

- Four Bridges of the Rouvre a collection of 16-17th Century Toll Bridges, known as the Motte bridge, the Chênesecq bridge, the Neuf bridge and the Raulette bridge. The bridges are the last evidence of 16-17th Century toll bridges and were used up to the end of the 19th Century, beginning of the 20th Century, when the mills they served closed down. They were registered as a Monument historique in 1993.
- The sharpener of Gargantua Menhir a Neolithic Menhir registered as a Monument historique in 1889.

== See also ==
- Communes of the Orne department
