= Faverolles, Orne =

Faverolles
- Commune
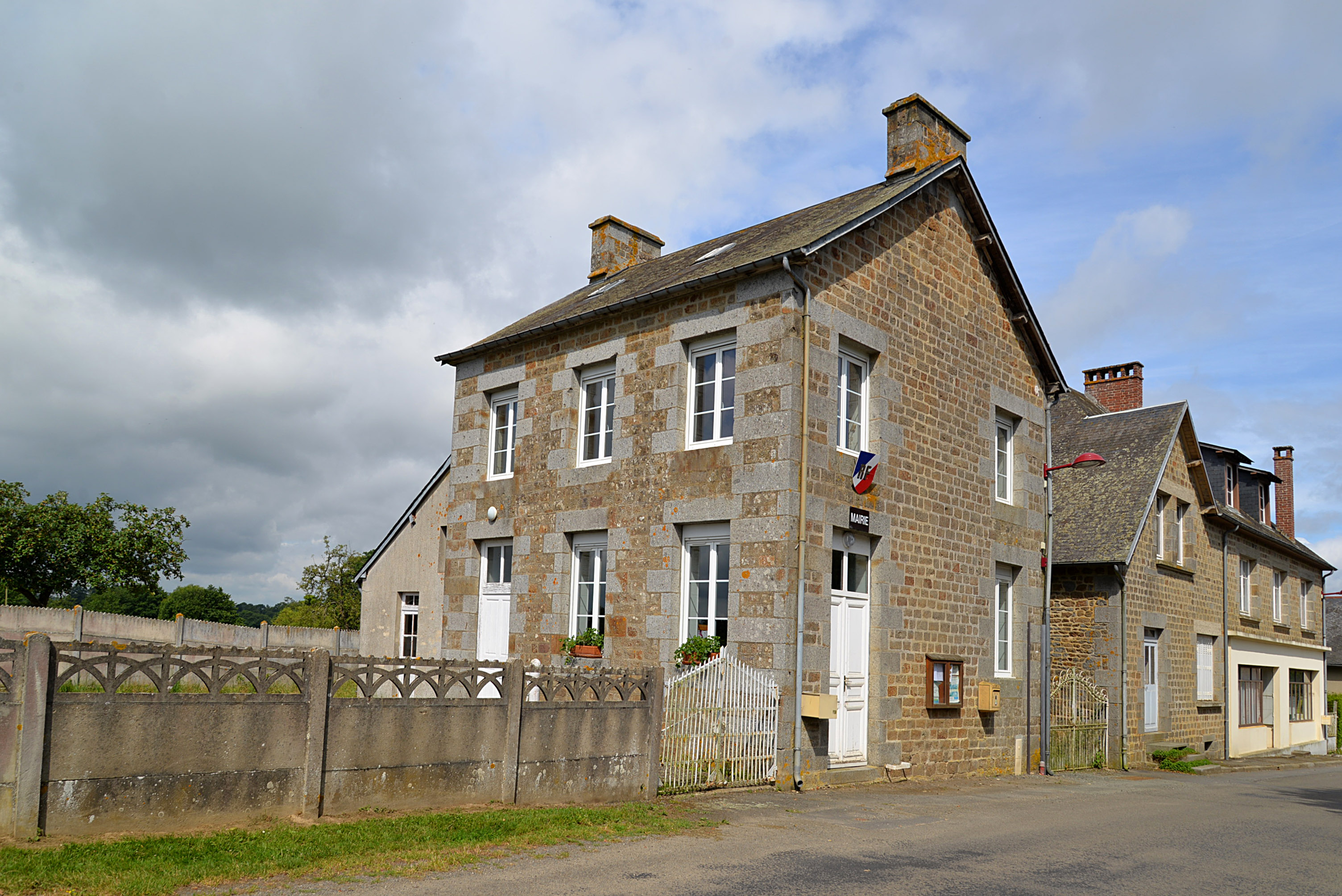
- The town hall in Faverolles
- Location of Faverolles
- Location within France Location within Normandy
- Coordinates: 48°40′07″N 0°17′47″W
- Country: France
- Region: Normandy
- Department: Orne
- Arrondissement: Argentan
- Canton: Athis-Val de Rouvre
- Intercommunality: Val d'Orne

Government
  - Mayor (2020–2026): Annette Martin
- Area^{1}: 10.57 km^{2} (4.08 sq mi)
- Elevation: 209 m (686 ft)
- Highest elevation: 267 m (876 ft)
- Lowest elevation: 206 m (676 ft)
- Population (2023): 130
  - Density: 12/km^{2} (32/sq mi)
- Time zone: UTC+01:00 (CET)
  - Summer (DST): UTC+02:00 (CEST)
- INSEE/Postal code: 61158 /61600
- ^{1} French Land Register data, which excludes lakes, ponds, glaciers > 1 km^{2} (0.386 sq mi or 247 acres) and river estuaries.

Faverolles (French pronunciation: [favʁɔl]) is a commune in the Orne department in north-western France.

== Geography ==
The commune is made up of the following collection of villages and hamlets, La Fromagère, Essay, La Chênellière, Le Gué de Rouvre, La Corderie, La Chappronnière, La Hourdouillère, Trousse-Gerbe, and Faverolles.

Faverolles along with another 65 communes is part of a 20,593 hectare, Natura 2000 conservation area, called the Haute vallée de l'Orne et affluents.

There are seven watercourses that run through the commune, 3 rivers Rouvre, Maire and the Rouvrette. The other watercourses are 4 streams, the Fief Benoit, Gué d'Arnettes, Moulinet & Besier.

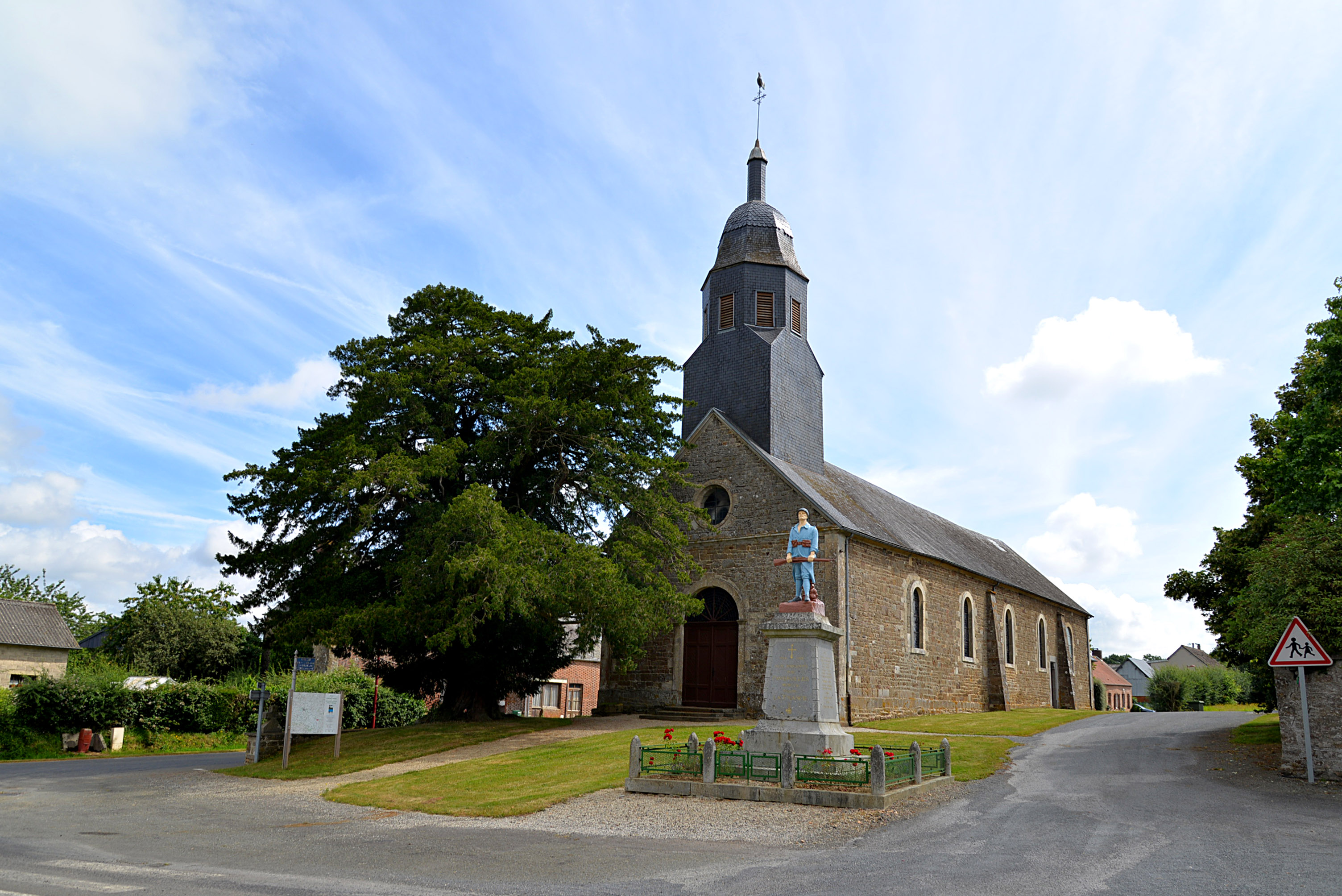
Church of Saint-Pierre and war memorial

== See also ==
- Communes of the Orne department
