= Saint-Hilaire-de-Briouze =

- Commune
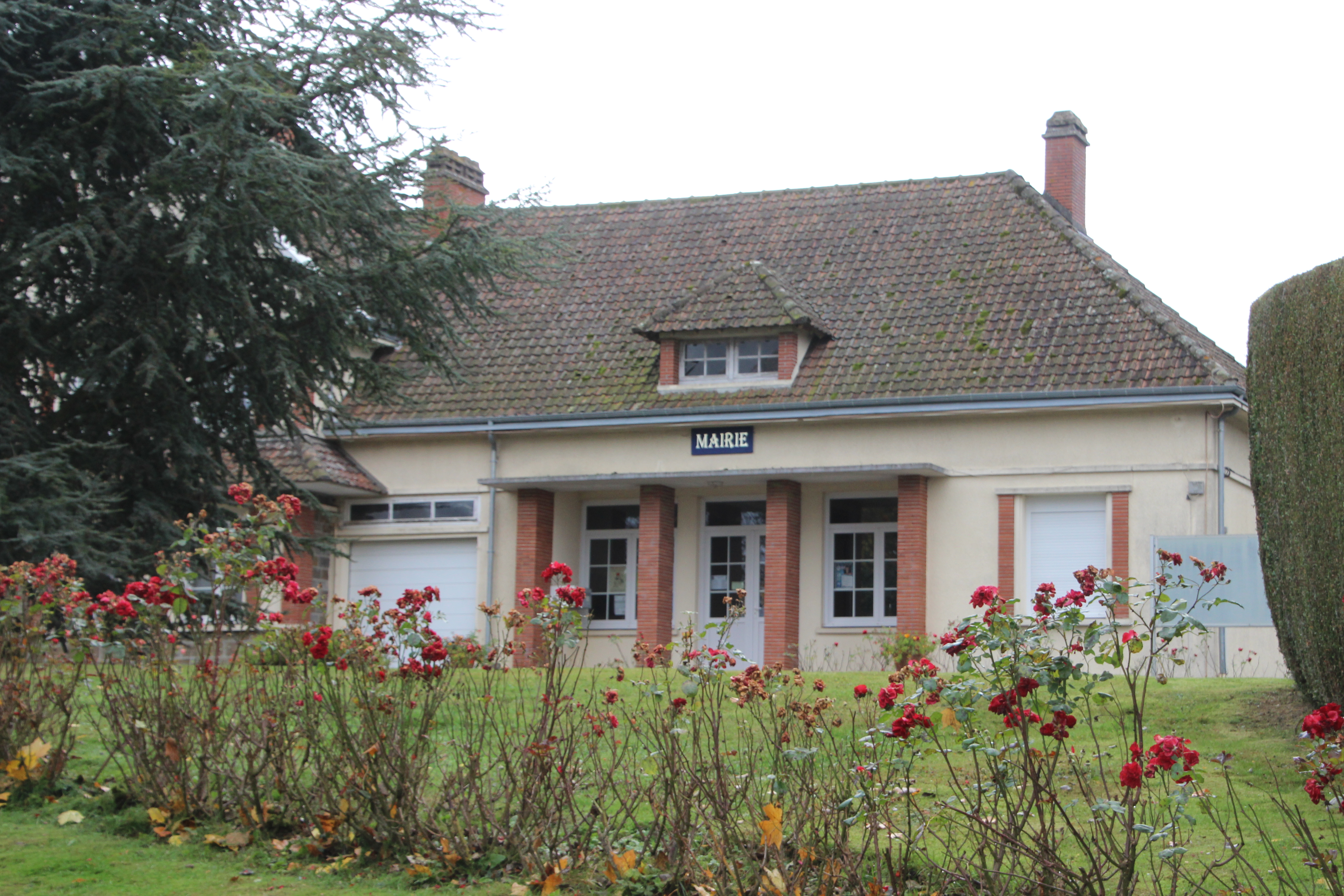
- The town hall in Saint-Hilaire-de-Briouze
- Location of Saint-Hilaire-de-Briouze
- Location within France Location within Normandy
- Coordinates: 48°42′24″N 0°19′23″W
- Country: France
- Region: Normandy
- Department: Orne
- Arrondissement: Argentan
- Canton: Athis-Val de Rouvre
- Intercommunality: Val d'Orne

Government
  - Mayor (2020–2026): Christine Pommier
- Area^{1}: 13.63 km^{2} (5.26 sq mi)
- Elevation: 221 m (725 ft)
- Highest elevation: 270 m (890 ft)
- Lowest elevation: 201 m (659 ft)
- Population (2023): 292
  - Density: 21.4/km^{2} (55.5/sq mi)
- Time zone: UTC+01:00 (CET)
  - Summer (DST): UTC+02:00 (CEST)
- INSEE/Postal code: 61402 /61220
- ^{1} French Land Register data, which excludes lakes, ponds, glaciers > 1 km^{2} (0.386 sq mi or 247 acres) and river estuaries.

Saint-Hilaire-de-Briouze (French pronunciation: [sɛ̃t‿ilɛʁ də bʁijuz], literally Saint-Hilaire of Briouze) is a commune in the Orne department in north-western France.

== Geography ==
The commune is made up of the following collection of villages and hamlets, Le Valdary, Les Auges,Les Mézerets, La Huverie, La Grande Bêche and Saint-Hilaire-de-Briouze.

The commune borders the area known as Suisse Normande.

Saint-Hilaire-de-Briouze along with another 65 communes is part of a 20,593 hectare, Natura 2000 conservation area, called the Haute vallée de l'Orne et affluents.

There are 4 watercourses that run through the commune, The river Rouvre plus 3 streams, Fief Benoit, Gué d'Arnettes, and the Vaux.

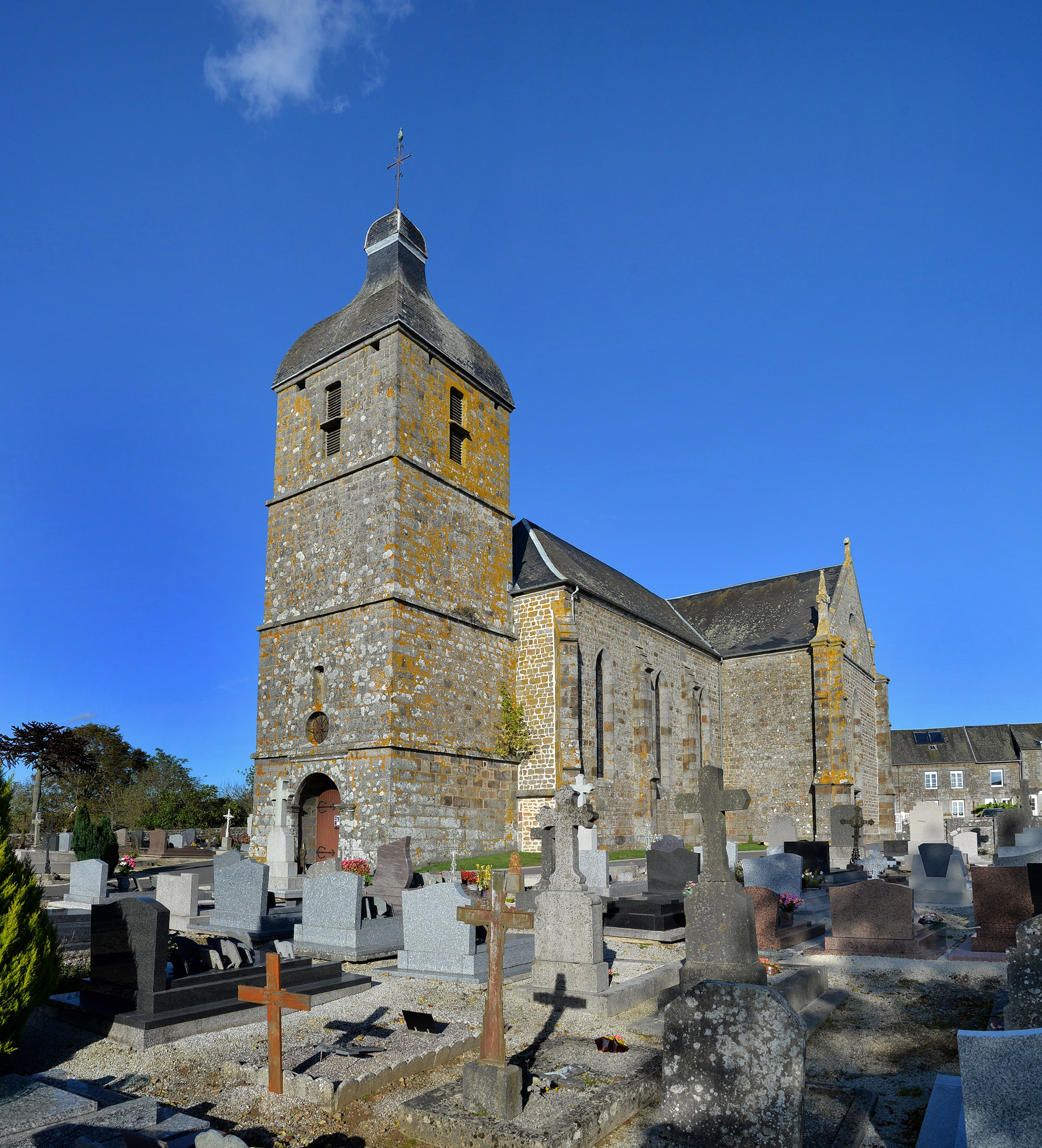
Church of Saint-Hilaire

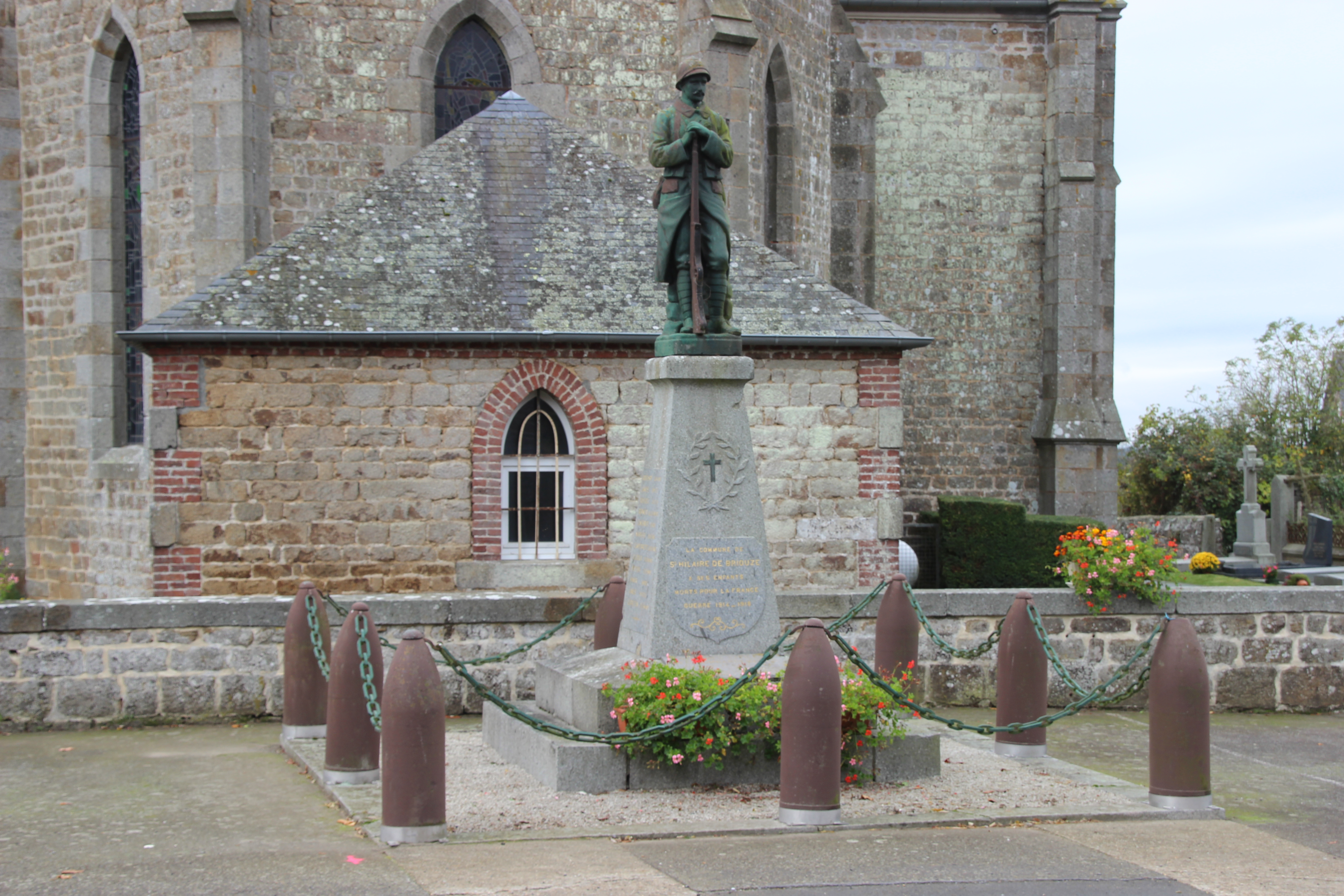
war memorial of Saint-Hilaire-de-Briouze

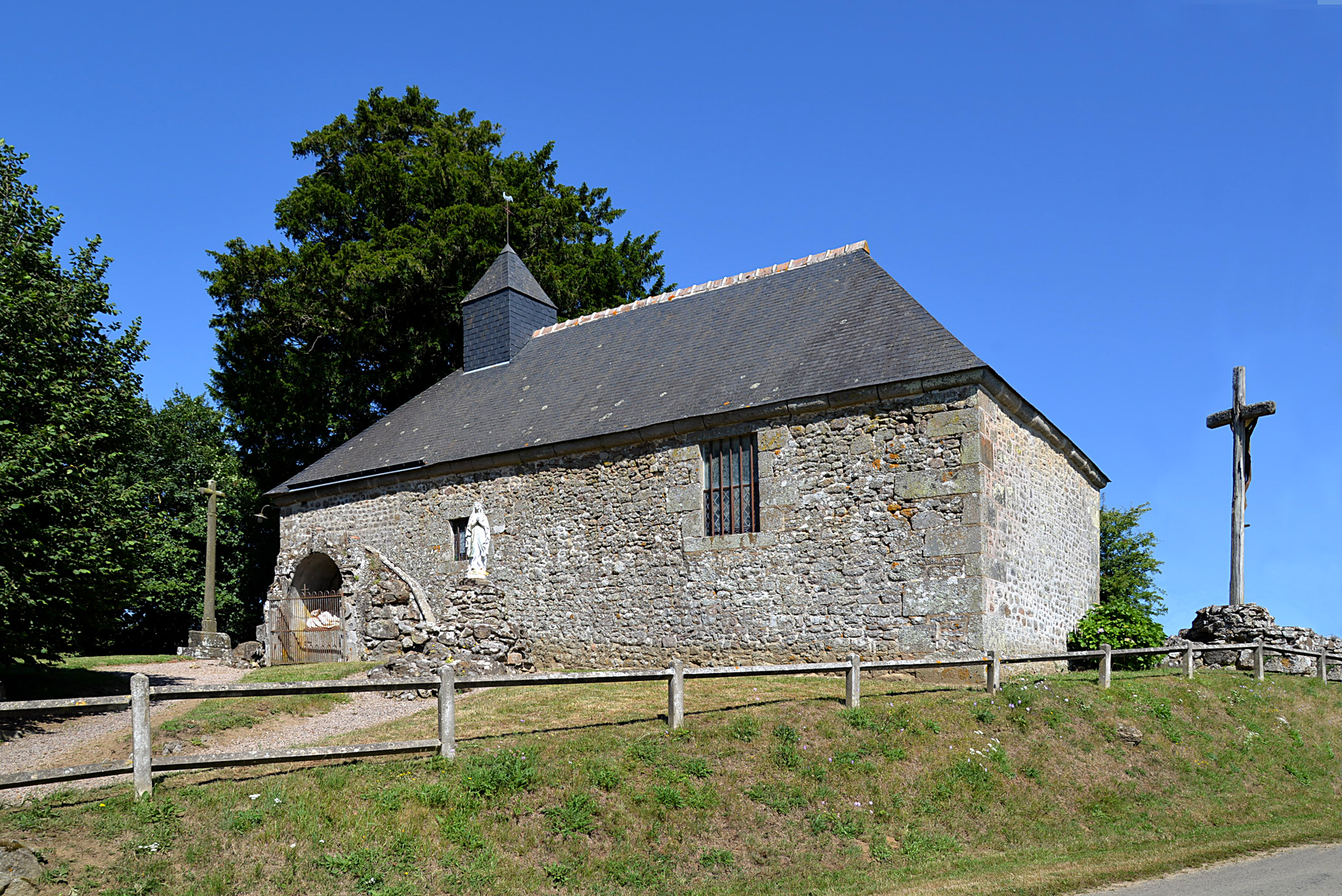
Chapelle of Saint-Hermeland de Montreuil-au-Houlme

== See also ==
- Communes of the Orne department
