= Lignou =

- Commune
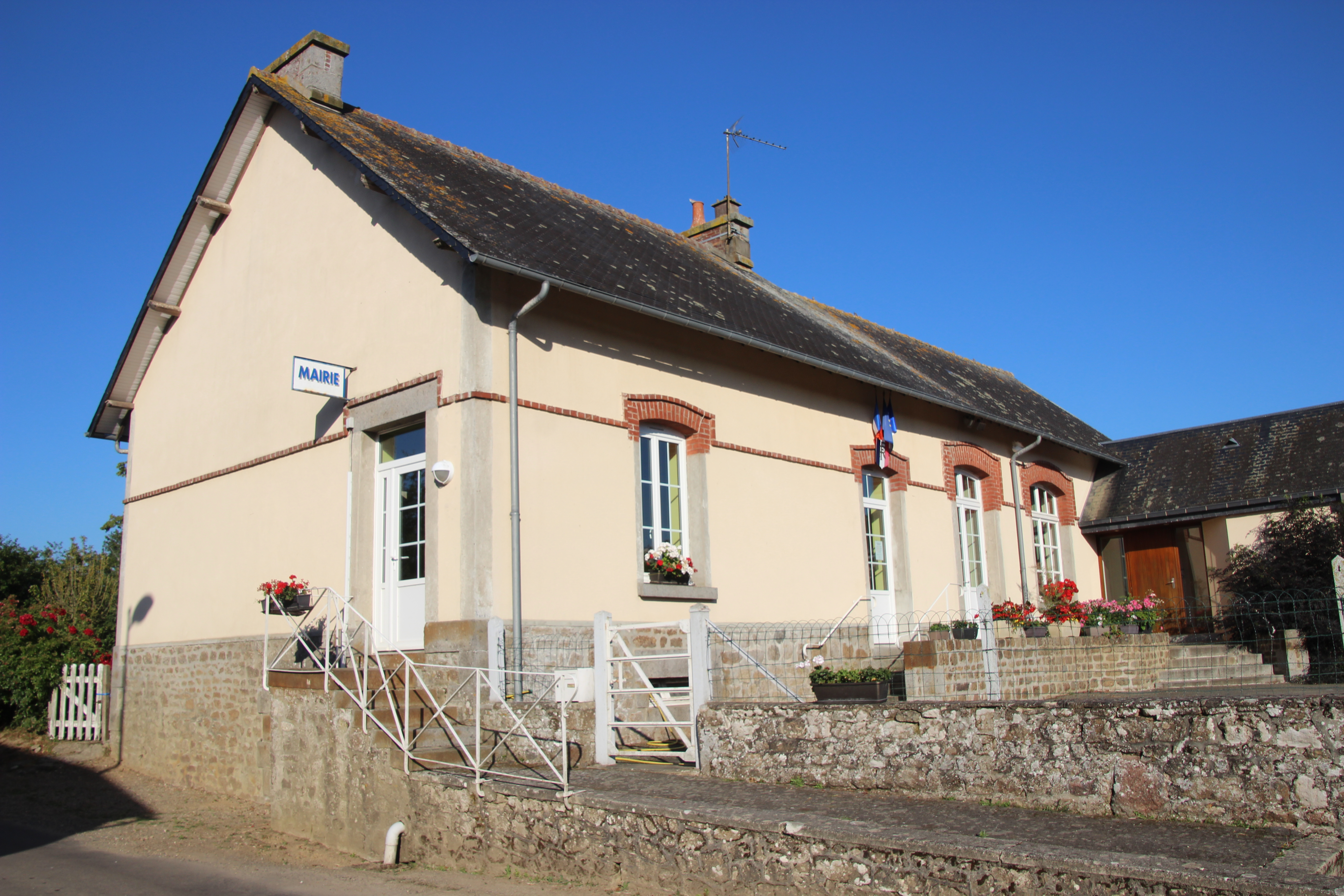
- The town hall in Lignou
- Location of Lignou
- Location within France Location within Normandy
- Coordinates: 48°40′17″N 0°20′41″W
- Country: France
- Region: Normandy
- Department: Orne
- Arrondissement: Argentan
- Canton: Athis-Val de Rouvre
- Intercommunality: Val d'Orne

Government
  - Mayor (2020–2026): Jean-Claude Bignon
- Area^{1}: 7.61 km^{2} (2.94 sq mi)
- Elevation: 238 m (781 ft)
- Highest elevation: 254 m (833 ft)
- Lowest elevation: 202 m (663 ft)
- Population (2023): 136
  - Density: 17.9/km^{2} (46.3/sq mi)
- Time zone: UTC+01:00 (CET)
  - Summer (DST): UTC+02:00 (CEST)
- INSEE/Postal code: 61227 /61220
- ^{1} French Land Register data, which excludes lakes, ponds, glaciers > 1 km^{2} (0.386 sq mi or 247 acres) and river estuaries.

Lignou (French pronunciation: [liɲu]) is a commune in the Orne department in north-western France.

== Geography ==
The commune is made up of the following collection of villages and hamlets, Le Bisson, L'Abbaye and Lignou.

The commune has one river running through it, The Rouvre and two streams the Fief Benoit & the Arthan.

== Notable buildings and places ==
=== National heritage sites ===
- Château de Lignou a 16th Century Chateau in Lignou registered as a Monument historique in 1973.
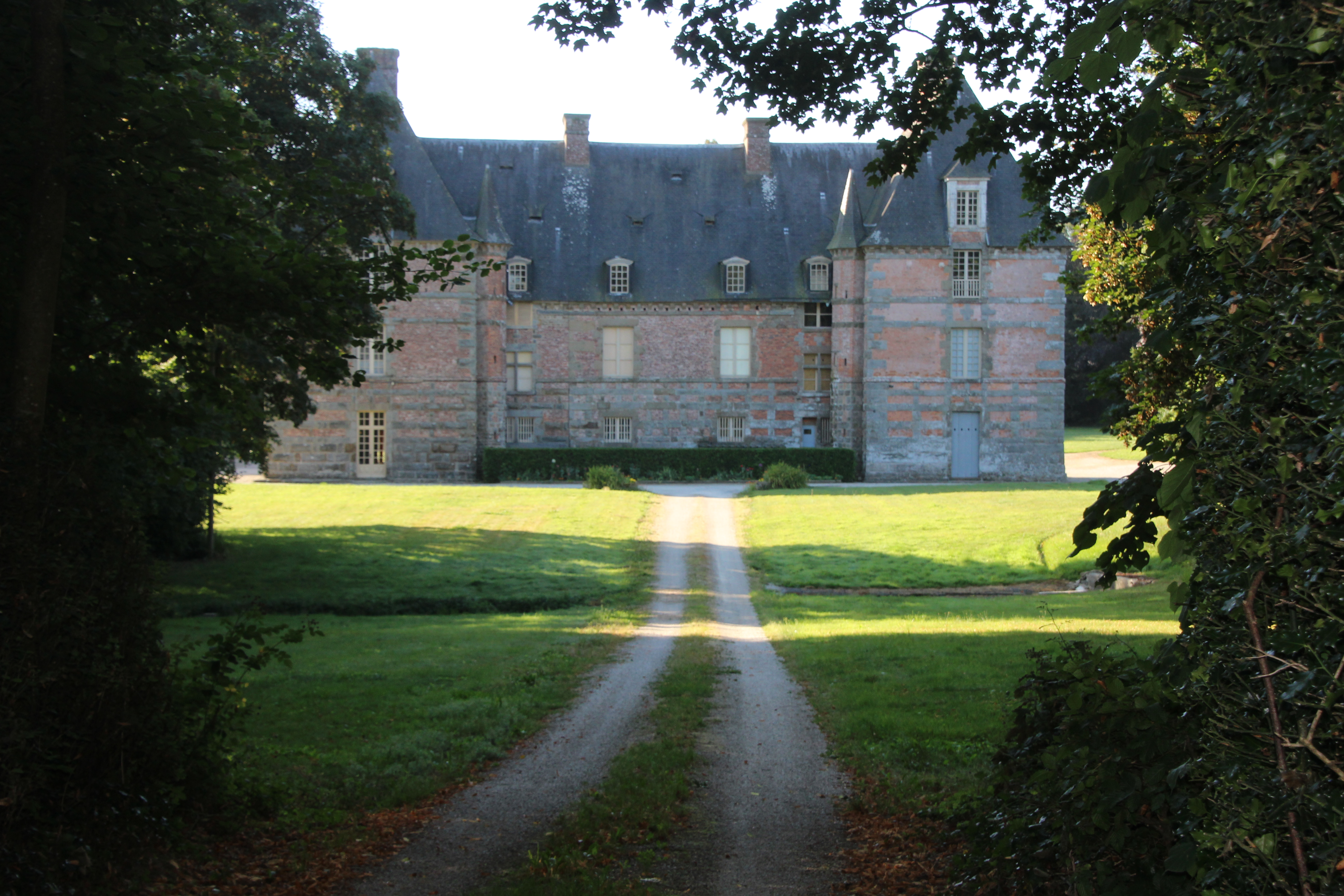
Château de Lignou

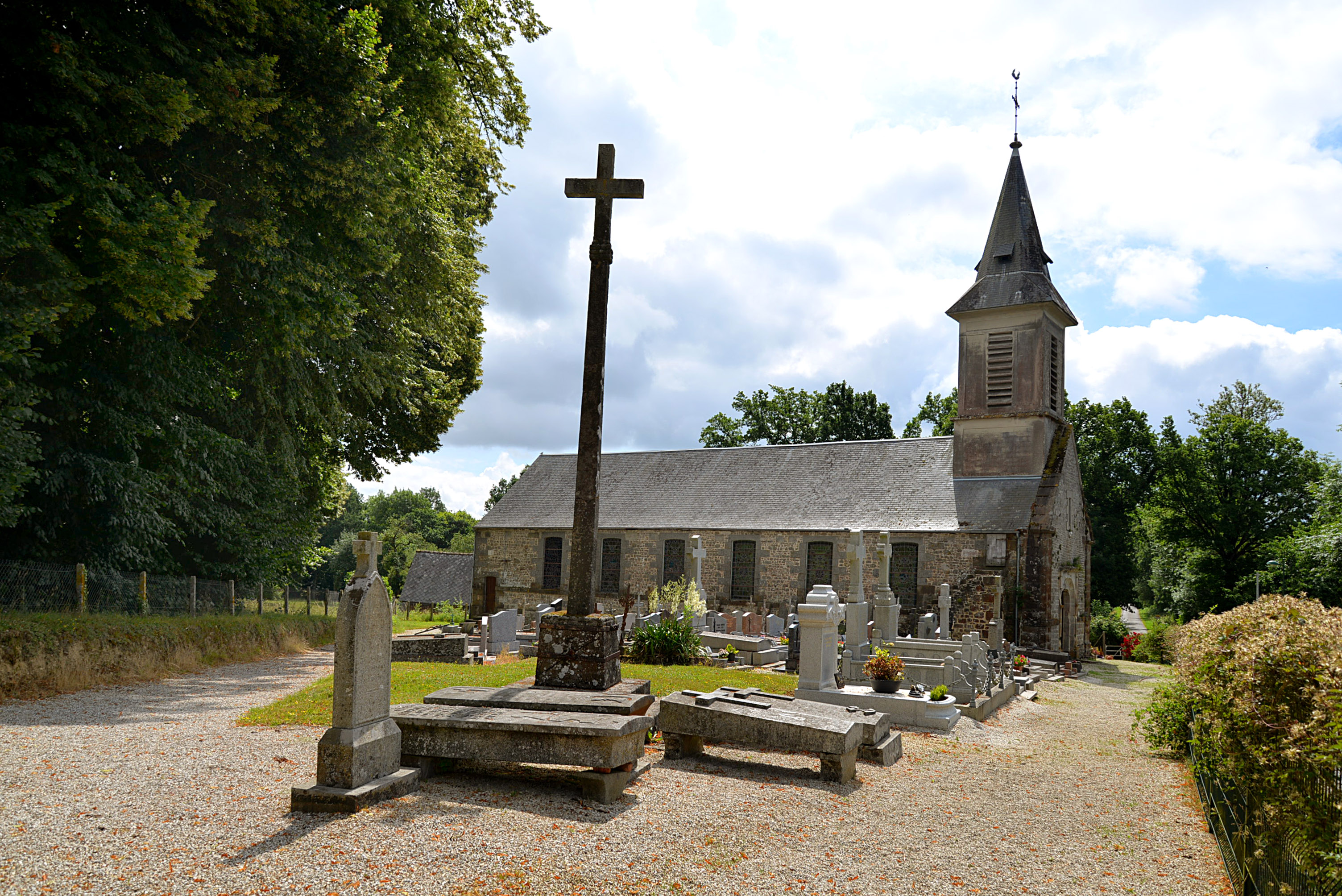
Church of Saint-Martin in Lignou.

== Population ==
Historical population
Year	Pop.	±% p.a.
1968	243	—
1975	196	−3.02%
1982	180	−1.21%
1990	153	−2.01%
1999	148	−0.37%
2007	137	−0.96%
2012	135	−0.29%
2017	150	+2.13%
2023	136	−1.62%
Source: INSEE

== See also ==
- Communes of the Orne department
