= Montreuil-au-Houlme =

- Commune
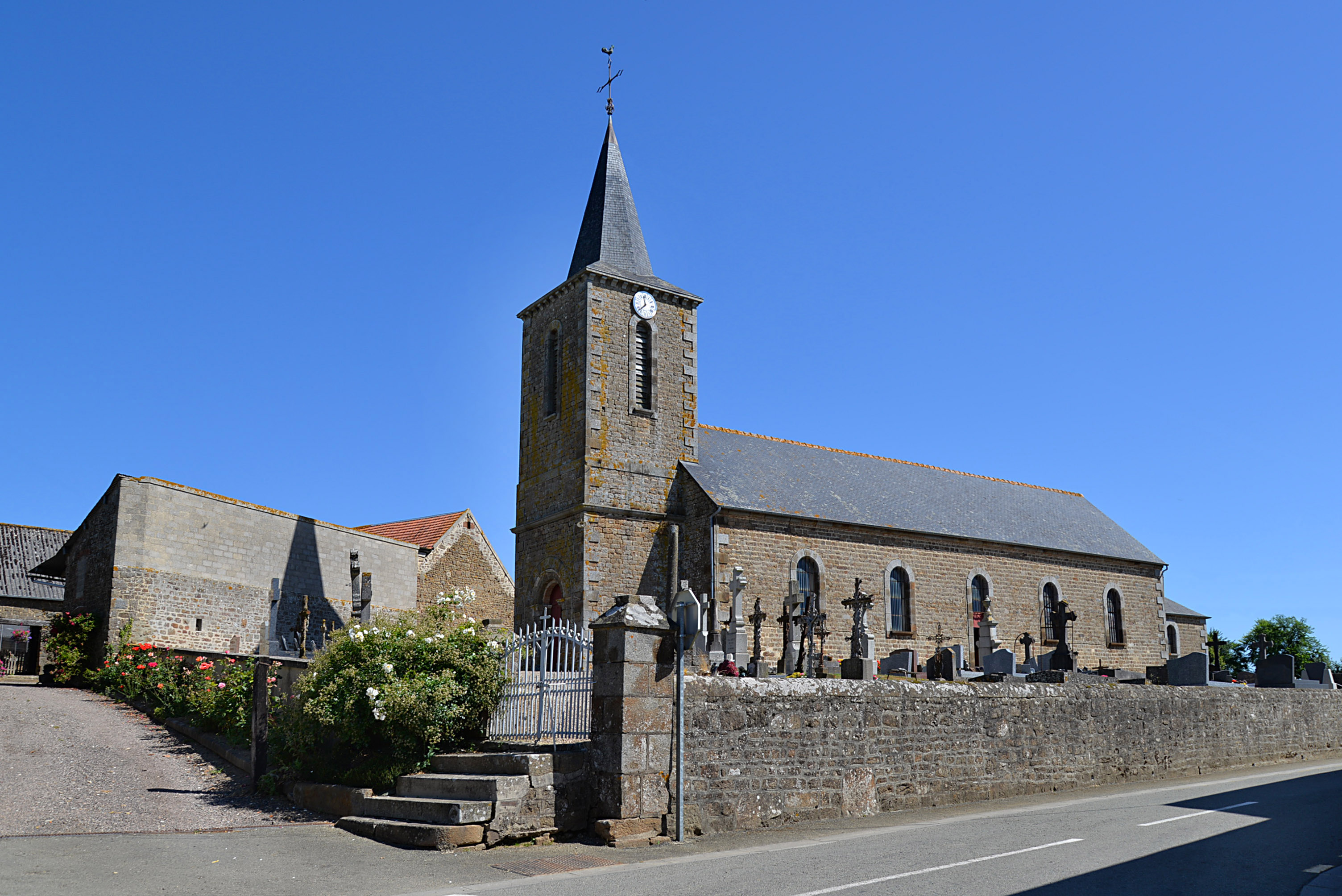
- The church in Montreuil-au-Houlme
- Location of Montreuil-au-Houlme
- Location within France Location within Normandy
- Coordinates: 48°41′14″N 0°15′43″W
- Country: France
- Region: Normandy
- Department: Orne
- Arrondissement: Argentan
- Canton: Athis-Val de Rouvre
- Intercommunality: Val d'Orne

Government
  - Mayor (2020–2026): Marie-Françoise Frouel
- Area^{1}: 7.82 km^{2} (3.02 sq mi)
- Elevation: 242 m (794 ft)
- Highest elevation: 262 m (860 ft)
- Lowest elevation: 184 m (604 ft)
- Population (2023): 125
  - Density: 16.0/km^{2} (41.4/sq mi)
- Time zone: UTC+01:00 (CET)
  - Summer (DST): UTC+02:00 (CEST)
- INSEE/Postal code: 61290 /61210
- ^{1} French Land Register data, which excludes lakes, ponds, glaciers > 1 km^{2} (0.386 sq mi or 247 acres) and river estuaries.

Montreuil-au-Houlme (French pronunciation: [mɔ̃tʁœj o ulm]) is a commune in the Orne department in north-western France.

== Geography ==
The commune is made up of the following collection of villages and hamlets, La Crestinière and Montreuil-au-Houlme.

Montreuil-au-Houlme along with another 65 communes is part of a 20,593 hectare, Natura 2000 conservation area, called the Haute vallée de l'Orne et affluents.

The commune has one river running through it, The Maire and 2 streams, the Noeve & the Gué d'Arnettes.

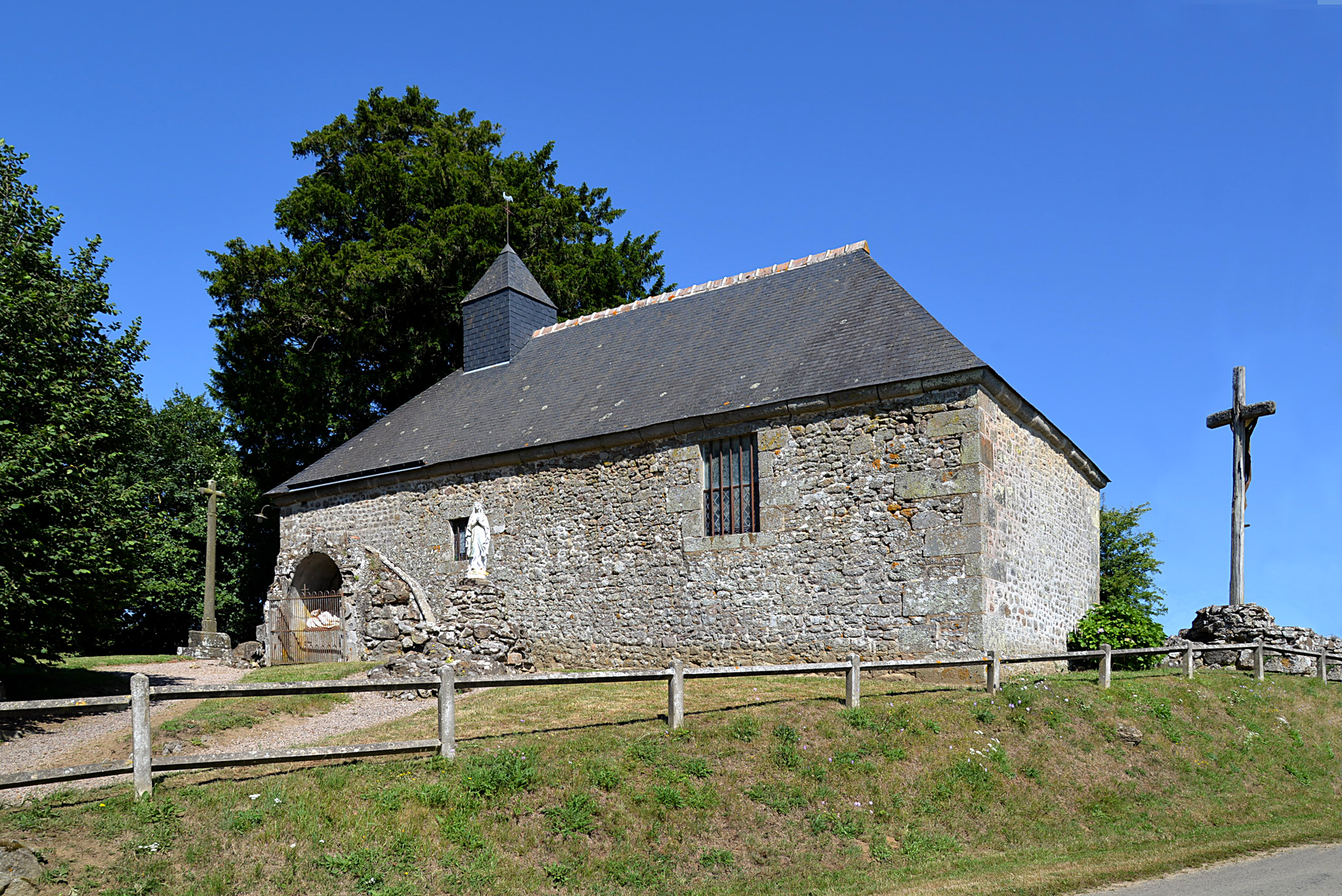
Chapelle of Saint-Hermeland

== See also ==
- Communes of the Orne department
