= Ménil-Vin =

- Commune
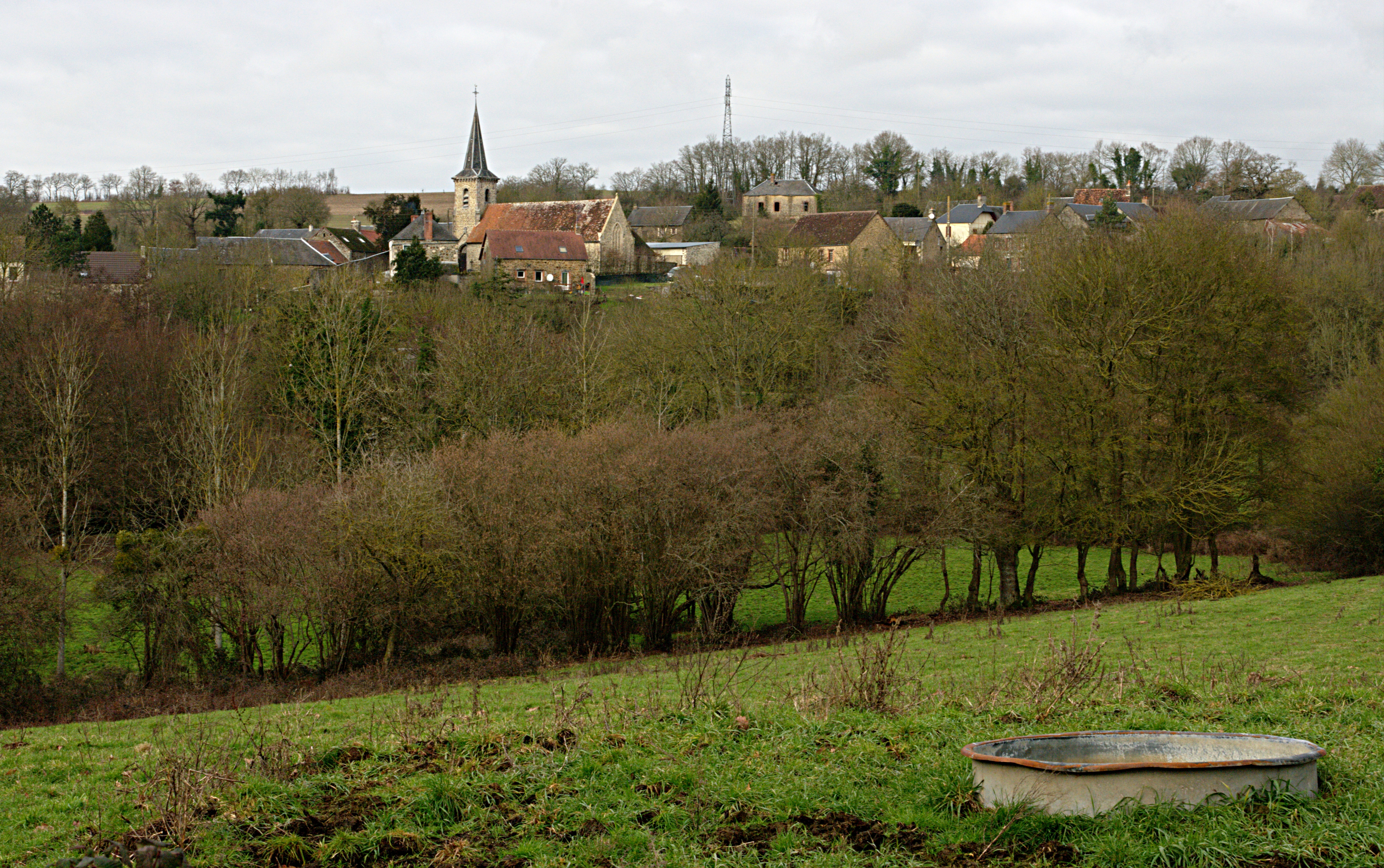
- A general view of Ménil-Vin
- Location of Ménil-Vin
- Location within France Location within Normandy
- Coordinates: 48°50′41″N 0°18′55″W
- Country: France
- Region: Normandy
- Department: Orne
- Arrondissement: Argentan
- Canton: Athis-Val de Rouvre
- Intercommunality: Val d'Orne

Government
  - Mayor (2020–2026): Régis Duchesne
- Area^{1}: 3.62 km^{2} (1.40 sq mi)
- Elevation: 117 m (384 ft)
- Highest elevation: 192 m (630 ft)
- Lowest elevation: 72 m (236 ft)
- Population (2023): 51
  - Density: 14/km^{2} (36/sq mi)
- Time zone: UTC+01:00 (CET)
  - Summer (DST): UTC+02:00 (CEST)
- INSEE/Postal code: 61273 /61210
- ^{1} French Land Register data, which excludes lakes, ponds, glaciers > 1 km^{2} (0.386 sq mi or 247 acres) and river estuaries.

Ménil-Vin (French pronunciation: [menil vɛ̃]) is a commune in the Orne department in north-western France.

== Geography ==
The commune of Ménil-Vin is part of the area known as Suisse Normande.

The river Baize runs through the commune, along with one of its tributaries, Ruisseau du Val Lienard.

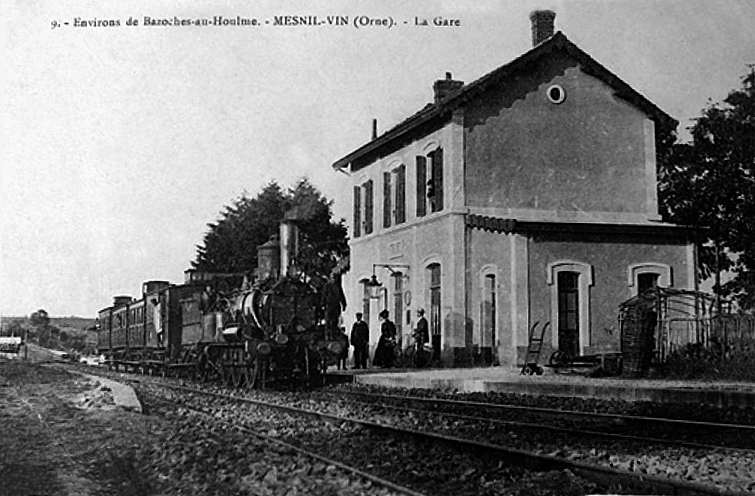
The old Railway station of Ménil-Vin

== See also ==
- Communes of the Orne department
