= Saint-André-de-Briouze =

- Commune
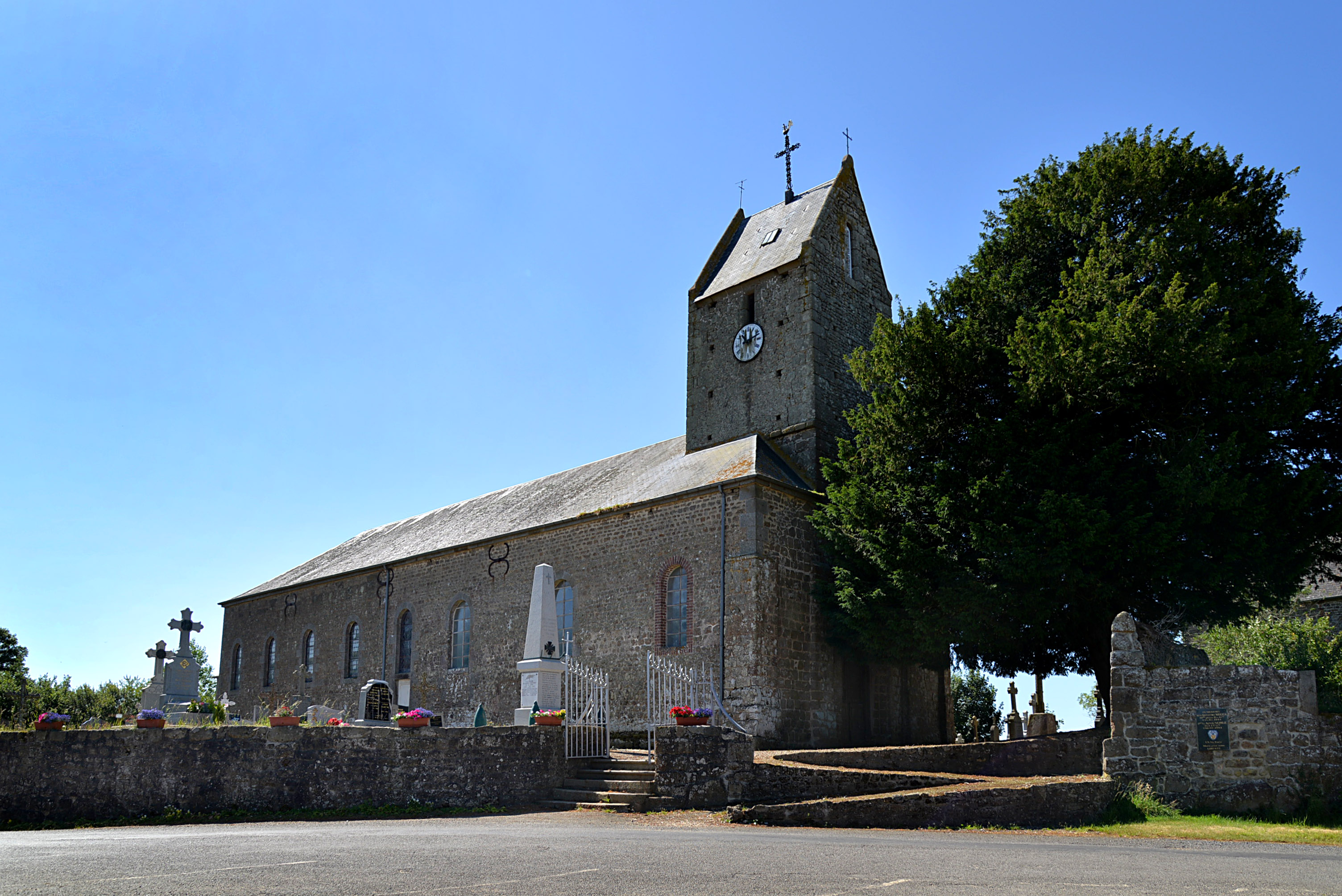
- The church in Saint-André-de-Briouze
- Location of Saint-André-de-Briouze
- Location within France Location within Normandy
- Coordinates: 48°43′50″N 0°19′37″W
- Country: France
- Region: Normandy
- Department: Orne
- Arrondissement: Argentan
- Canton: Athis-Val de Rouvre
- Intercommunality: Val d'Orne

Government
  - Mayor (2020–2026): Lucien Buat
- Area^{1}: 12.21 km^{2} (4.71 sq mi)
- Elevation: 263 m (863 ft)
- Highest elevation: 262 m (860 ft)
- Lowest elevation: 198 m (650 ft)
- Population (2023): 178
  - Density: 14.6/km^{2} (37.8/sq mi)
- Time zone: UTC+01:00 (CET)
  - Summer (DST): UTC+02:00 (CEST)
- INSEE/Postal code: 61361 /61220
- ^{1} French Land Register data, which excludes lakes, ponds, glaciers > 1 km^{2} (0.386 sq mi or 247 acres) and river estuaries.

Saint-André-de-Briouze (French pronunciation: [sɛ̃.t‿ɑ̃dʁe də bʁijuz], literally Saint-André of Briouze) is a commune in the Orne department in north-western France.

== Geography ==
The commune is made up of the following collection of villages and hamlets, Saint-Denis, Les Rivières,Le Haut Bois, St-Andre-de-Briouze and La Foirie.

The commune is part of the area known as Suisse Normande.

The commune has five watercourses running through it, two Rivers Rouvre & Le Val du Breuil, and three streams Le Bel Argent, the Vaux & the Maufy.

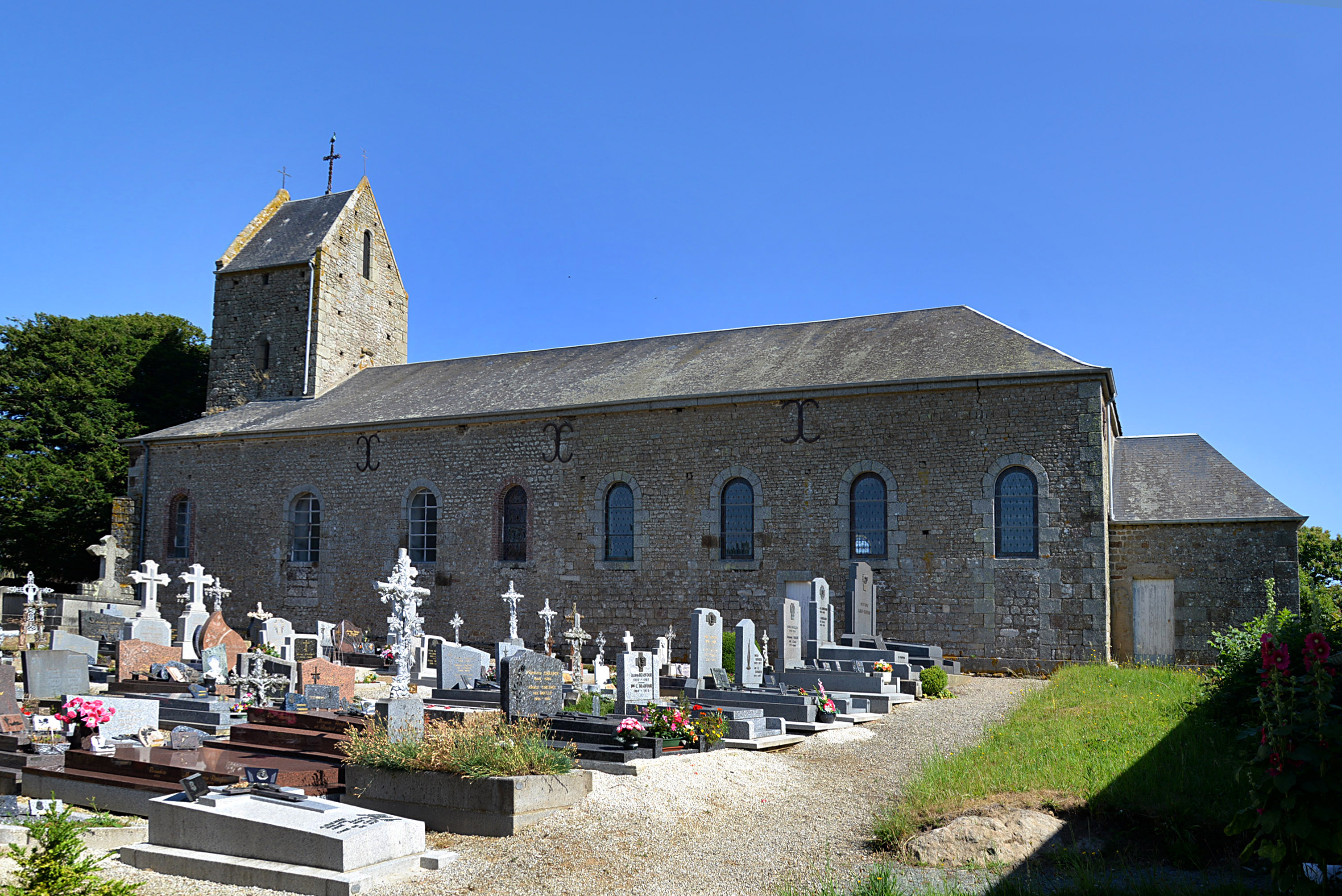
Church of Saint-André

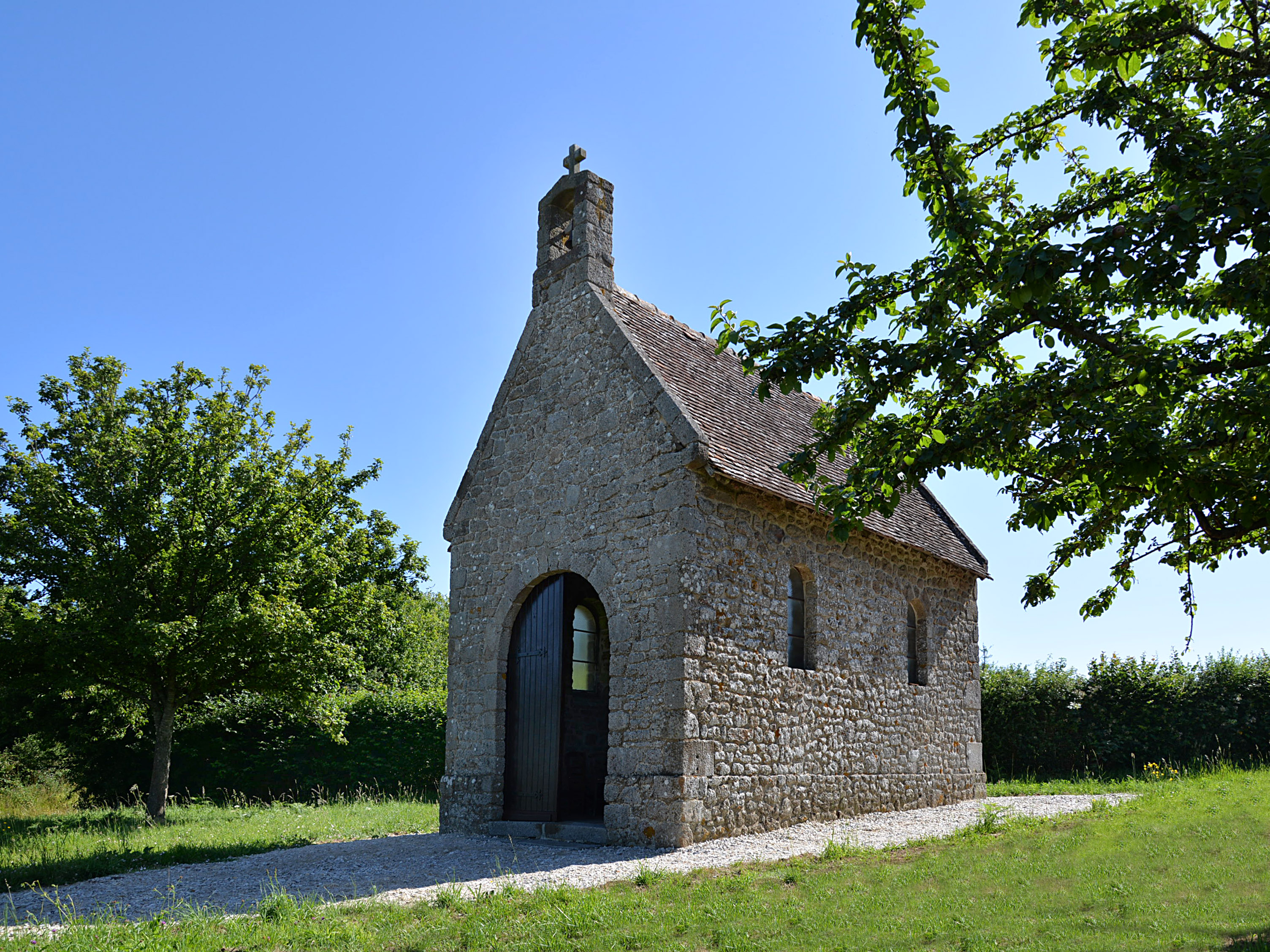
Notre-Dame chapelle

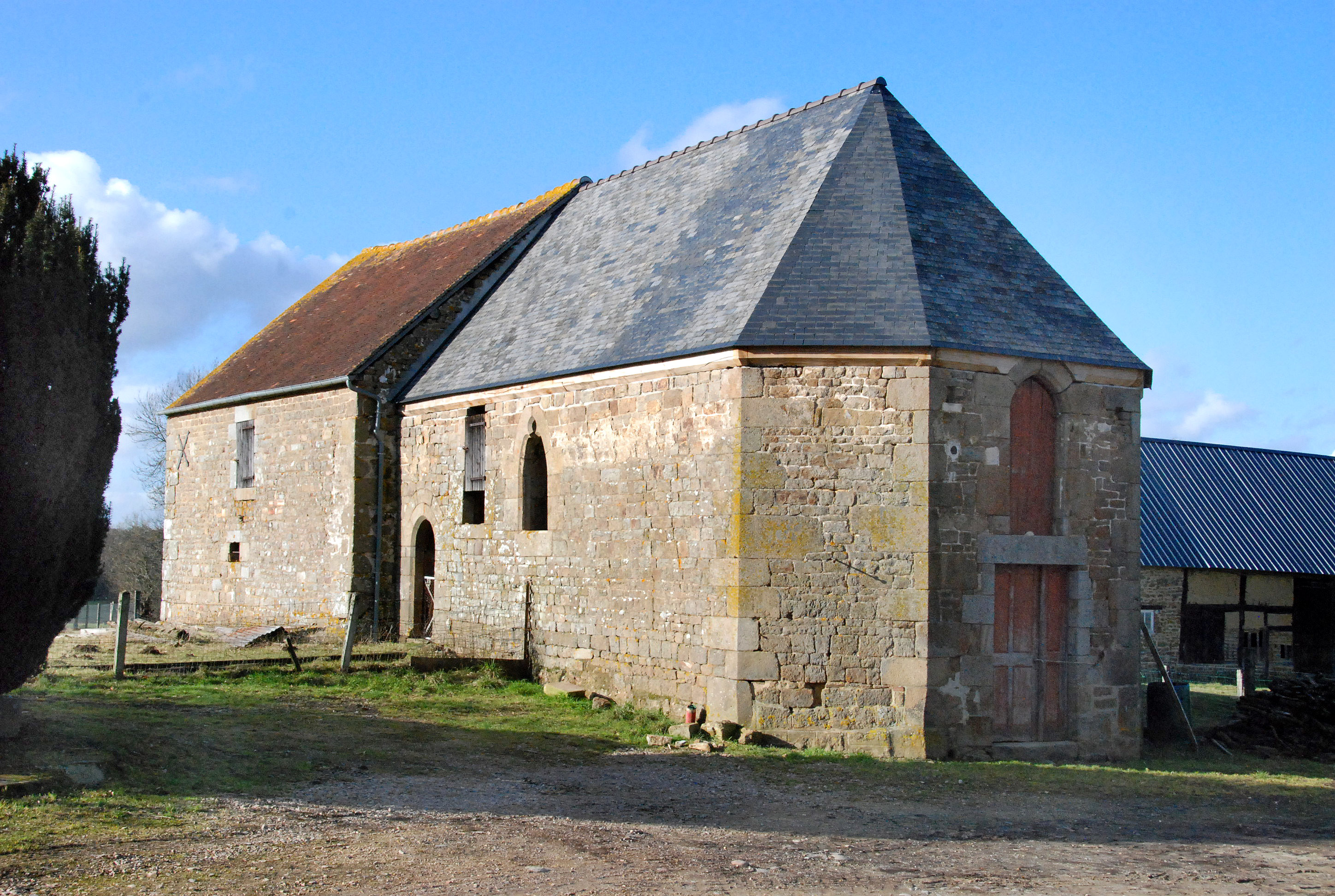
old Church of Saint-Denis

== See also ==
- Communes of the Orne department
