= Communauté de communes du Val d'Orne =

Federation of municipalities in Lower Normandy, France

Val d'Orne
- Communauté de communes
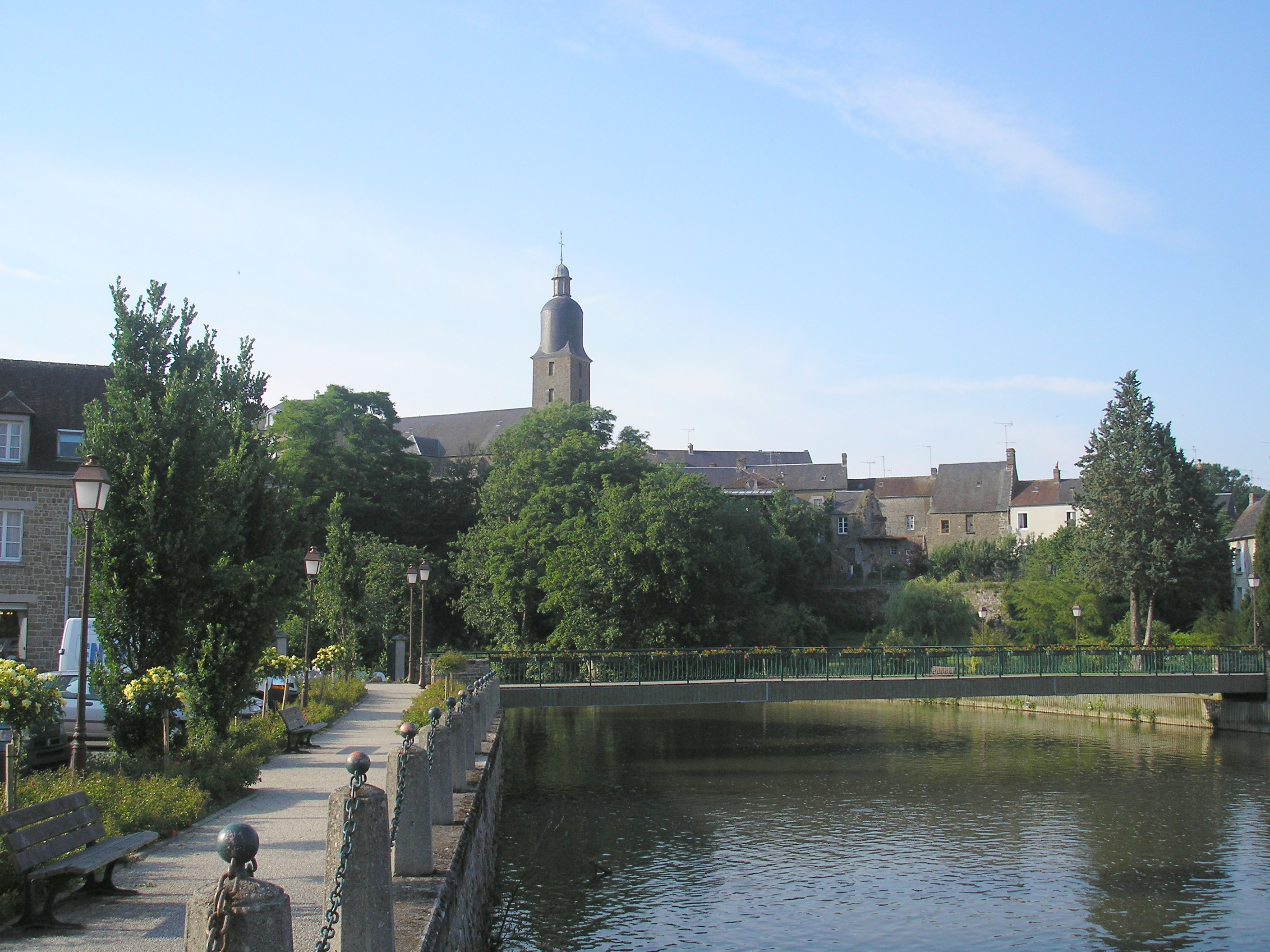
- Putangs Pont Ecrepin
- Country: France
- Region: Normandy
- Department: Orne
- No. of communes: {{{nbcomm}}}
- Established: December 1993

Government
  - President: Sébastien Leroux
- Area: 254.4 km^{2} (98.2 sq mi)
- Population (2019): 5,652
  - Density: 22.22/km^{2} (57.54/sq mi)
- Website: www.cc-valdorne.fr

The Communauté de communes Val d'Orne is a federation of municipalities (communauté de communes) in the Orne département and in the Normandy région of France. Its seat is Putanges-le-Lac. Its area is 254.4 km^{2}, and its population in 2019 was 5,652. It covers some of the Communes that make up the area known as Suisse Normande.

== Composition ==
The communauté de communes consists of the following 17 communes:

1. Bazoches-au-Houlme
2. Champcerie
3. Craménil
4. Faverolles
5. Giel-Courteilles
6. Habloville
7. Les Yveteaux
8. Lignou
9. Ménil-Gondouin
10. Ménil-Hermei
11. Ménil-Vin
12. Montreuil-au-Houlme
13. Neuvy-au-Houlme
14. Putanges-le-Lac
15. Saint-André-de-Briouze
16. Saint-Hilaire-de-Briouze
17. Sainte-Honorine-la-Guillaume
