= Canton of Athis-Val de Rouvre =

Coordinates: 48.81°N 0.50°W

The canton of Athis-Val de Rouvre (before March 2020: canton of Athis-de-l'Orne) is an administrative division of the Orne department, northwestern France. Its borders were modified at the French canton reorganisation which came into effect in March 2015. Its seat is in Athis-Val de Rouvre.

It consists of the following communes:

1. Athis-Val de Rouvre
2. Bazoches-au-Houlme
3. Berjou
4. Briouze
5. Cahan
6. Champcerie
7. Craménil
8. Durcet
9. Faverolles
10. Giel-Courteilles
11. Le Grais
12. Habloville
13. La Lande-Saint-Siméon
14. Lignou
15. Le Ménil-de-Briouze
16. Ménil-Gondouin
17. Ménil-Hermei
18. Ménil-Hubert-sur-Orne
19. Ménil-Vin
20. Montreuil-au-Houlme
21. Neuvy-au-Houlme
22. Pointel
23. Putanges-le-Lac
24. Saint-André-de-Briouze
25. Sainte-Honorine-la-Chardonne
26. Sainte-Honorine-la-Guillaume
27. Sainte-Opportune
28. Saint-Hilaire-de-Briouze
29. Saint-Philbert-sur-Orne
30. Les Yveteaux
