= Habloville =

- Commune
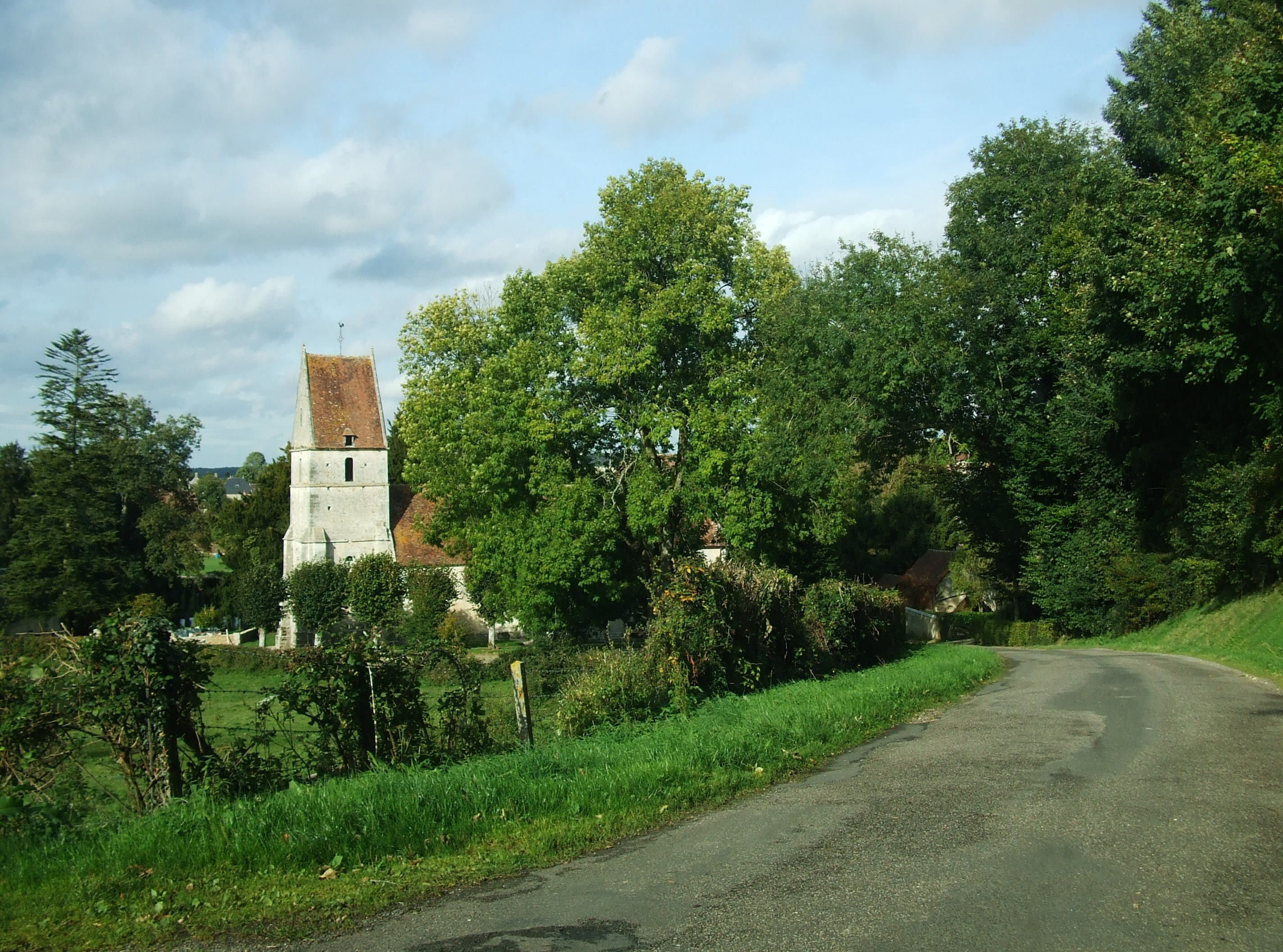
- Church of Our Lady of the Nativity in Habloville
- Location of Habloville
- Location within France Location within Normandy
- Coordinates: 48°47′16″N 0°10′06″W
- Country: France
- Region: Normandy
- Department: Orne
- Arrondissement: Argentan
- Canton: Athis-Val de Rouvre
- Intercommunality: Val d'Orne

Government
  - Mayor (2020–2026): Joël Caron
- Area^{1}: 11.7 km^{2} (4.5 sq mi)
- Elevation: 231 m (758 ft)
- Highest elevation: 252 m (827 ft)
- Lowest elevation: 170 m (560 ft)
- Population (2023): 336
  - Density: 28.7/km^{2} (74.4/sq mi)
- Time zone: UTC+01:00 (CET)
  - Summer (DST): UTC+02:00 (CEST)
- INSEE/Postal code: 61199 /61210
- ^{1} French Land Register data, which excludes lakes, ponds, glaciers > 1 km^{2} (0.386 sq mi or 247 acres) and river estuaries.

Habloville (French pronunciation: [ablɔvil]) is a commune in the Orne department in north-western France. The inhabitants of Habloville are called Hablovillais and Hablovillaises in French.

== Geography ==
The commune of Habloville borders Suisse Normande to the north, south and west and on its eastern border the communes of Ri and Rônai. The commune is spread over an area of 11.7 square kilometres (2,900 acres) with a maximum altitude of 252 metres (826 ft 9 in) and minimum of 170 metres (557 ft 9 in)

The commune is made up of the following collection of villages and hamlets, Habloville, Launay Percot, Bissey and Noirville.

Parts of the commune make up the area, the Plaine d'Argentan, which is known for its cereal growing fields and horse stud farms.

Habloville along with another 65 communes is part of a 20,593 hectare, Natura 2000 conservation area, called the Haute vallée de l'Orne et affluents.

The source of the river Baize is located at the village lavoir opposite the church.

Habloville benefits from an oceanic climate on the Köppen climate classification with mild winters and temperate summers.

=== Land distribution ===
According to the 2018 CORINE Land Cover assessment the vast majority of the land in the commune, 64% (745 hectares (1,840 acres)) is Arable land. The rest of the land is Meadows at 29%, 0.33% of land to Artificial Green spaces and 87 hectares (210 acres) or 7% is classed as Heterogeneous agricultural land.

== History ==
=== Neolithic period ===
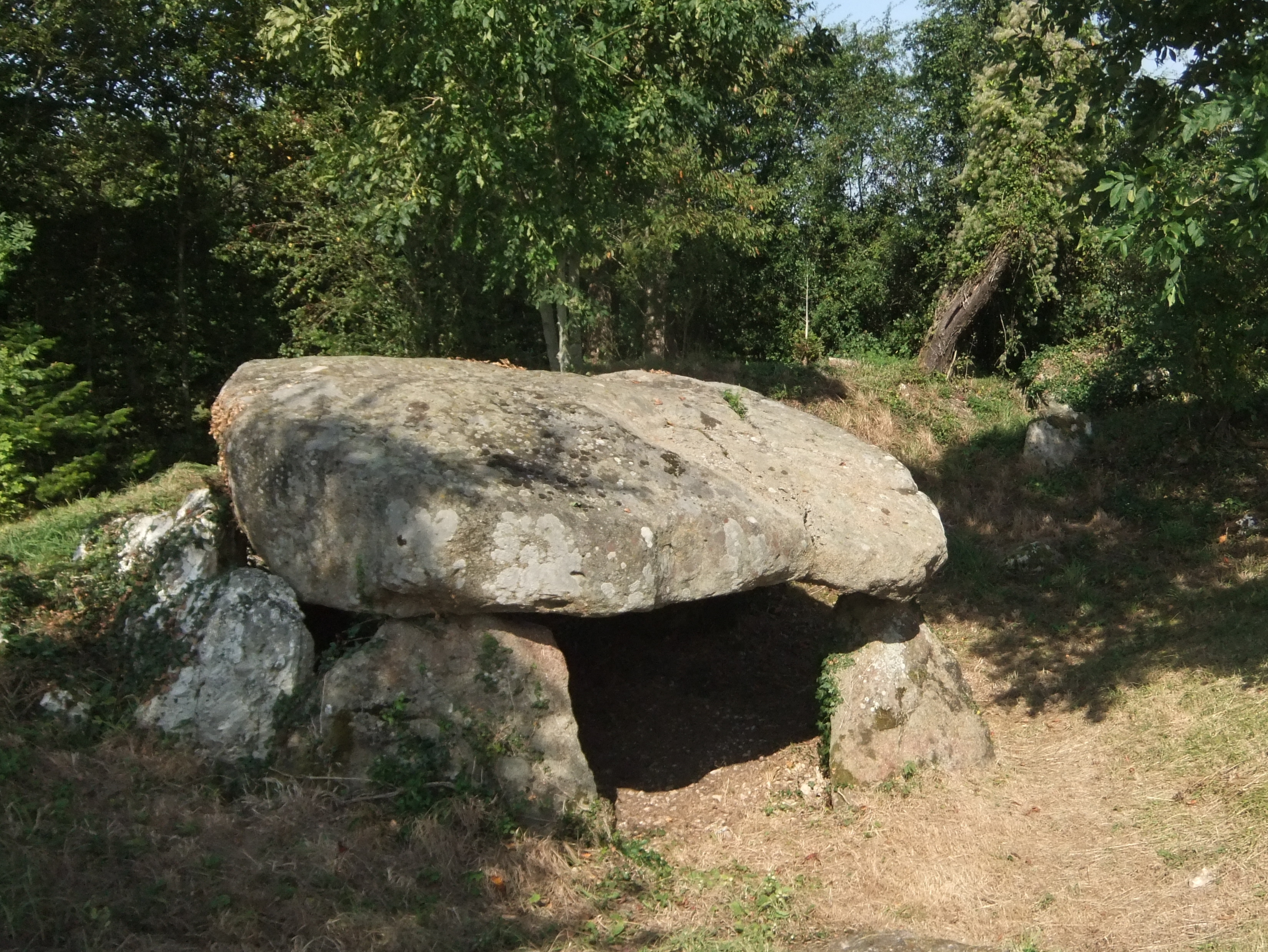
Dolmen des Bignes

Habloville contains evidence of Neolithic presence in the area with a dolmen or stone table measuring 3.25 meters by 2.95 meters called the Dolmen des Bignes.

The Dolmen is situated just North of another Neolithic site, this time a set of Tumulus, in Habloville called the Tumulus des Hogues which was listed as a historical monument in 1968.

=== Roman ===
The village Ablo-Villa, literally the domain of Hablon, was probably born in the Gallo-Roman era. Venus was worshiped near the Pirouet spring where two Tanagra figurines were found, and now stored in the National Archaeological Museum of France in Saint-Germain-en-Laye.

=== Middle Ages ===
The 11th Century saw a primitive church in the same spot as the current church, with text dated 1053 bearing the signature of William the Conqueror and Queen Mathilde was ceded by the lords of Bellême and given to the Abbey of Saint Julien in Tours. The Church was reconstructed in the 13th century with two chapels, Saint-Michel and Saint-Jacques, being built in the 15th Century.

In the Middle Ages the village experienced a certain prosperity as it is on a pilgrimage route to Mont-Saint-Michel and Santiago de Compostela.

=== 15th to 19th century ===
An area of Habloville, the stronghold of Noirville, was purchased in the 15th century by the Fouasse family, who took on the name, to become the Fouasse de Noirville Marquis. They owned the area until 1789 after an uprising of the local peasants.

Near the end of the 18th century, a Chappe telegraph was built in Habloville near the Château du Jardin in Bissey. On 29 May 1799 a small group of Chouans surrounded by 3,000 Republican soldiers fell back towards the telegraph, defended only by its employees. They were savagely murdered and the square tower supporting the great arms set on fire. After its reconstruction in 1800, the telegraph operated until the early 1850s.

Lime kilns were built between the areas of Monts and Noirville in the 18th century and used up until the 19th century. The kilns were in use until 1870 when they were shut down due to the use of chemical fertilizers in agriculture and of cement in construction.

=== 20th century ===
Habloville was liberated from the Germans on the 18 August 1944. The 10th SS Panzer Division Frundsberg defended the village against the Allied forces to hold an opening for the encircled German forces in the Falaise pocket. In their hurry to flee the offensive, the Germans left many items behind, including the 10.5 cm leFH 18 howitzer that is now displayed next to the war memorial.

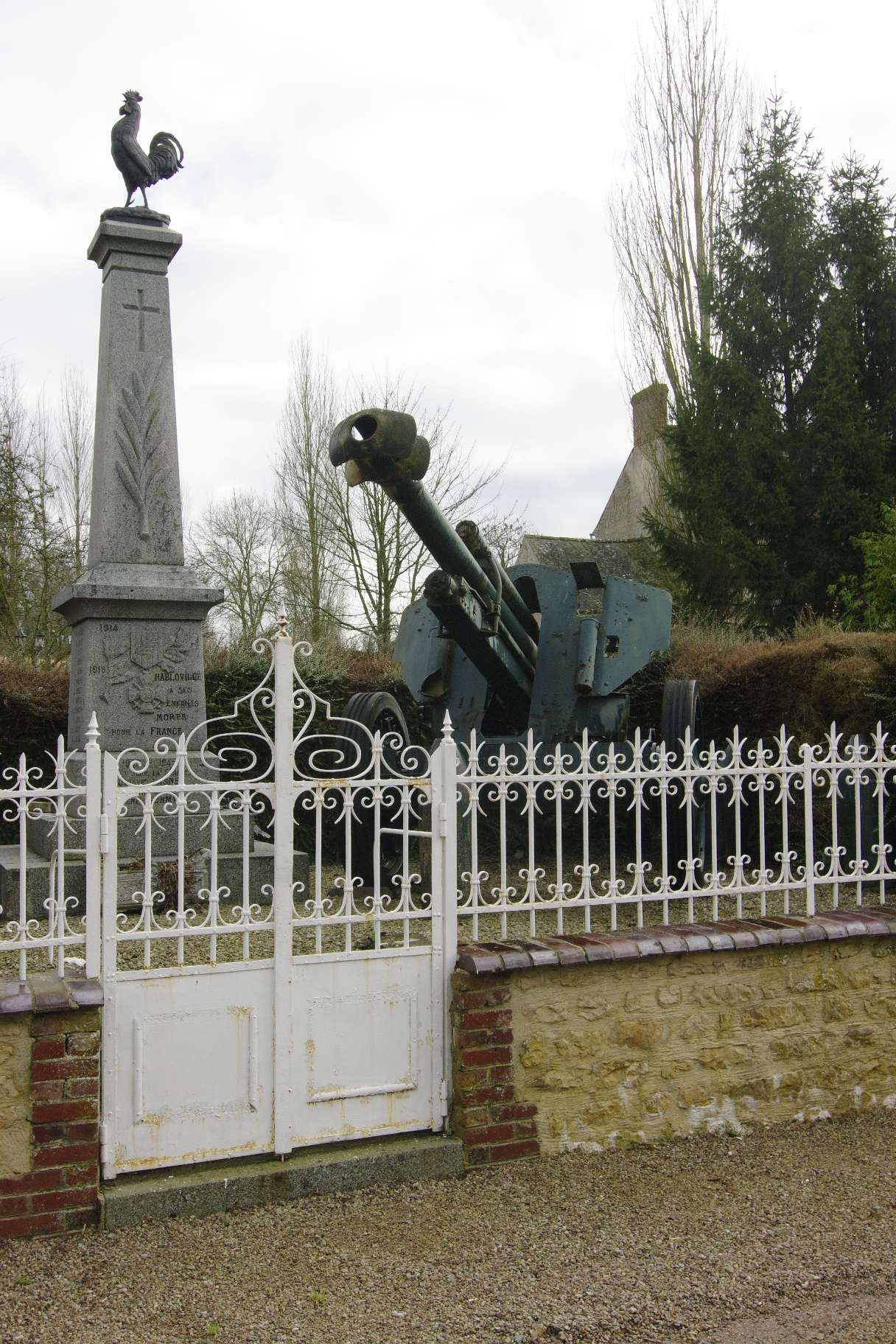
Habloville memorial

== Notable buildings and places ==
Villages Lavoir is the source of the River Baize.

Anciennes carrières souterraines d'Habloville is a Natura 2000 conservation site measuring 0.44 Hectares near Bissey. The site is two former Chalk mines that hosts five varieties of bats, listed in Annex 2 of the Habitats Directive, which are the Greater horseshoe bat, Lesser horseshoe bat, Geoffroy's bat, Bechstein's bat and the Greater mouse-eared bat.

=== National heritage sites ===
The Commune has three buildings and areas listed as a Monument historique

Church of Our Lady of the Nativity is a church built during the 13th to 15th century and the interior is classed as a Monument historique. It contains treasure of sacred art and furniture dating from the 15th to 18th century.

Dolmen des Bignes is a Neolithic dolmen that, is on the border of the commune with Neuvy-au-Houlme and was classed as a Monument historique in 1931.

Tumulus des Hogues is a Neolithic site containing Tumulus that was classed as a Monument historique in 1968.

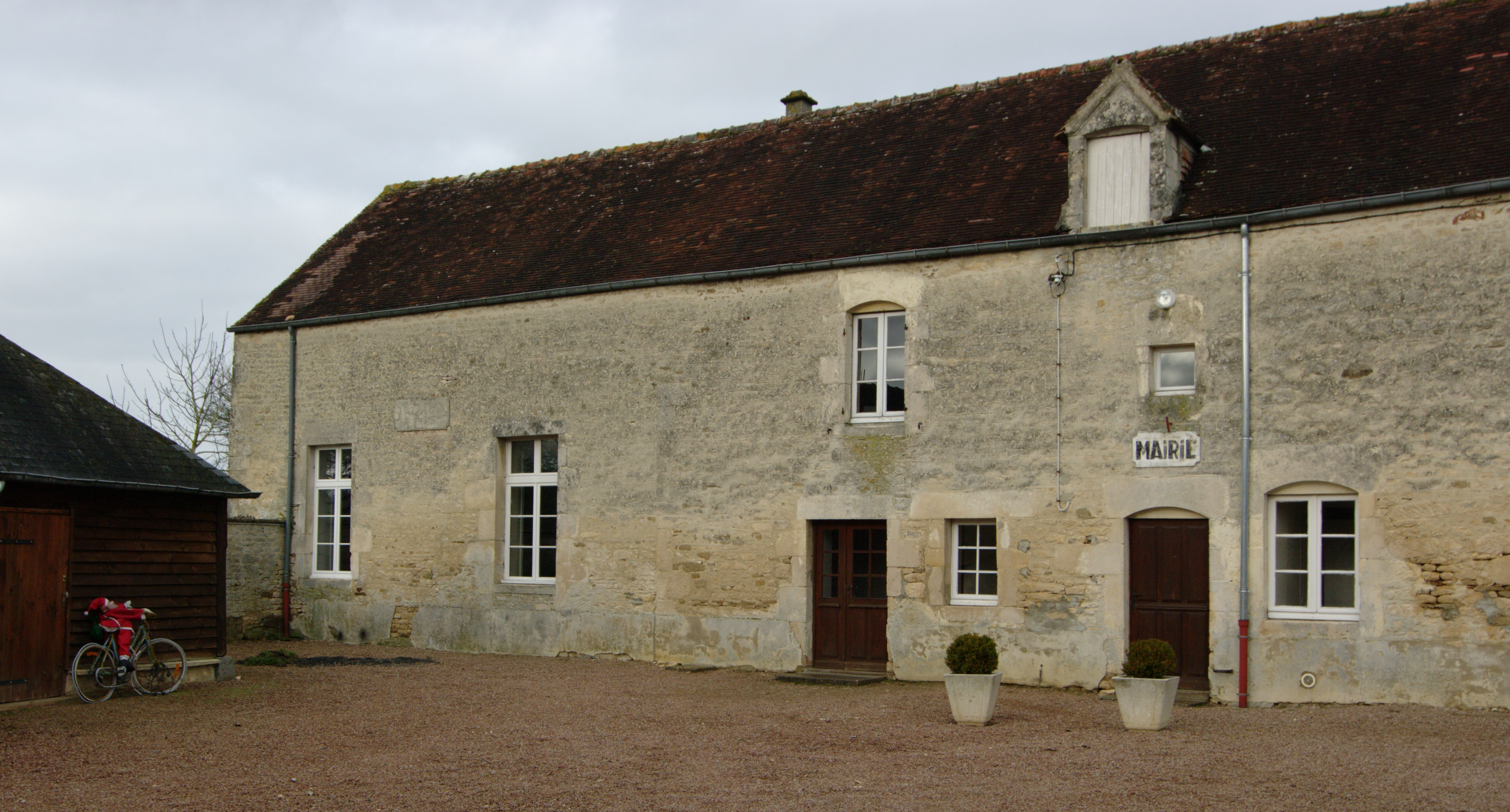
Habloville mayors office

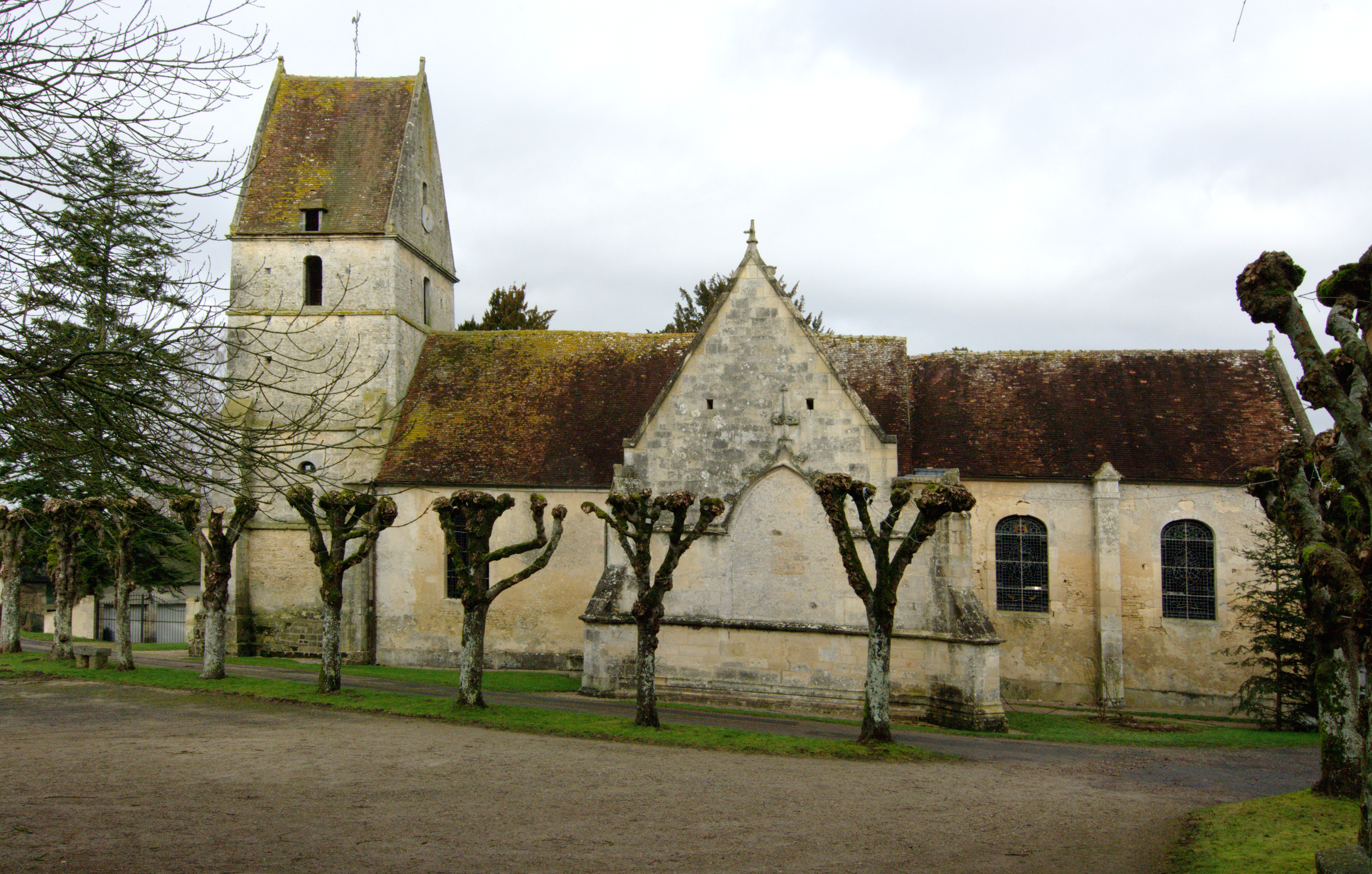
Habloville church

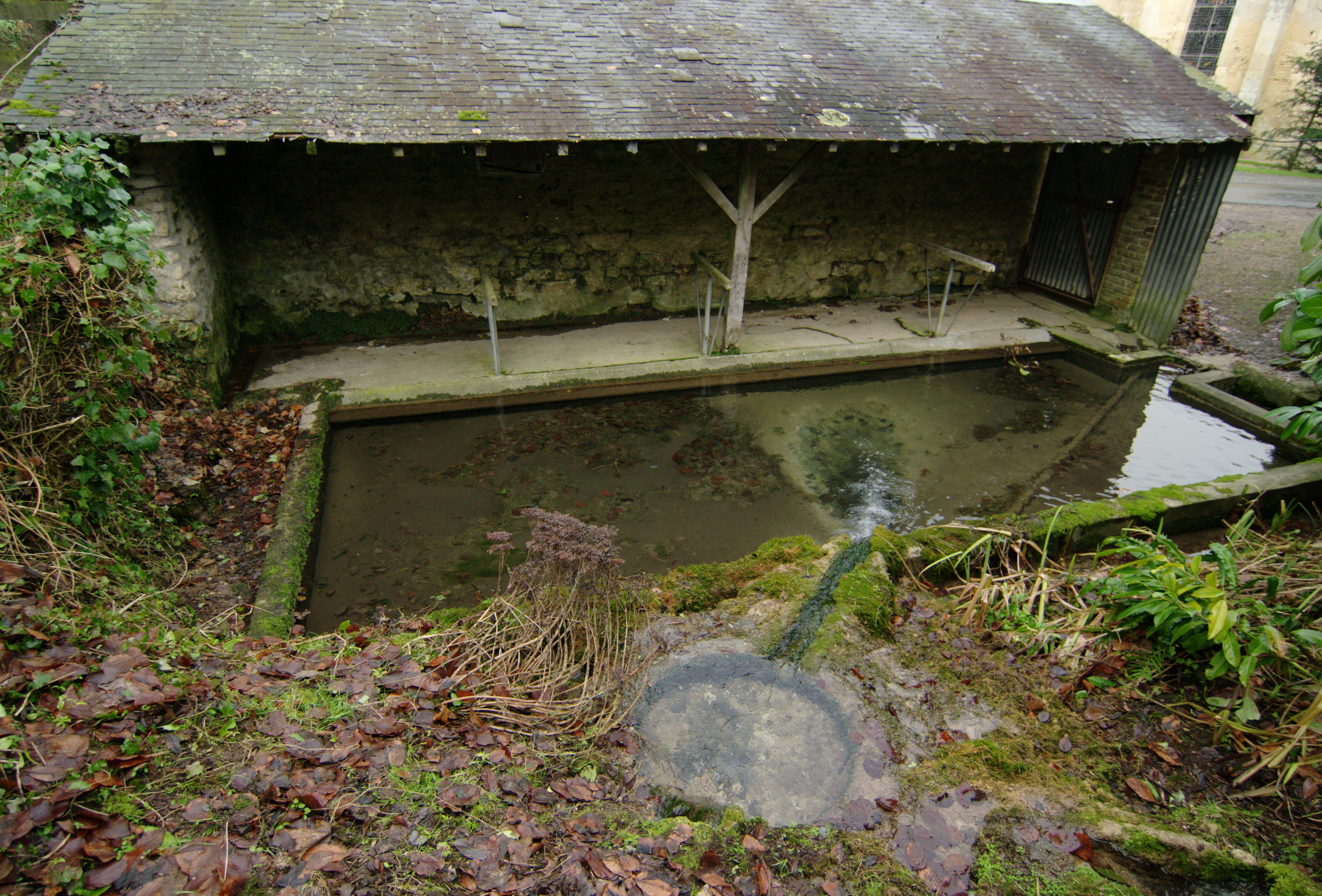
Lavoir in Habloville

== Population ==
Historical population
Year	Pop.	±% p.a.
1968	346	—
1975	262	−3.89%
1982	225	−2.15%
1990	262	+1.92%
1999	267	+0.21%
2007	315	+2.09%
2012	314	−0.06%
2017	323	+0.57%
2023	336	+0.66%
Source: INSEE

== See also ==
- Communes of the Orne department
