= Coordination of Information on the Environment =

Coordination of Information on the Environment (CORINE) is a European programme initiated in 1985 by the European Commission, aimed at gathering information relating to the environment on certain priority topics for the European Union (air, water, soil, land cover, coastal erosion, biotopes, etc.). Since 1994, the European Environment Agency (EEA) integrated CORINE in its work programme. EEA is responsible for providing objective, timely and targeted information on Europe's environment.

== Bibliography ==
- CORINE Biotope Manual, publ. 1992 EU, ISBN 99924-41-57-7
- CORINE: Examples of the Use of the Programme 1985–1990, publ. 1991 EU, ISBN 92-826-2427-7
- CORINE: Land Cover Technical Guide, publ. 1994 EU, ISBN 92-826-2578-8
- Search for CORINE literature by the EEA
