= Gondouin =

Gondouin is a French surname. Notable people with the surname include:

- Charles Gondouin (1875–1947), French rugby union player and tug of war competitor
- Jacques Gondouin (1737–1818), French architect
- Sébastien Gondouin (born 1976), French footballer
- Valentin Gondouin (born 1999), French long-distance runner

== See also ==
- Ménil-Gondouin, a commune of Orne, France
