= The Suisse Normande =

Region in France

Coordinates: 48°55′N 0°30′W

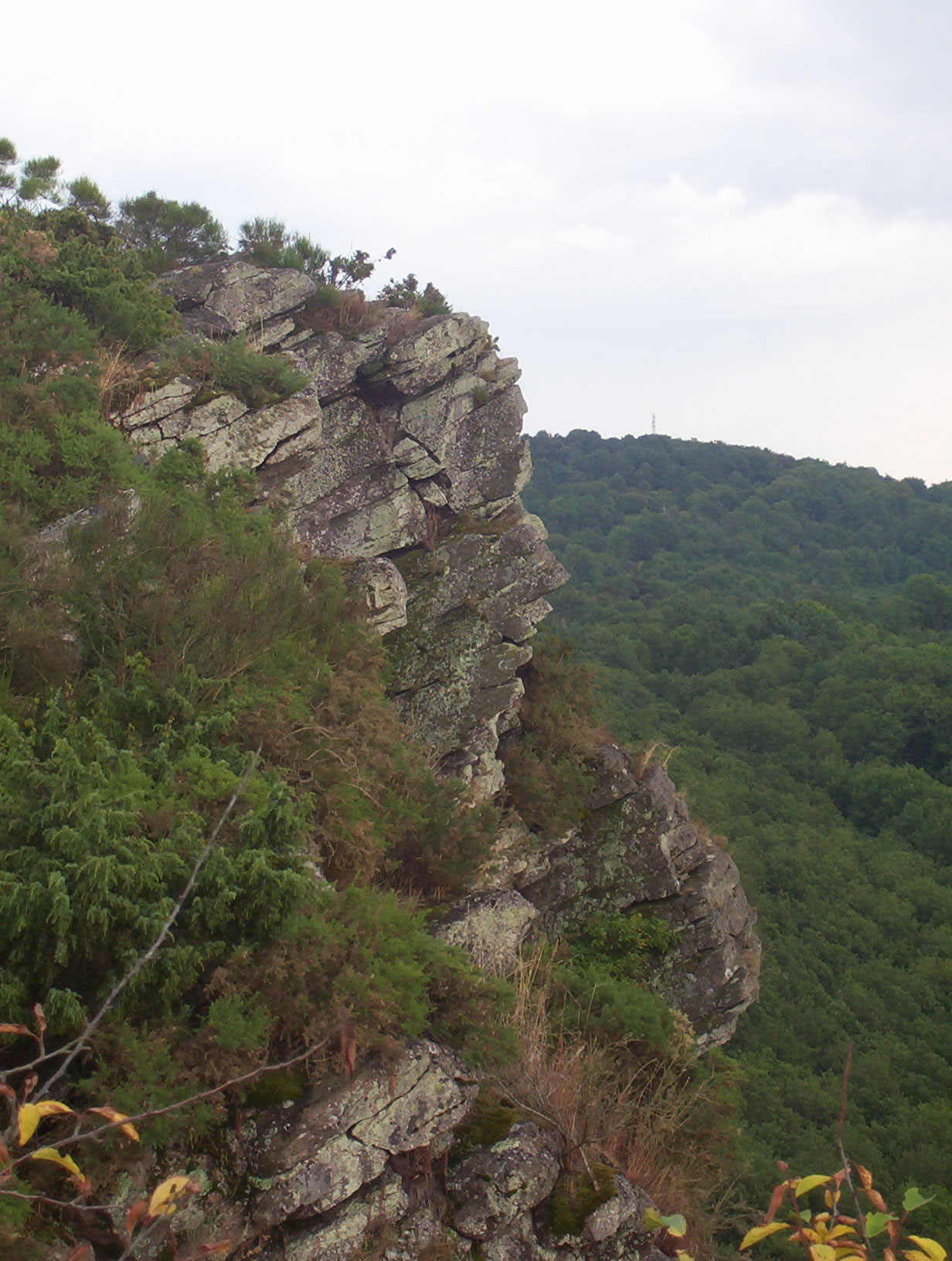
Rock of Oëtre

The Suisse Normande (French: Suisse normande [sɥis nɔʁmɑ̃d]; Norman: Suisse nouormande) is a term for part of Normandy, France, in the border region of the departments Calvados and Orne. Its name comes from its rugged and verdant relief, apparently resembling the Swiss Alps, with gorges carved by the river Orne and its tributaries, and by erosion in the Armorican Massif between Putanges-Pont-Écrepin and Thury-Harcourt. The river has created a generally rugged landscape.

The area is a popular tourist destination attracting approximately 2.5 million visitors per year.

Churches, houses and farm buildings have a style closer to what is found across the English Channel in the United Kingdom (i.e., stone buildings with slate roofs), rather than the timber structures of the Pays d'Auge.

There are many outdoor tourist activities: canoeing, horse riding, rock climbing, hang gliding, kayaking, paragliding and mountain biking.

== History ==
The area was first described in 1828 as being like Switzerland in appearance when local historian, Jean-Frédéric Galeron (1794-1838), describes the area of Saint-Clair, Clécy and Athis and Pont-d'Ouilly as 'It's a little Switzerland for the inhabitants of Falaise'.

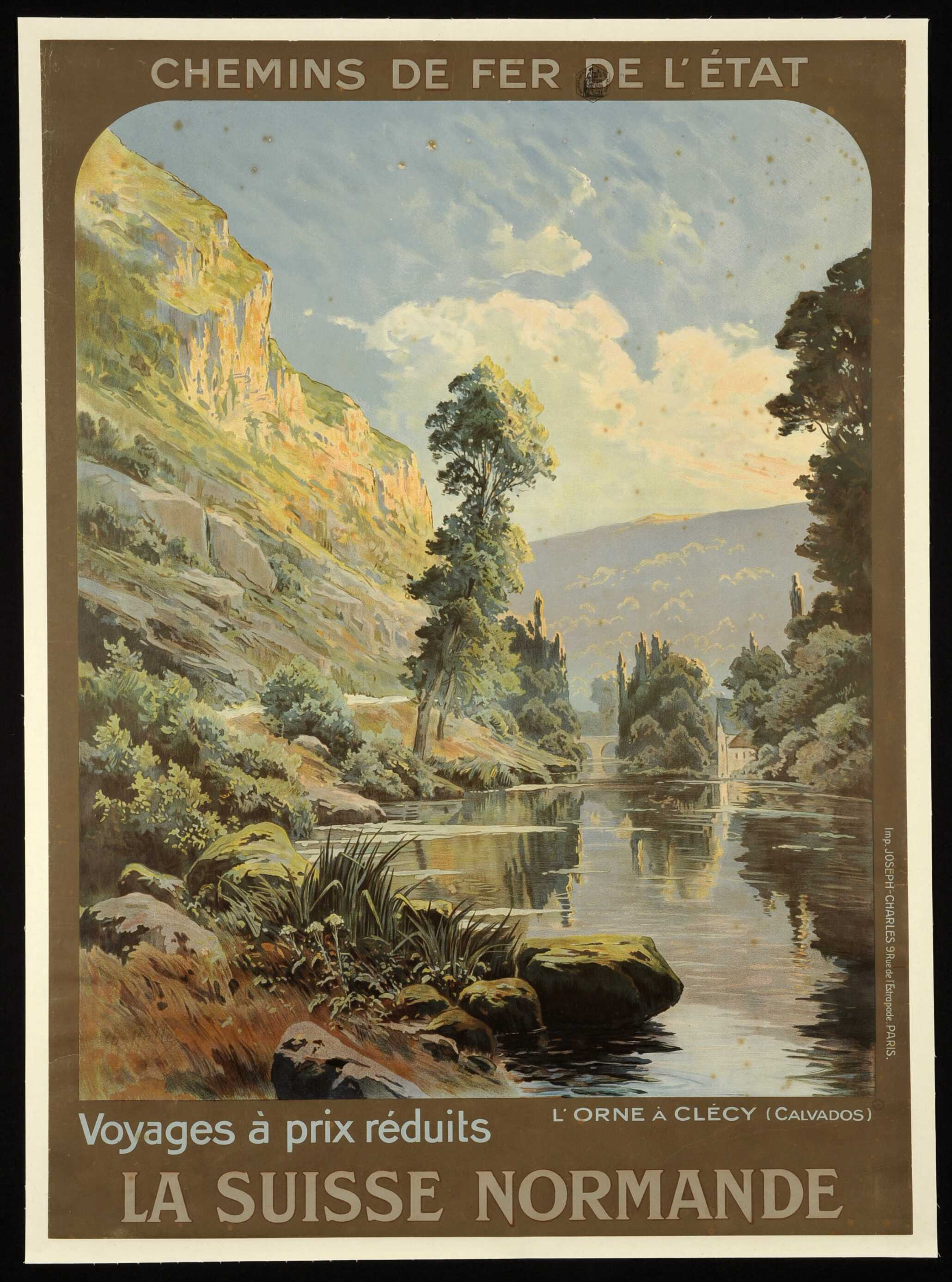
Railway poster for Suisse Normande circa 1900

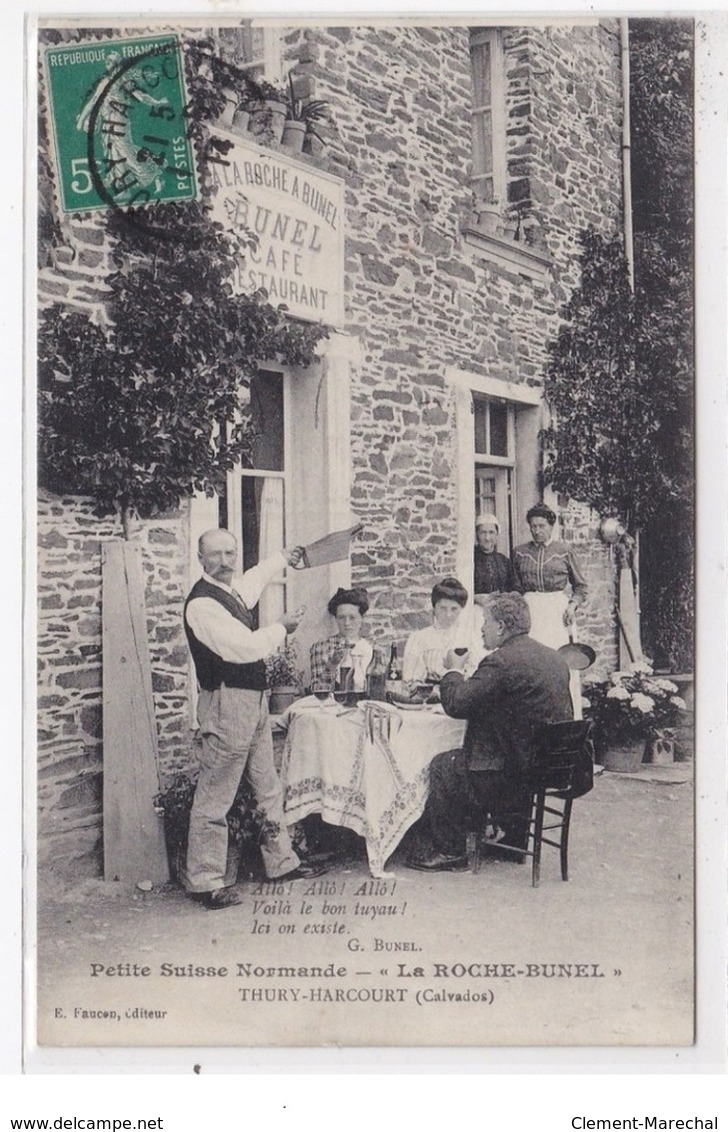
Postcard from 1914 of La Roche-Bunel Thury-Harcourt petite Suisse Normande

The term “Suisse Normande” was popularized in particular by the railway companies which made the sites of the area accessible to a greater number and use it for promotional purposes. A State Railways poster, from the 1900s, promotes "travel at reduced prices" and shows, under the title "La Suisse normande", a view of the Orne valley in Clecy. In these same years, postcards began to fix the name, and hoteliers also took advantage of thiese flattering images, for example in the 1900s, Clécy had a “hotel of little Switzerland” and a “hotel of the Norman Alps”.

After the First World War, the mayor of Clécy wanted to cement the town as a major tourist resort notably by creating safe drinking water and the proper treatment of effluents, a rarity for the time. In 1932, the mayor, then invited the Under-Secretary of State for Tourism, who visited Thury-Harcourt, LaRoche d'Oëtre, Falaise, and solemnly declared Clécy capital of Swiss Normandy. In 1933, Father Joseph Delacotte wrote a tourist guide entitled "La Suisse normande", explaining the area was larger than what was originally defined and in 1935, the tourist office of the Suisse Normande had 74 signposts produced, with its header, which showed tourists the sites to visit.4

In 1960 Rabodanges Lake was formed by EDF when they created a hydroelectric dam on the Orne River

In 2007 Thury-Harcourt hosted the European Canoe Polo Championship.

== Geography ==
Suisse Normande is located at the end of the Armorican Massif. In the hills, small, steep fields are often bordered by thick hedges or granite dry stone walls and have dense vegetation. Mont Pinçon, is the highest point in Norman Switzerland, at 362 metres (1,188 ft) in elevation.

The main water course ways through the area are the river Orne and four of its tributaries, Noireau, Rouvre, Laize and the Baize. In addition, two more rivers run through the area and merge with the Noireau, La Vere and the Druance. From Putanges-Pont-Écrepin part of the Orne has been made into an artificial 6 km long lake covering 240 acres called Rabodanges Lake.

=== Towns and Communes ===
The main towns are Athis-de-l'Orne, Clécy, Condé-en-Normandie, Pont-d'Ouilly, Putanges-Pont-Écrepin and Thury-Harcourt.

A total of 75 communes from six different Communauté de communes make up Suisse Normand as shown below;

Communauté de communes Cingal-Suisse Normande

1. Cauville
2. Cesny-les-Sources
3. Clécy
4. Combray
5. Cossesseville
6. Croisilles
7. Culey-le-Patry
8. Donnay
9. Espins
10. Esson
11. Grimbosq
12. La Pommeraye
13. Le Bô
14. Le Vey
15. Les Moutiers-en-Cinglais
16. Martainville
17. Meslay, Calvados
18. Montillières-sur-Orne
19. Mutrécy
20. Ouffières
21. Saint-Lambert
22. Saint-Laurent-de-Condel
23. Saint-Omer
24. Saint-Rémy
25. Thury-Harcourt-le-Hom

Communauté de communes Intercom de la Vire au Noireau

1. Condé-en-Normandie
2. La Villette, Calvados
3. Périgny
4. Pontécoulant
5. Saint-Denis-de-Méré
6. Terres de Druance

Communauté d'agglomération Flers Agglo

1. Athis-Val de Rouvre
2. Aubusson
3. Berjou
4. Cahan
5. Caligny
6. Cerisy-Belle-Étoile
7. Durcet
8. La Bazoque
9. La Lande-Saint-Siméon
10. Ménil-Hubert-sur-Orne
11. Montilly-sur-Noireau
12. Sainte-Honorine-la-Chardonne
13. Sainte-Opportune
14. Saint-Philbert-sur-Orne
15. Saint-Pierre-du-Regard

Communauté de communes du Pays de Falaise

1. Bonnœil
2. Cordey
3. Fourneaux-le-Val
4. Le Détroit
5. Le Mesnil-Villement
6. Les Isles-Bardel
7. Les Loges-Saulces
8. Leffard
9. Martigny-sur-l'Ante
10. Noron-l'Abbaye
11. Pierrefitte-en-Cinglais
12. Pierrepont
13. Pont-d'Ouilly
14. Rapilly
15. Saint-Germain-Langot
16. Saint-Martin-de-Mieux
17. Tréprel

Communauté de communes du Val d'Orne

1. Bazoches-au-Houlme
2. Champcerie
3. Craménil
4. Giel-Courteilles
5. Ménil-Gondouin
6. Ménil-Hermei
7. Ménil-Vin
8. Neuvy-au-Houlme
9. Putanges-le-Lac
10. Saint-André-de-Briouze
11. Sainte-Honorine-la-Guillaume

Terres d'Argentan Interco

1. Écouché-les-Vallées

=== Conservation areas ===
Suisse Normande has several protected areas that exist within it that are a Natura 2000 conservation areas;

- Bassin de la Druance
- Haute vallée de l'Orne et affluents
- Vallée de l'Orne et ses affluents

== Points of Interest ==
- The Rock of Oëtre, a sheer cliff overlooking the Rouvre from 118 metres (387 ft) above, is a popular tourist site. It can resemble a human face seen in profile.
- The Rabodanges hydro-electric dam and its feed lake starting at Putanges-le-Lac which can be used for fishing, powerboating and water skiing.
- Museum of Pont-Érambourg is a museum based at the former Pont-Érambourg station in Saint-Pierre-du-Regard, dedicated to railway heritage. In addition the museum has a 13km Velorail route that is open to the public.
- Souleuvre Viaduct - Originally built by Gustave Eiffel in 1893. The site is now an amusement park, featuring Bungee jumps, a botanical garden and other attractions.
- Museum of the liberation of Berjou retraces the fighting of August 15, 16 and 17, 1944 around the River Noireau as part of the battle of the Falaise pocket.
- The town of Pont-d'Ouilly and its café by the Orne riverside, which every Sunday makes space on the river for the Canoe polo team to practice. (The town's team is one of the best in France).
- The town of Clécy and its cafés by the Orne riverside, for its pedalos, and closeness to cliffs suited to climbing, hang-gliding and paragliding, in the communes of Saint-Omer and Vey.
- Jardin Intérieur à Ciel Ouvert is a public garden in Athis-Val de Rouvre that is classified as a Jardins remarquables by the Ministry of Culture and the Comité des Parcs et Jardins de France.
- Renaissance Garden of Sainte-Honorine-la-Chardonne another garden classed as Jardins remarquables by the Ministry of Culture and the Comité des Parcs et Jardins de France based in Sainte-Honorine-la-Chardonne
- The Château de Pontécoulant the home of the Le Doulcet de Pontécoulant family since the 14th century. The Chateau today dates mostly from the 16th and 17th century. It was classed as a Monument historique in 1927. Its 18th century gardens were classed as Monument Historique 60 years later.
- The Château de la Pommeraye, an 18th-century château, built in 1743 set in a verdant landscape. It was classed as a Monument historique in 1954.
- Château Ganne Remains of a fortified Castle dating back to the 11th century and classed as a Monument historique in 2000. It is located in La Pommeraye.
- The Château de La Tourelle or Château du Bas Martimbosq, feudal vestige of the 14th century, adjoins the banks of the Orne, on the municipality of Curcy-sur-Orne. The current residence was restored and fitted out in the last century, in particular by singer-composer, Nicolas Peyrac then by the Briout family. Today it still has the original towers, the vestiges of the chapel and remaining outer walls, a typical element of the stone medieval heritage of Norman Switzerland today.
- Eglise vivante et parlante, also known as the living and talking church, is a Uniquely decorated church in Ménil-Gondouin. When the local priest, Victor Paysant, arrived in 1873 he decorated the interior and the outside of the church with representations of paradise and hell, religious texts, paintings and frescoes.
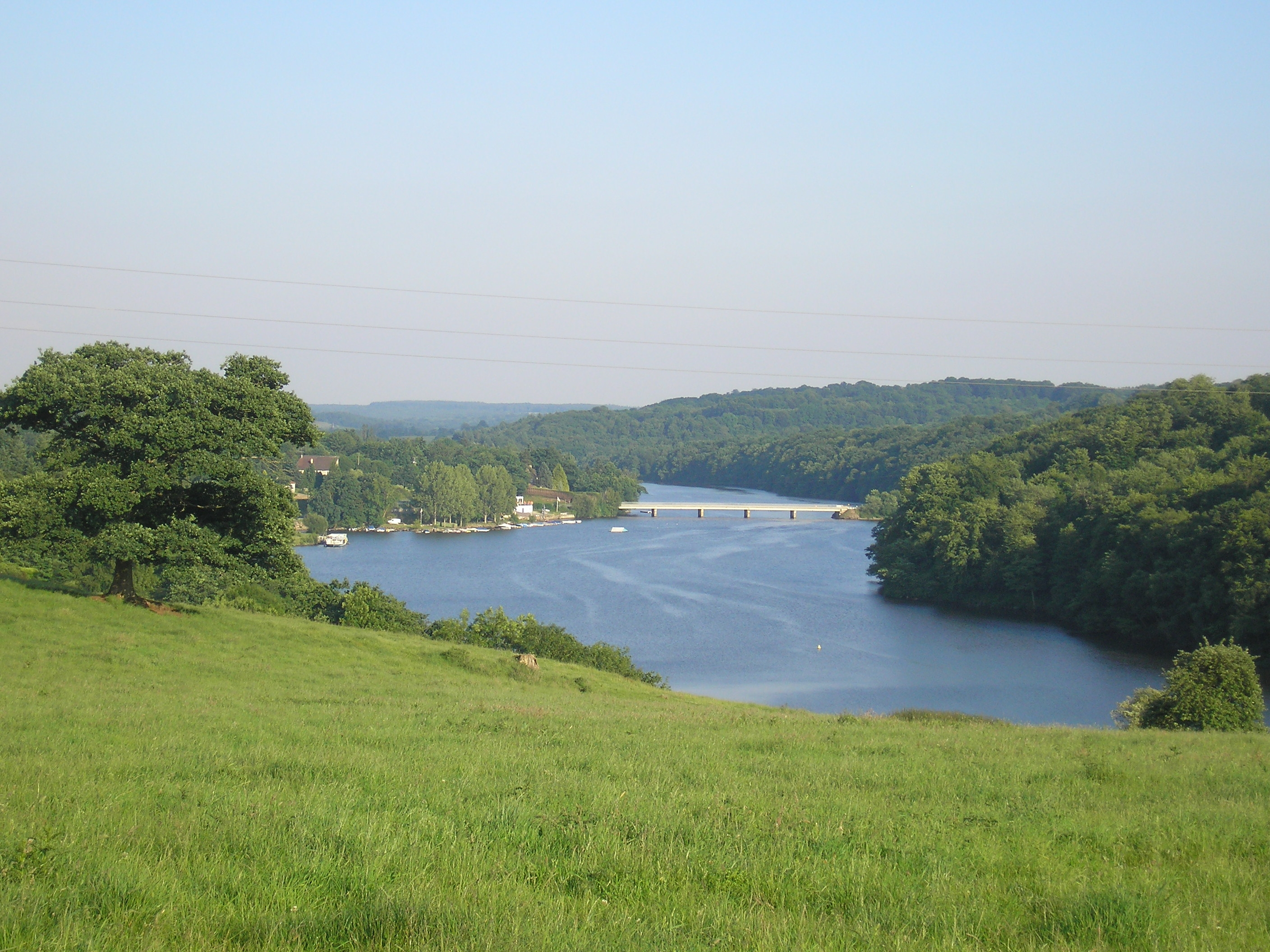
Rabodanges Lac

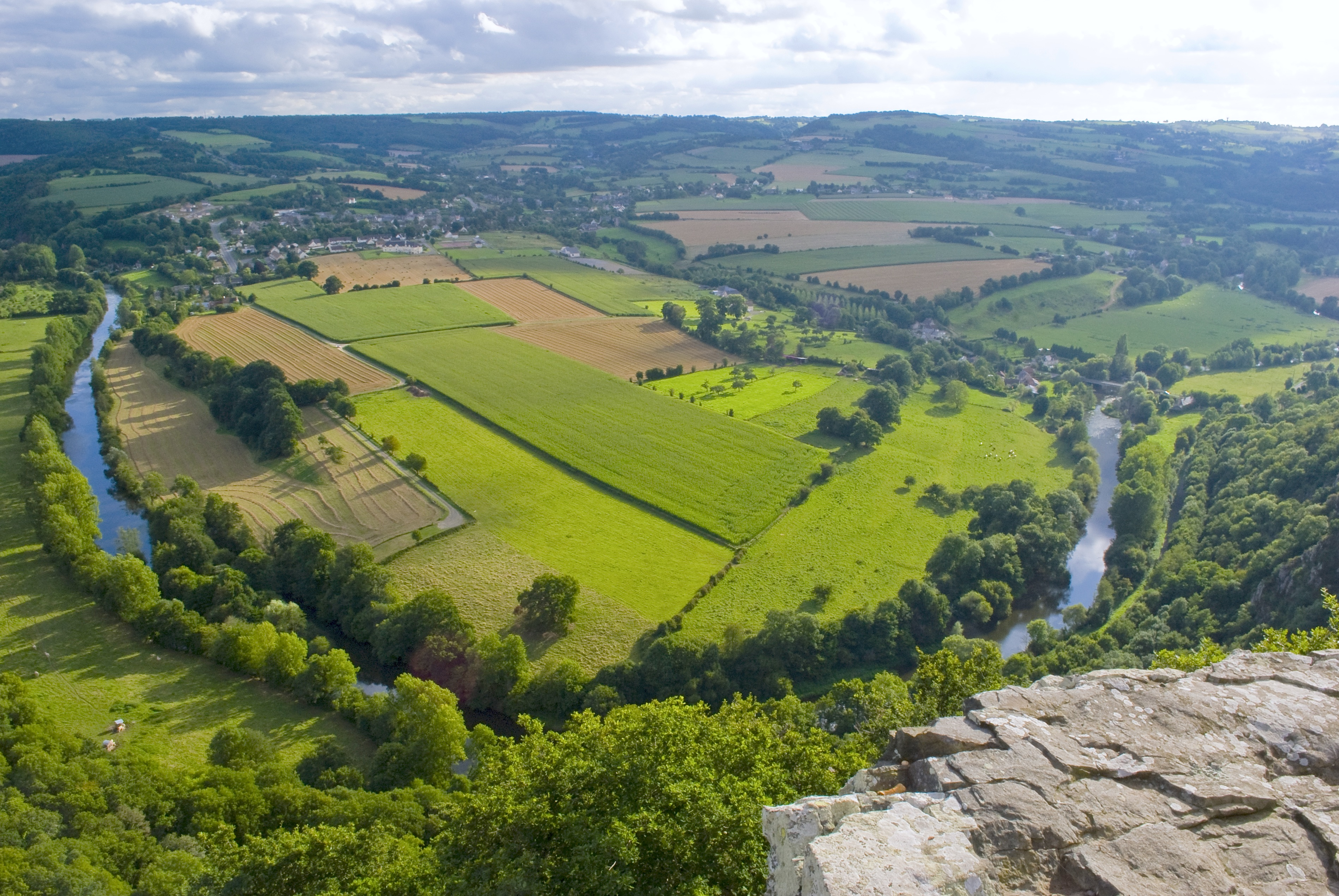
View of Saint-Omer

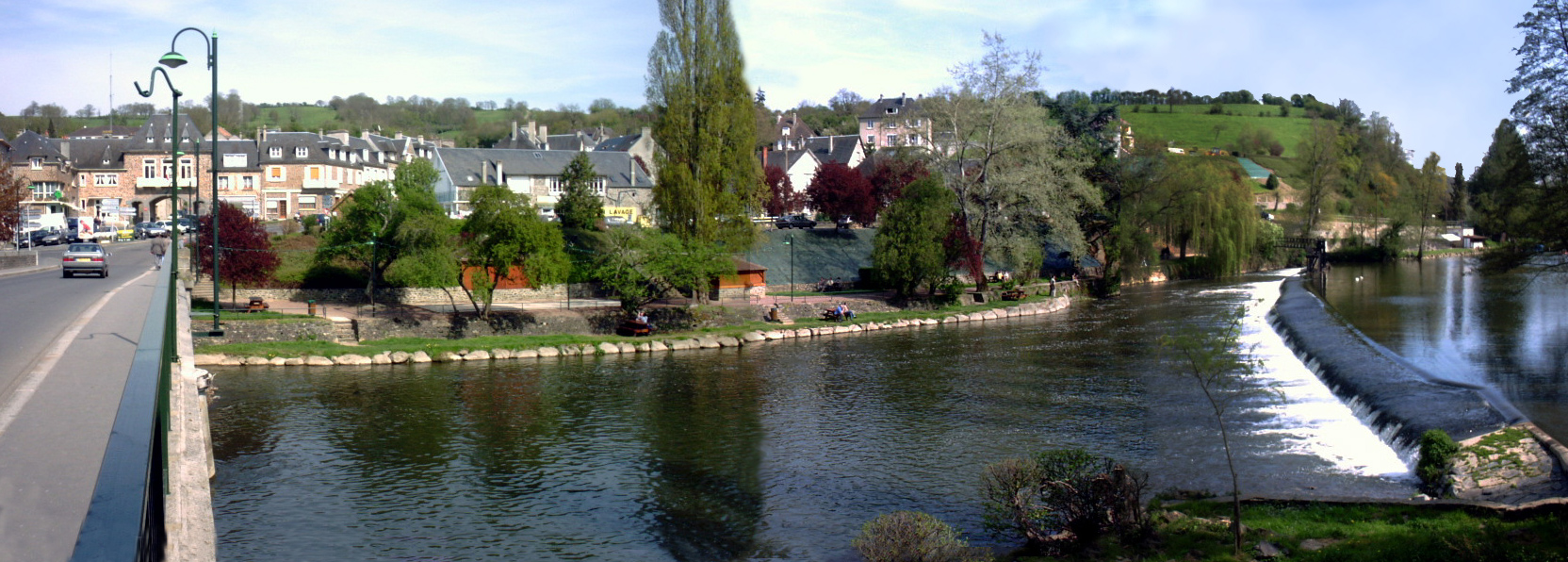
Pont-d'Ouilly

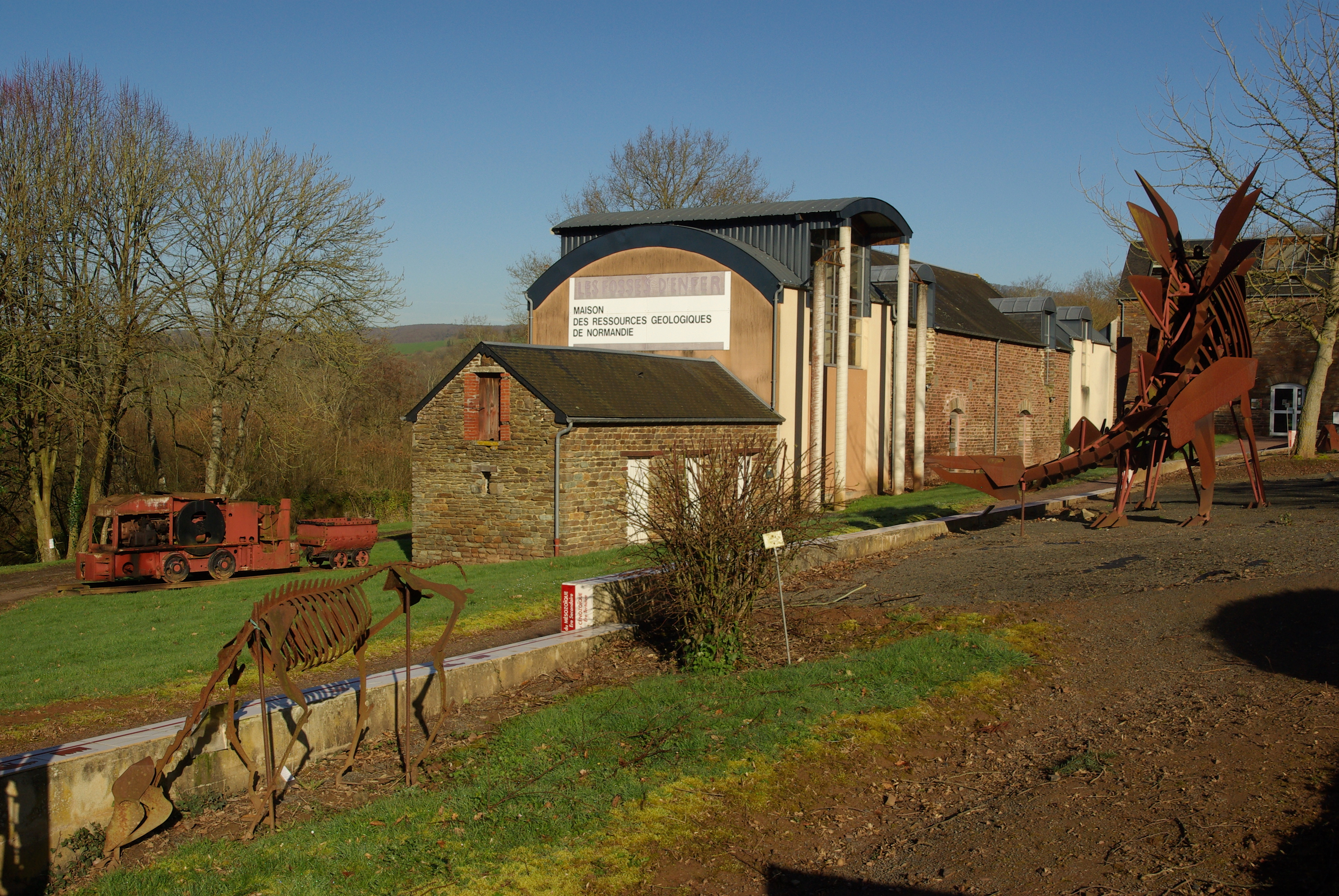
'Pits of Hell' Museum.

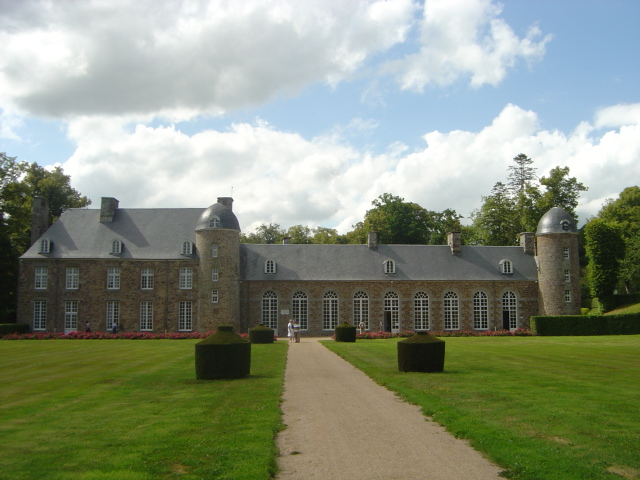
Chateau de Pontecoulant

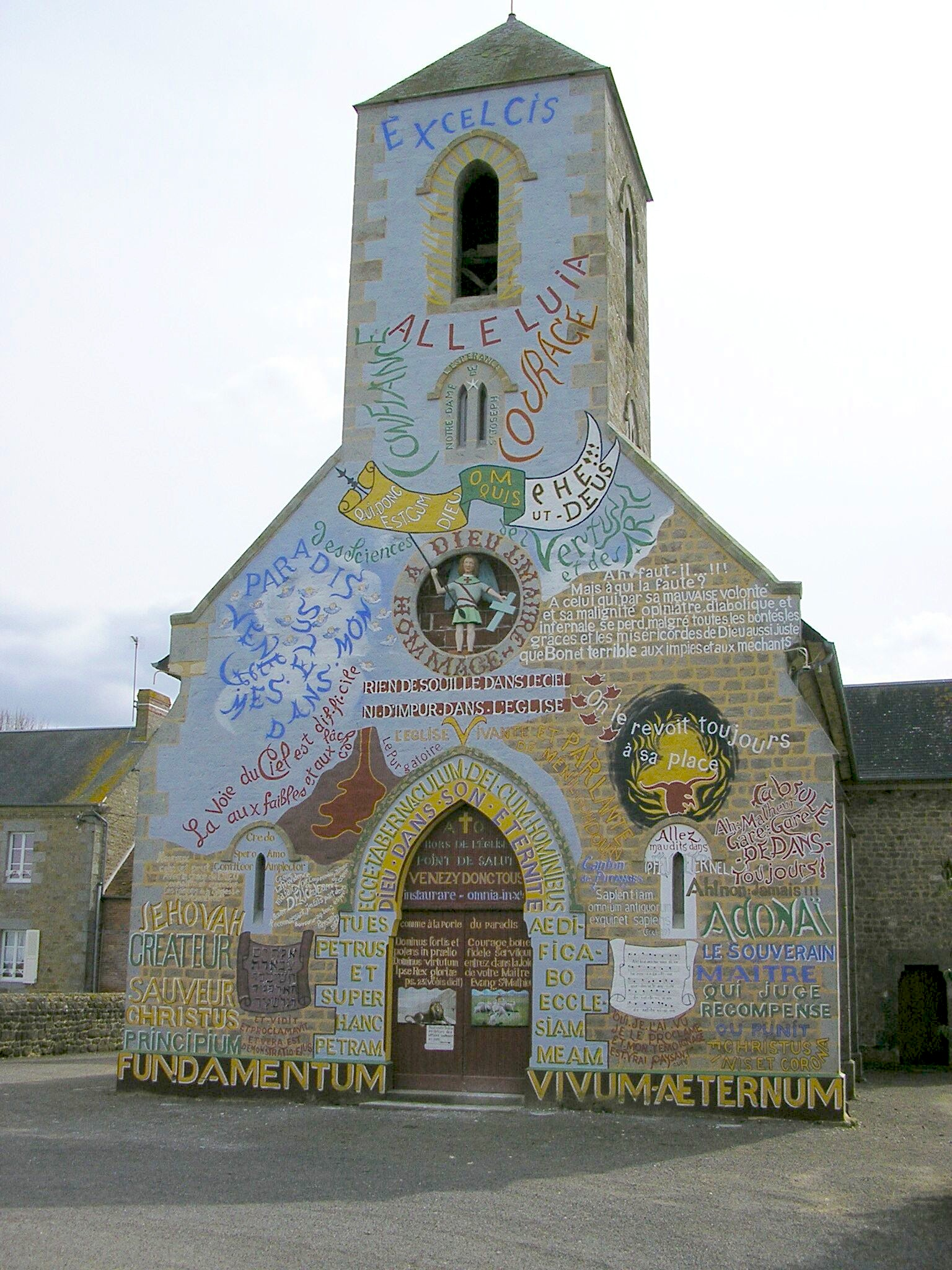
Eglise vivante et parlante

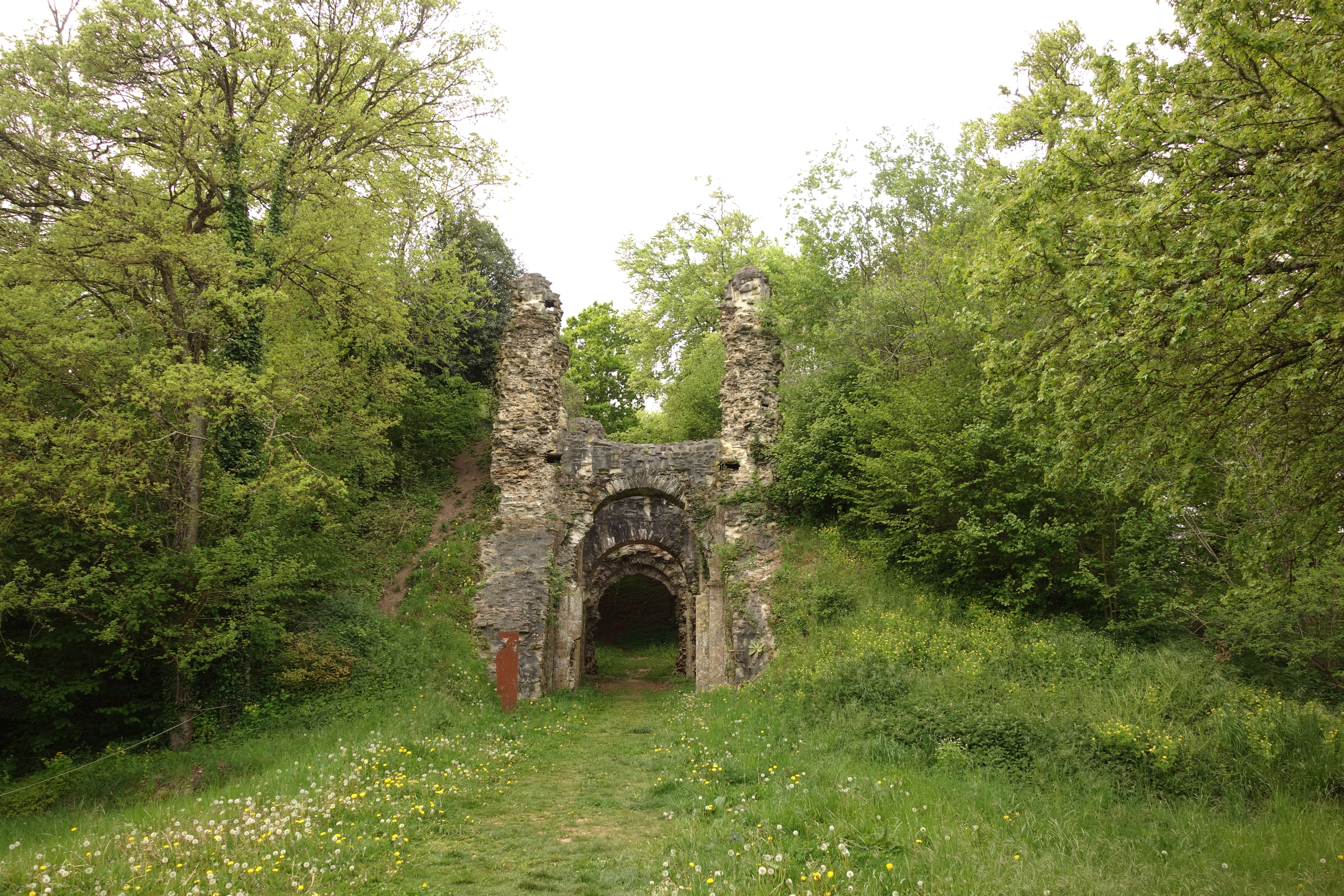
Tower Gates of Château Ganne

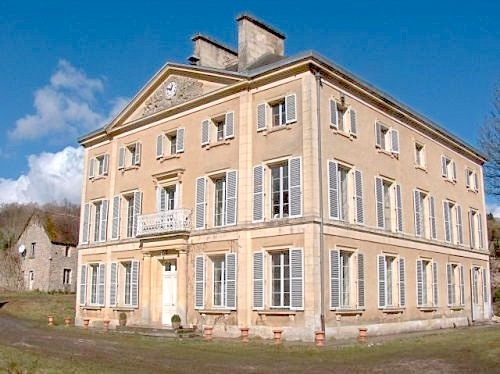
Château de la Pommeraye

== Sport and activities ==
The GR® de Pays Tour de la Suisse Normande is a GR footpath, 113 km in length that was voted France’s favourite walking route in 2023.

Two major Canoe polo events, the 2007, European championship and 2014 ICF World Championships both at Thury-Harcourt-le-Hom have been hosted here.

Stage 6 of the 2025 Tour de France passed through Suisse Normande.

The area has an 18 hole golf course based in the commune of Clécy called Golf de Clecy Cantelou. Condé-en-Normandie has a swimming pool the Espace Aquatique de Condé-en-Normandie, which has been open since 1999.

== Culture ==
- Le festival des Extraverties is an annual 3 day festival organised each Spring by the Communauté de communes du Pays de Falaise and Communauté d'agglomération Flers Agglo. The festival is based on several sites within the area and celebrates the activities that can be done in the local area while also featuring concerts and free shows. The festival has been going since 2017 and attracts about 20,000 people each time.
- Saint-Denis fair - Since at least 1789 the commune of Montilly-sur-Noireau has had a fair each year at the start of October. The fair features a variety of rides and exhibitors attracting over 100,000 visitors per year.
- Eskape festival is an annual Techno and Electronic dance music weekend festival that occurs in Montilly-sur-Noireau between the end of July to mid August. It attracts about 20,000 visitors per year.
- Les Bichoiseries is an annual Contemporary music festival each June that occurs on Mount Cerisy in Cerisy-Belle-Étoile. It attracts about 6,600 visitors per year and has been ongoing since 2005.

== See also ==
- Little Switzerland (landscape)
