= Jean-François Leroy (botanist) =

French botanist (1915–1999)

- Born: Jean François Pierre Leroy; 25 February 1915; Athis-de-l'Orne, Orne, France
- Died: 8 February 1999; Le Chesnay, Yvelines, France
- Education: University of Lyon, Muséum national d'histoire naturelle
- Known for: Tropical botany; flora of Madagascar
- Scientific career
- Fields: Botany
- Workplaces: Muséum national d'histoire naturelle
- Author abbrev. (botany): J.-F.Leroy

Jean-François Leroy (25 February 1915 – 8 February 1999) was a French botanist who specialised in tropical botany, particularly the flora of Madagascar, and served for many years at the Muséum national d'histoire naturelle in Paris.

== Biography ==
Jean-François Leroy was born in Athis-de-l'Orne, Normandy. His father, a schoolteacher, died one year after his birth, and Leroy spent his early childhood living with his grandmother, alongside his mother and sister. He completed his primary and secondary education in Flers.

Initially pursuing literary studies, Leroy obtained a degree in literature at the University of Lyon in 1938. On the advice of Auguste Chevalier, a distant relative and prominent botanist, he shifted toward botany and joined the Laboratory of Tropical Agronomy at the Muséum national d'histoire naturelle, directed by Chevalier.

At the Muséum, Leroy successively served as assistant, deputy director from 1948, and later professor without chair in 1965. He earned a degree in natural sciences in 1944, completed his doctorate in sciences in 1954, and from 1969 to 1982 held the chair of phanerogamy.

Continuing Chevalier's work on tropical flora, Leroy focused particularly on Madagascar, using its plant diversity as a foundation for studies related to evolutionary theory and the origin of flowering plants.

Jean-François Leroy died on 8 February 1999 in Le Chesnay at the age of 83.

== Selected works ==
- Charles Darwin et la théorie moderne de l'évolution (1966)
- Flore du Gabon (1985)
- Flore de Madagascar (1991)
- Origine et évolution des plantes à fleurs : les Nymphéas et le génie de la nature (1993)
