= Le Vey =

- Commune
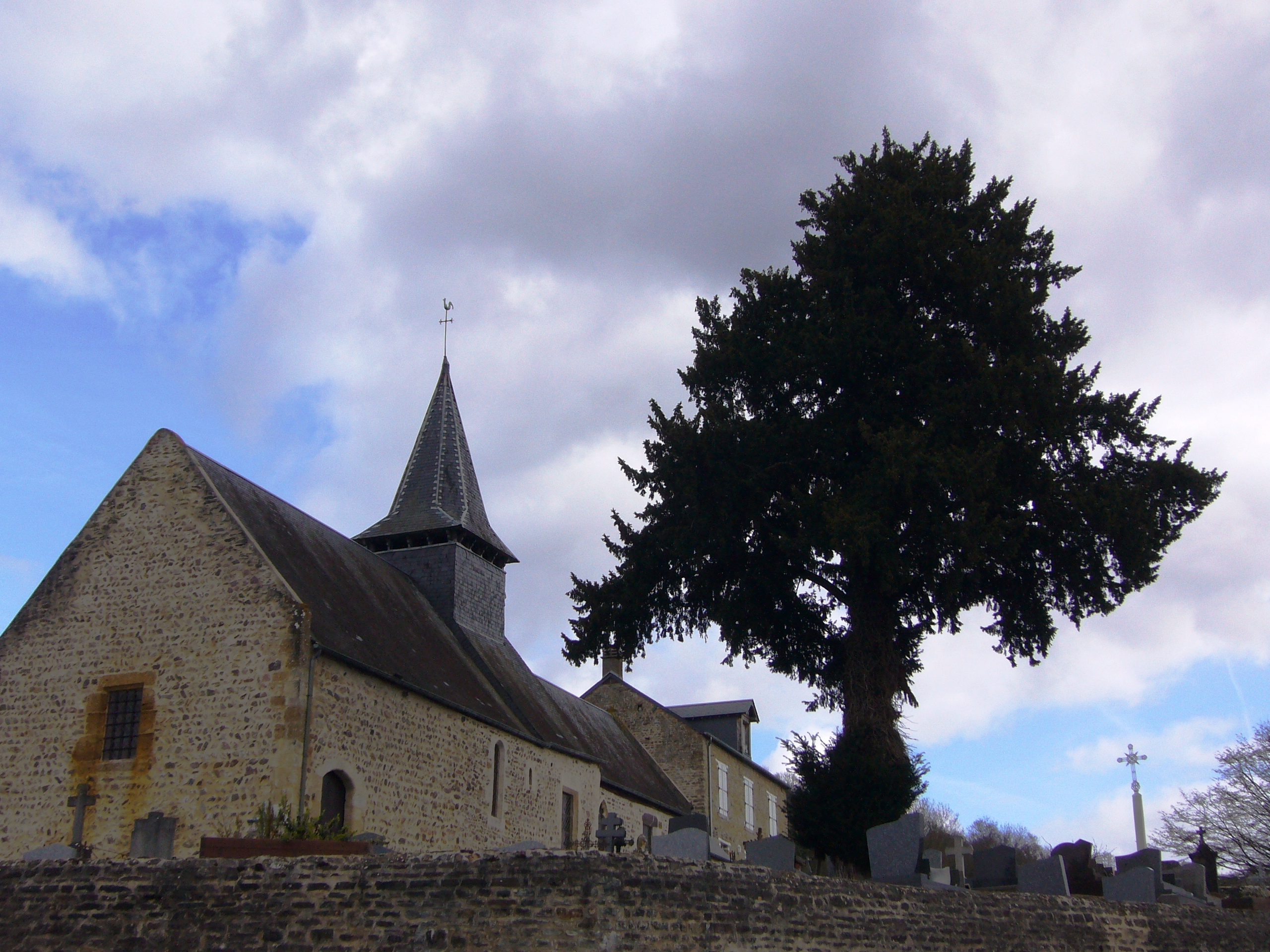
- The church in Le Vey
- Location of Le Vey
- Location within France Location within Normandy
- Coordinates: 48°55′04″N 0°28′10″W
- Country: France
- Region: Normandy
- Department: Calvados
- Arrondissement: Caen
- Canton: Le Hom
- Intercommunality: Cingal-Suisse Normande

Government
  - Mayor (2020–2026): Pierre Brisset
- Area^{1}: 3.53 km^{2} (1.36 sq mi)
- Elevation: 260 m (850 ft)
- Highest elevation: 264 m (866 ft)
- Lowest elevation: 32 m (105 ft)
- Population (2023): 139
  - Density: 39.4/km^{2} (102/sq mi)
- Time zone: UTC+01:00 (CET)
  - Summer (DST): UTC+02:00 (CEST)
- INSEE/Postal code: 14741 /14570
- ^{1} French Land Register data, which excludes lakes, ponds, glaciers > 1 km^{2} (0.386 sq mi or 247 acres) and river estuaries.

Le Vey (French pronunciation: [lə vɛ]) is a commune in the Calvados department in the Normandy region in northwestern France.

== Geography ==
The commune is part of the area known as Suisse Normande.

The commune is made up of the following collection of villages and hamlets, Sourdeval, Le Haut du Vey and Le Vey.

The Commune with another 20 communes shares part of a 2,115 hectare, Natura 2000 conservation area, called the Vallée de l'Orne et ses affluents.

The river Orne is the only watercourse that flows through the commune.

== Population ==
Historical population
Year	Pop.	±% p.a.
1968	104	—
1975	96	−1.14%
1982	88	−1.24%
1990	66	−3.53%
1999	71	+0.81%
2007	84	+2.12%
2012	103	+4.16%
2017	117	+2.58%
2023	139	+2.91%
Source: INSEE

== Points of Interest ==
- Rocher des Parcs is a 1400 Hectare nature reserve in the commune. The nature reserve features a 90 metre rockface, which is the sixth most visited place in France for climbers.

== See also ==
- Communes of the Calvados department
