= Beauvain =

- Commune
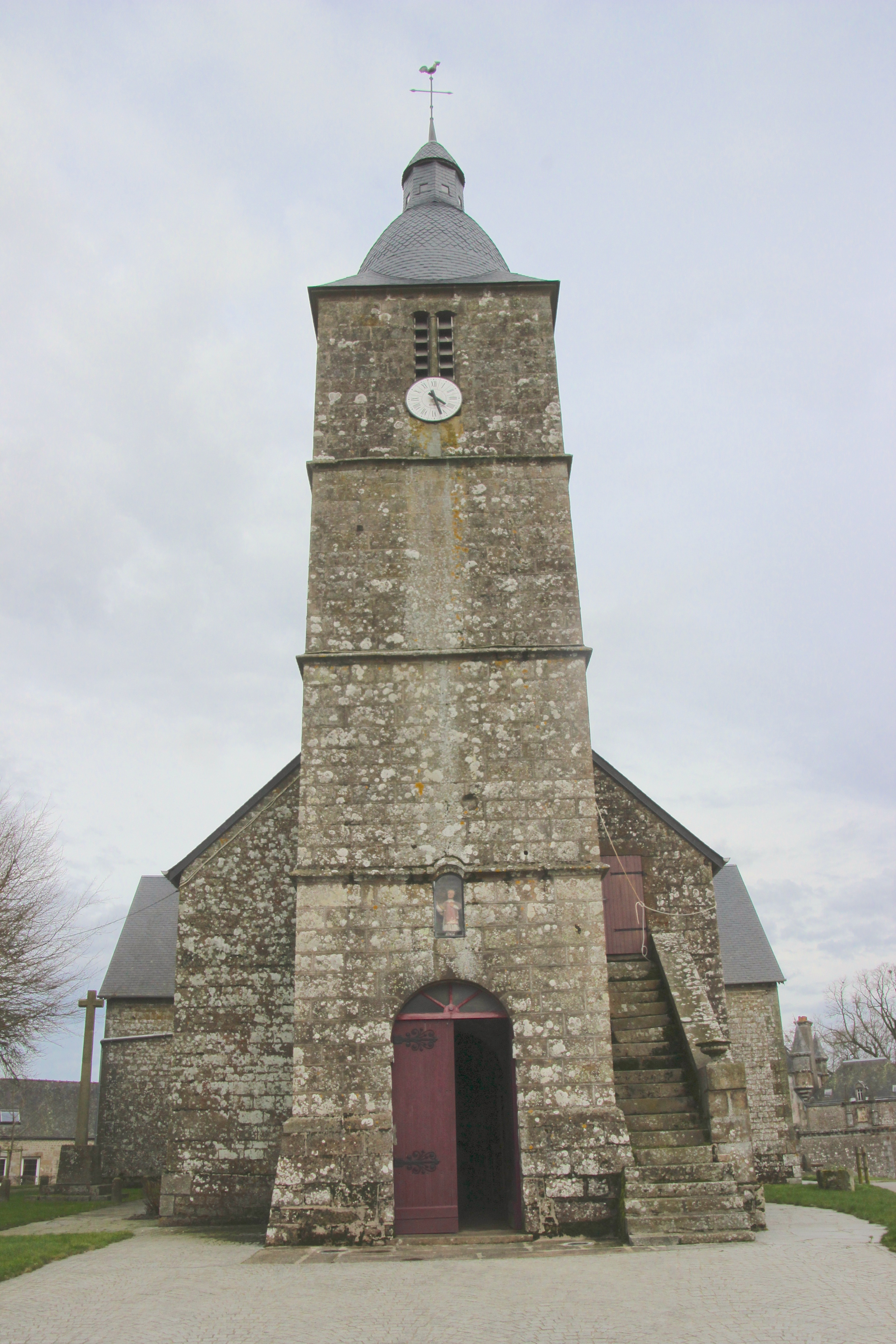
- The church in Beauvain
- Location of Beauvain
- Location within France Location within Normandy
- Coordinates: 48°36′29″N 0°18′23″W
- Country: France
- Region: Normandy
- Department: Orne
- Arrondissement: Alençon
- Canton: La Ferté-Macé

Government
  - Mayor (2020–2026): Eugène Châtel
- Area^{1}: 12.46 km^{2} (4.81 sq mi)
- Elevation: 282 m (925 ft)
- Highest elevation: 291 m (955 ft)
- Lowest elevation: 214 m (702 ft)
- Population (2023): 258
  - Density: 20.7/km^{2} (53.6/sq mi)
- Time zone: UTC+01:00 (CET)
  - Summer (DST): UTC+02:00 (CEST)
- INSEE/Postal code: 61035 /61600
- ^{1} French Land Register data, which excludes lakes, ponds, glaciers > 1 km^{2} (0.386 sq mi or 247 acres) and river estuaries.

Beauvain (French pronunciation: [bovɛ̃]) is a commune in the Orne department in northwestern France.

== Geography ==
It is 21,250 hectares (82.0 sq mi) in size. The highest point in the commune is 275 metres (902 ft).

The commune is within the Normandie-Maine Regional Natural Park.

The commune has one river, the Rouvre flowing through its borders, plus five streams, the Masses, the Beaudouit, the Moulinet, the Bois Tesselin and La Petitiere. The source of the river Rouvre is within this commune.

== Population ==
Historical population
Year	Pop.	±% p.a.
1968	240	—
1975	212	−1.76%
1982	177	−2.54%
1990	166	−0.80%
1999	253	+4.79%
2007	277	+1.14%
2012	269	−0.58%
2017	271	+0.15%
2023	258	−0.82%
Source: INSEE

== See also ==
- Communes of the Orne department
- Parc naturel régional Normandie-Maine
