= Rock of Oëtre =

Mountain in Normandy, France

Roche d'Oëtre
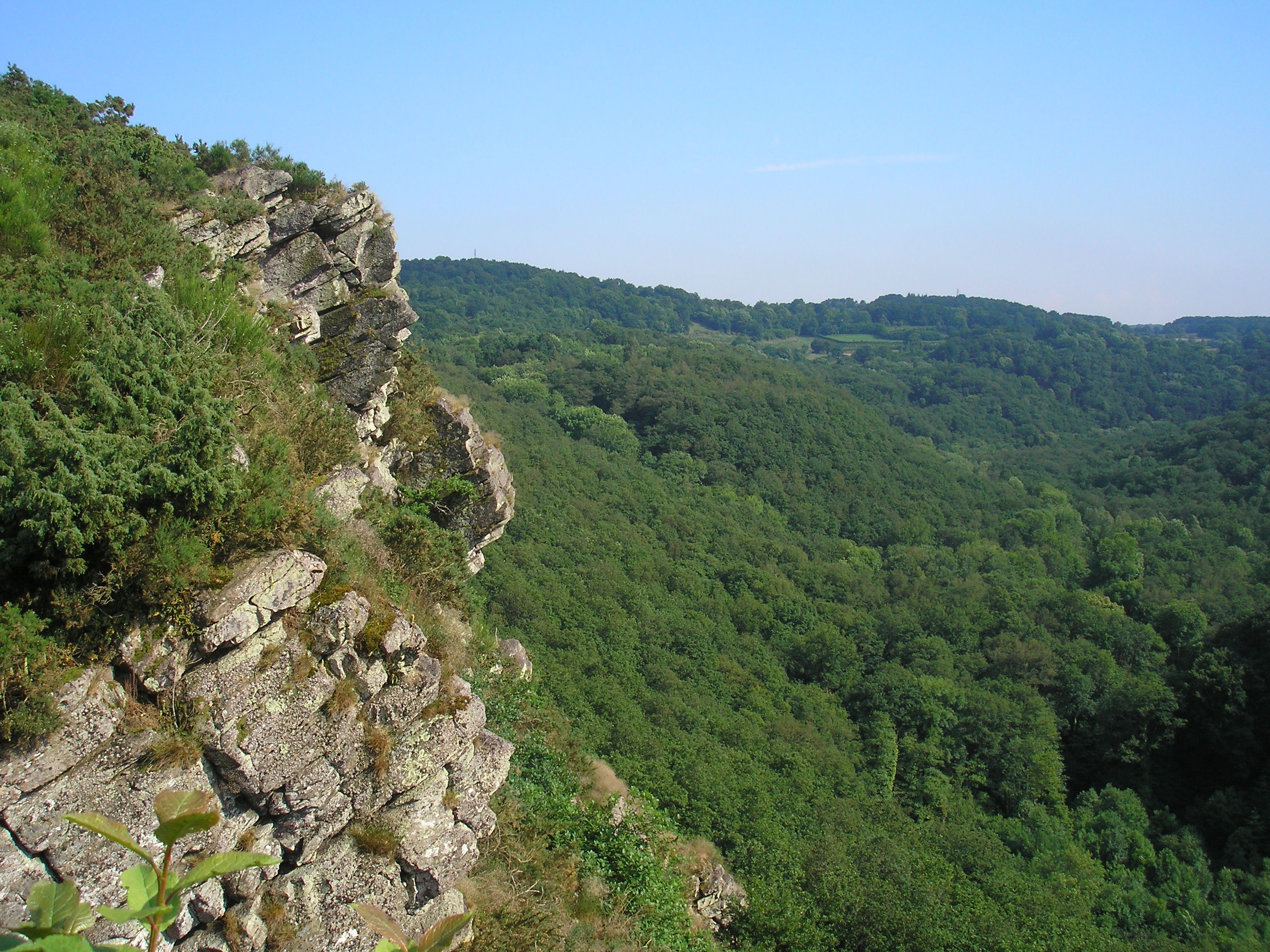

Highest point
- Prominence: 118 m (387 ft)
- Coordinates: 48°49′43″N 0°22′54″W

Naming
- English translation: Rock of Oëtre
- Language of name: French

Geography
- Location within France Location within Normandy
- Location: Orne, France
- Parent range: Armorican Massif

Geology
- Rock age: Cambrian
- Mountain type: Metamorphic rock

The Rock of Oëtre (French: Roche d'Oëtre pronounced [rɔʃ dwatʁ]) is situated in the middle of Norman Switzerland, in the commune of Saint-Philbert-sur-Orne, not far from the border between the départements of Calvados and Orne, and almost equidistant from Thury-Harcourt and Écouché. It is one of the most popular lookouts in the west of France.

== Geology ==
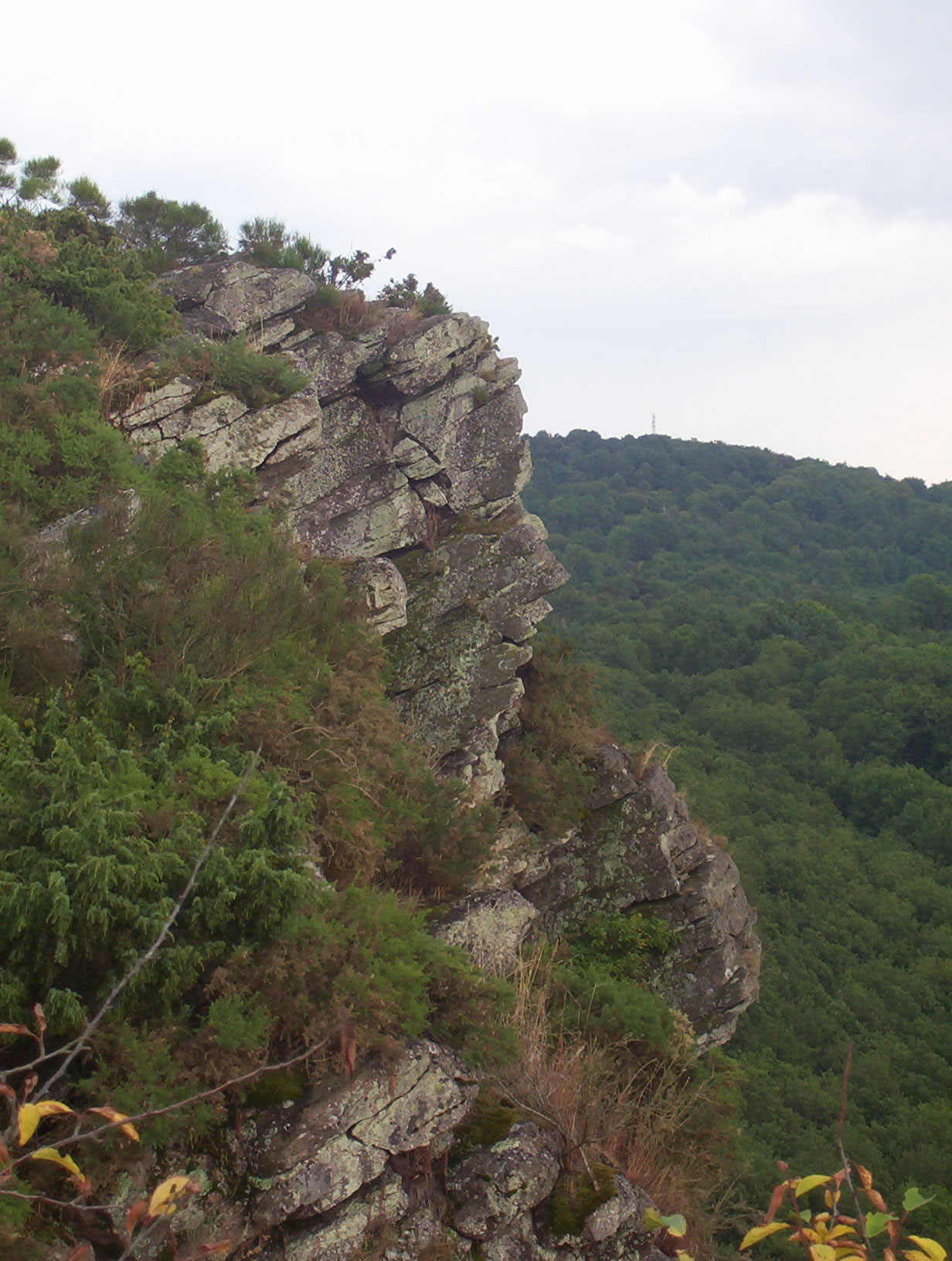
The Rock of Oëtre with its rocks resembling the profile of a human face

The precipice's sheer drop is 118 metres (387 ft). It is considered the most mountainous part of the region, even though not the highest, and it has become, over time, one of the main attractions in Normandy. It is also a lookout that gives a broad survey of the wooded groves of the Rouvre, which can be reached by steps hewn from the rock. The natural surroundings comprise of granite rocks, ravines, heath and thicket.

On arriving at the summit of the Rock, facing the precipice, one must advance 15 metres (49 ft) or 20 metres (66 ft), to see, on the left, the peculiar feature of the site: the resemblance of a human face in profile. This figure has been characterised as being many different people. The surrounding area served as a natural hiding place for outlaws of all kinds: the "Fairy's Cave" was one of the most secure hiding places for Chouans and highwaymen.

The rock shows that the Basse-Normandie region is Armorican, at least in its western half. The Armorican Massif does not stop at the border with Brittany, the neighbouring region, but extends to the department of Manche, south-west of Calvados and west of Orne. Norman Switzerland is at the eastern end of the Armorican Massif, with the Rock at its centre.

== Natural history ==
Due to the environmental awareness of the Orne département, the Rock of Oëtre harbours numerous species of plants and animals rare in France: the spring spergula or spurrey (small white flower), the European green lizard and many species of lichen. These are very prone to being trampled, so visitors should keep to the marked trails.

== Museum ==
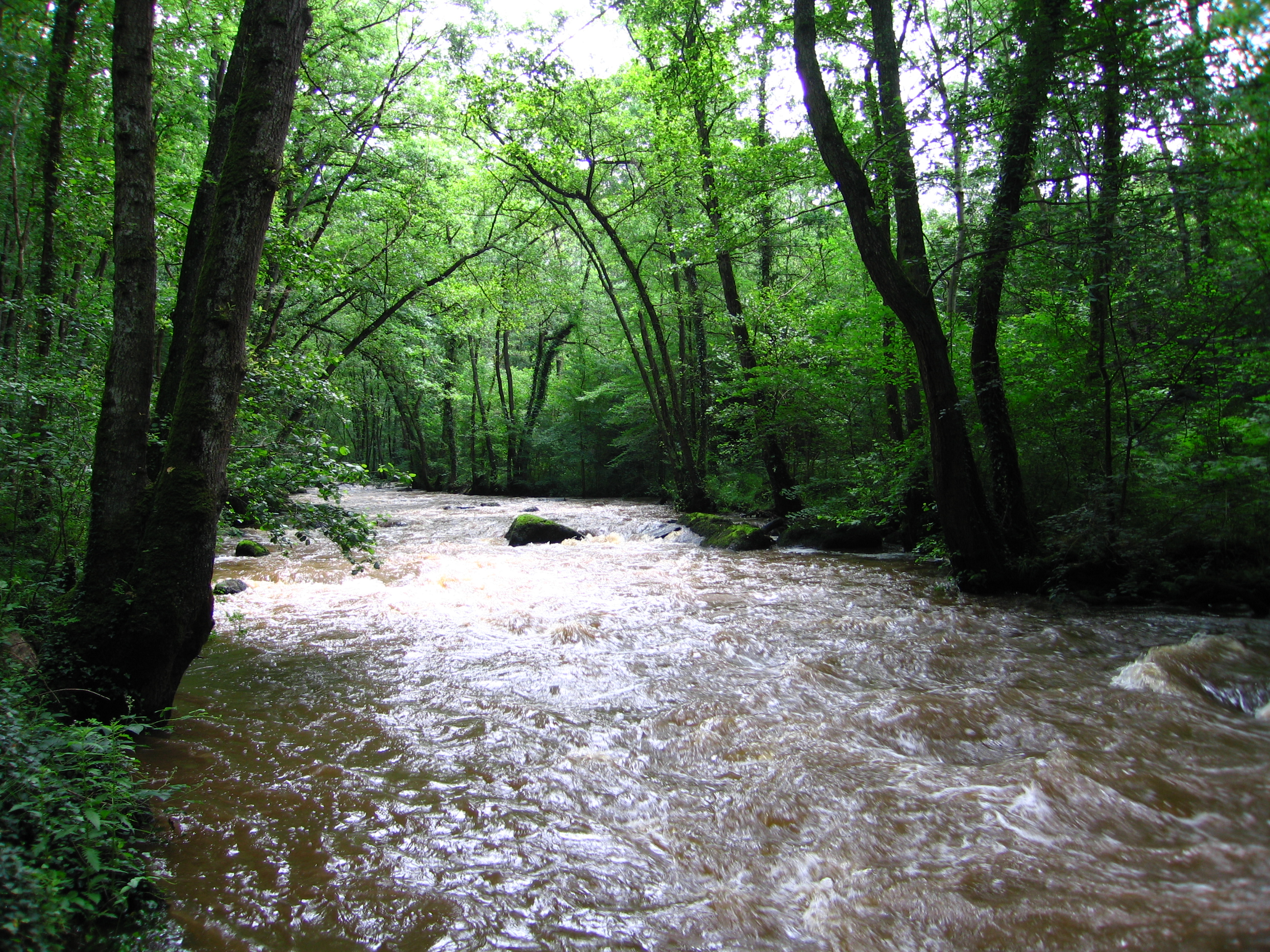
The Rouvre at the bottom of the Rock of Oëtre

At the site's summit, around 35 metres (115 ft) from the edge, a new wooden pavilion was opened in May 2006. It offers visitors regional tourist information, a museum, library and shop, and a bar-restaurant. Visitors can learn of the long geological history of the oldest mountains in Europe, the Armorican Massif, from how, two thousand million years ago, they were more than 5 kilometres (3.1 mi) above sea level, to their present 417 metres (1,368 ft).

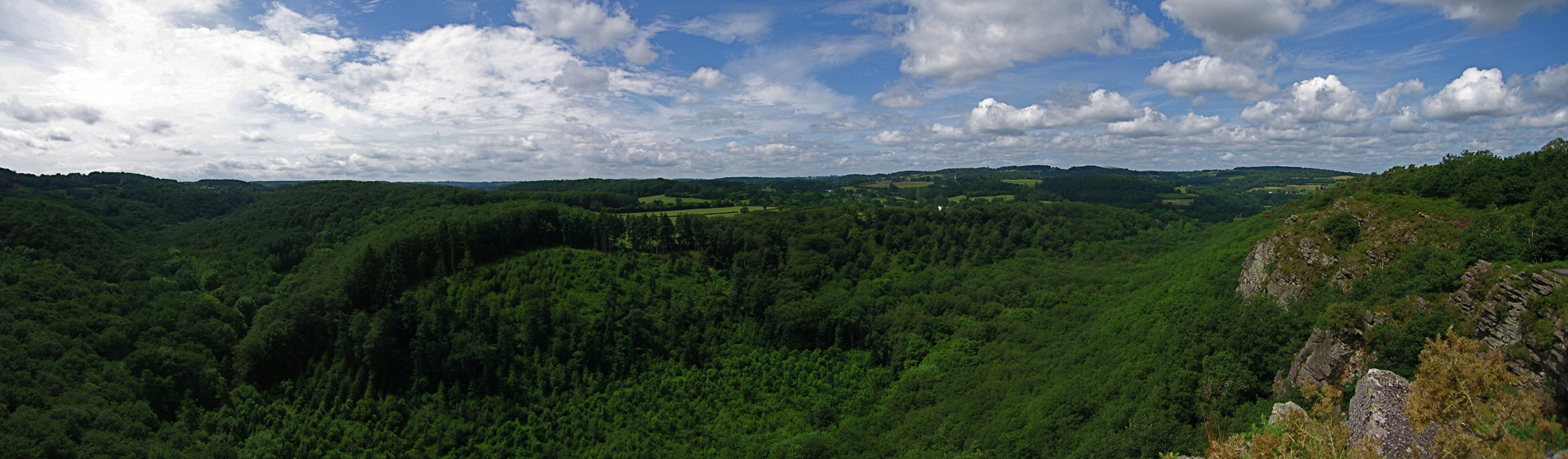
Panorama taken from the Rock of Oëtre
