= Putanges-Pont-Écrepin =

- Part of Putanges-le-Lac
- Location of Putanges-Pont-Écrepin
- Location within France Location within Normandy
- Coordinates: 48°45′52″N 0°14′45″W
- Country: France
- Region: Normandy
- Department: Orne
- Arrondissement: Argentan
- Canton: Athis-de-l'Orne
- Commune: Putanges-le-Lac
- Area^{1}: 10.12 km^{2} (3.91 sq mi)
- Elevation: 137 m (449 ft)
- Highest elevation: 241 m (791 ft)
- Lowest elevation: 121 m (397 ft)
- Population (2022): 980
  - Density: 97/km^{2} (250/sq mi)
- Time zone: UTC+01:00 (CET)
  - Summer (DST): UTC+02:00 (CEST)
- Postal code: 61210
- Website: www.ville-putanges.fr
- ^{1} French Land Register data, which excludes lakes, ponds, glaciers > 1 km^{2} (0.386 sq mi or 247 acres) and river estuaries.

Putanges-Pont-Écrepin (French pronunciation: [pytɑ̃ʒ pɔ̃.t‿ekʁəpɛ̃]) is a village and a former commune in the Orne département of north-western France. On 1 January 2016, it was merged into the new commune of Putanges-le-Lac.

The former commune is part of the area known as Suisse Normande.

== Heraldry ==
Arms of Putanges-Pont-Écrepin	The arms of Putanges-Pont-Écrepin are blazoned : Or, a lion vert, armed, langued and crowned argent, standing on a 3-arched bridge sable masoned argent, issuant from a base engrailed (river) azure.

== See also ==
- Communes of the Orne department
