= Rouvre =

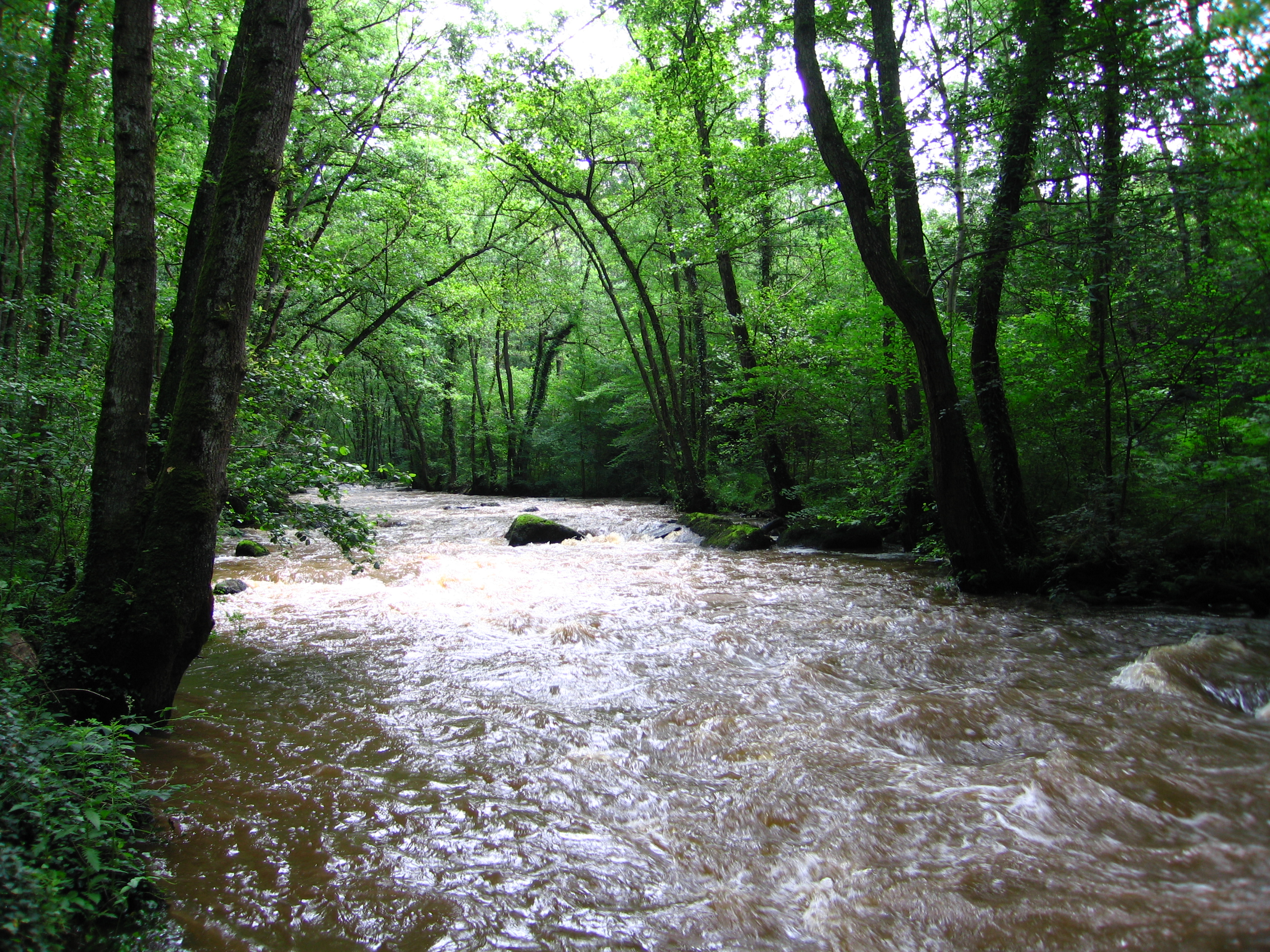
- The river in woodland

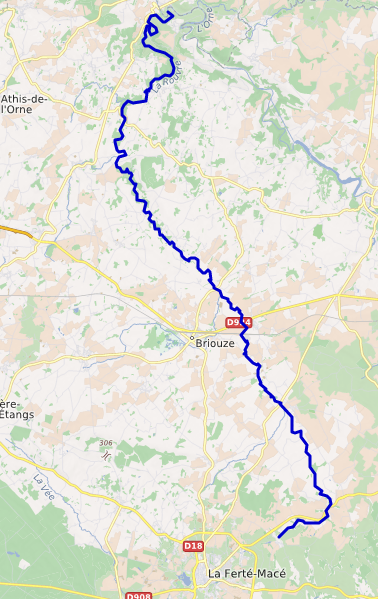

Location
- Country: France

Physical characteristics
- Source
  - location: Beauvain, Orne, Normandy
  - elevation: 316 m (1,037 ft)
- Mouth
  - location: Orne at Ménil-Hubert-sur-Orne
  - coordinates: 48°50′50″N 0°23′03″W
  - elevation: 63 m (207 ft)
- Length: 46 km (29 mi)
- Basin size: 309 km^{2} (119 sq mi)

Basin features
- Progression: Orne→ English Channel

The Rouvre (French pronunciation: [ʁuvʁ]) is a river in Normandy, in the Orne département, a tributary of the river Orne. It is 45.7 km (28.4 mi) long.

The river's source is in the commune of Beauvain, a few kilometres to the east of La Ferté-Macé. After crossing the Pays d'Houlme, it turns in a north-westerly direction to re-enter Norman Switzerland, and then in its last course of 15 km (9.3 mi) passes around Bréel.

The Rouvre then joins the Orne between the dam at Saint-Philbert-sur-Orne and Pont-d'Ouilly, at Rouvrou (elevation 63 m (207 ft)).

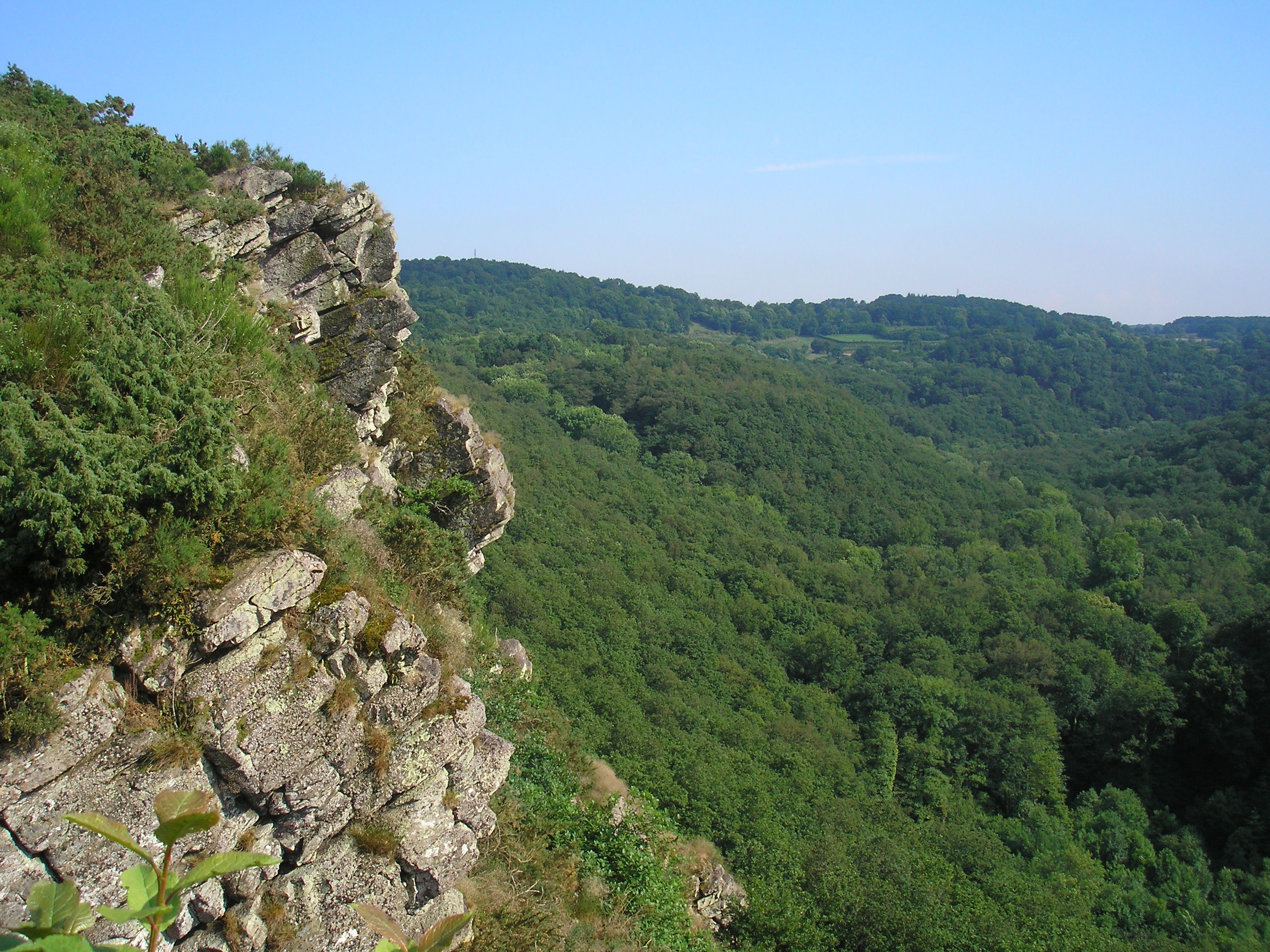
The Rock of Oëtre

This last part of its course is through small wooded gorges and its fast waters can make for good kayaking, when the water level permits, and fishing for brown trout. These gorges are home to animal and plant species such as pearl mussels and Osmond Royal (water-fern), and one may occasionally see otters and salmon.

The river's environment makes it an important tourist attraction in Norman Switzerland, with its rural and fluvial environment, The viewpoint from the Rock of Oetre into the valley is of 118 m (387 ft) below, the steepest drop.

Parts of the river are protected under the Natura 2000 conservation area called Vallée de l'Orne et ses affluents.
