= Saint-Philbert-sur-Orne =

- Commune
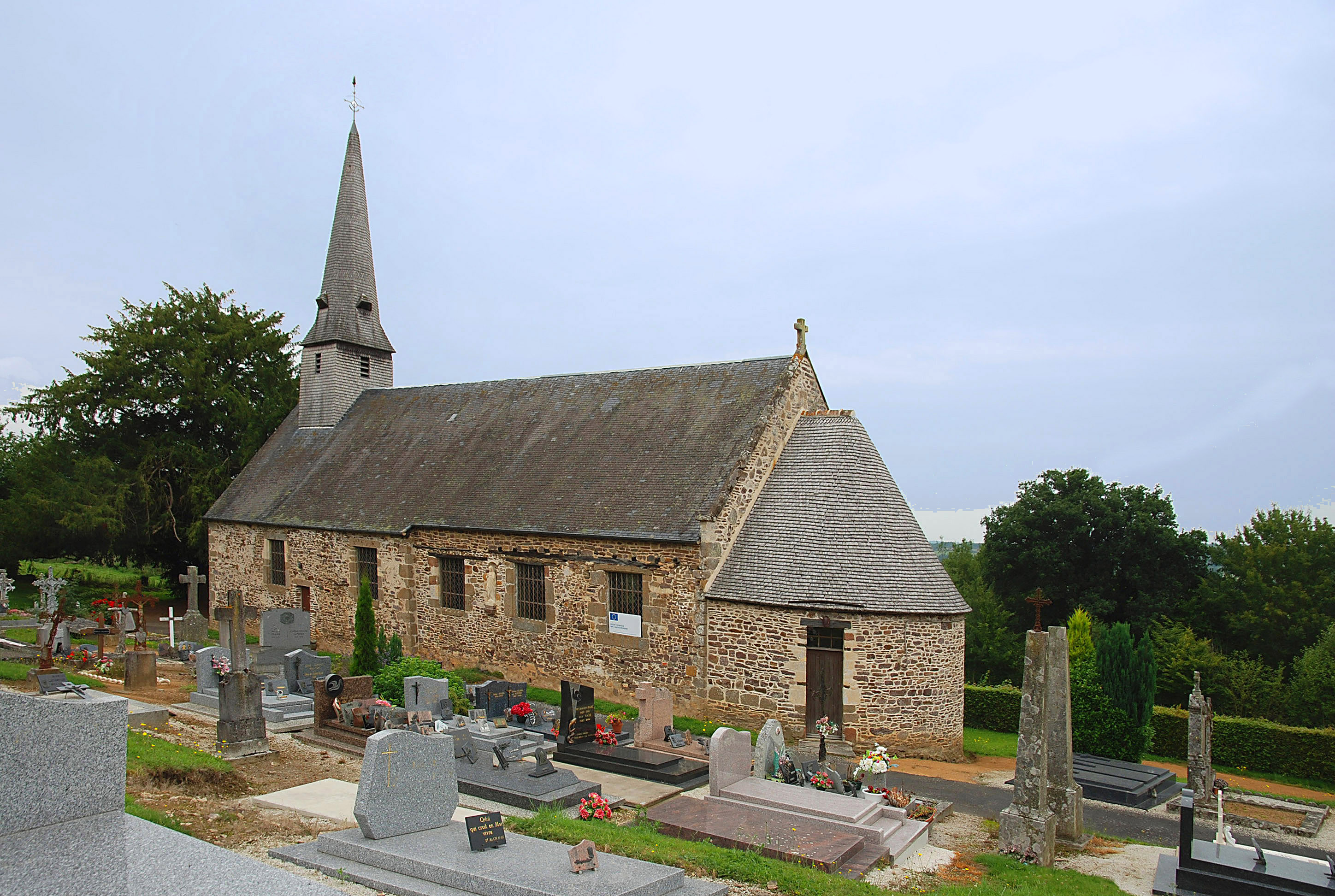
- The church in Saint-Philbert-sur-Orne
- Location of Saint-Philbert-sur-Orne
- Location within France Location within Normandy
- Coordinates: 48°50′27″N 0°22′40″W
- Country: France
- Region: Normandy
- Department: Orne
- Arrondissement: Argentan
- Canton: Athis-Val de Rouvre
- Intercommunality: CA Flers Agglo

Government
  - Mayor (2020–2026): Thierry Raux
- Area^{1}: 5.97 km^{2} (2.31 sq mi)
- Elevation: 160 m (520 ft)
- Highest elevation: 190 m (620 ft)
- Lowest elevation: 50 m (160 ft)
- Population (2023): 111
  - Density: 18.6/km^{2} (48.2/sq mi)
- Time zone: UTC+01:00 (CET)
  - Summer (DST): UTC+02:00 (CEST)
- INSEE/Postal code: 61444 /61430
- ^{1} French Land Register data, which excludes lakes, ponds, glaciers > 1 km^{2} (0.386 sq mi or 247 acres) and river estuaries.

Saint-Philbert-sur-Orne (French pronunciation: [sɛ̃ filbɛʁ syʁ ɔʁn], literally Saint-Philbert on Orne) is a commune in the Orne department in north-western France.

== Geography ==
The commune is part of the area known as Suisse Normande.

The commune is made up of the following collection of villages and hamlets, La Vallée, Le Val, Le Haut Perron and Saint-Philbert-sur-Orne.

The Commune with another 20 communes shares part of a 2,115 hectare, Natura 2000 conservation area, called the Vallée de l'Orne et ses affluents.

The commune has 3 watercourses running through it, with 2 rivers the Orne plus one of its tributaries the Rouvre. The other watercourse is a stream called the Val Corbel Stream.

== Places of interest ==
- Rock of Oëtre is one of the most prestigious lookouts in the west of France.
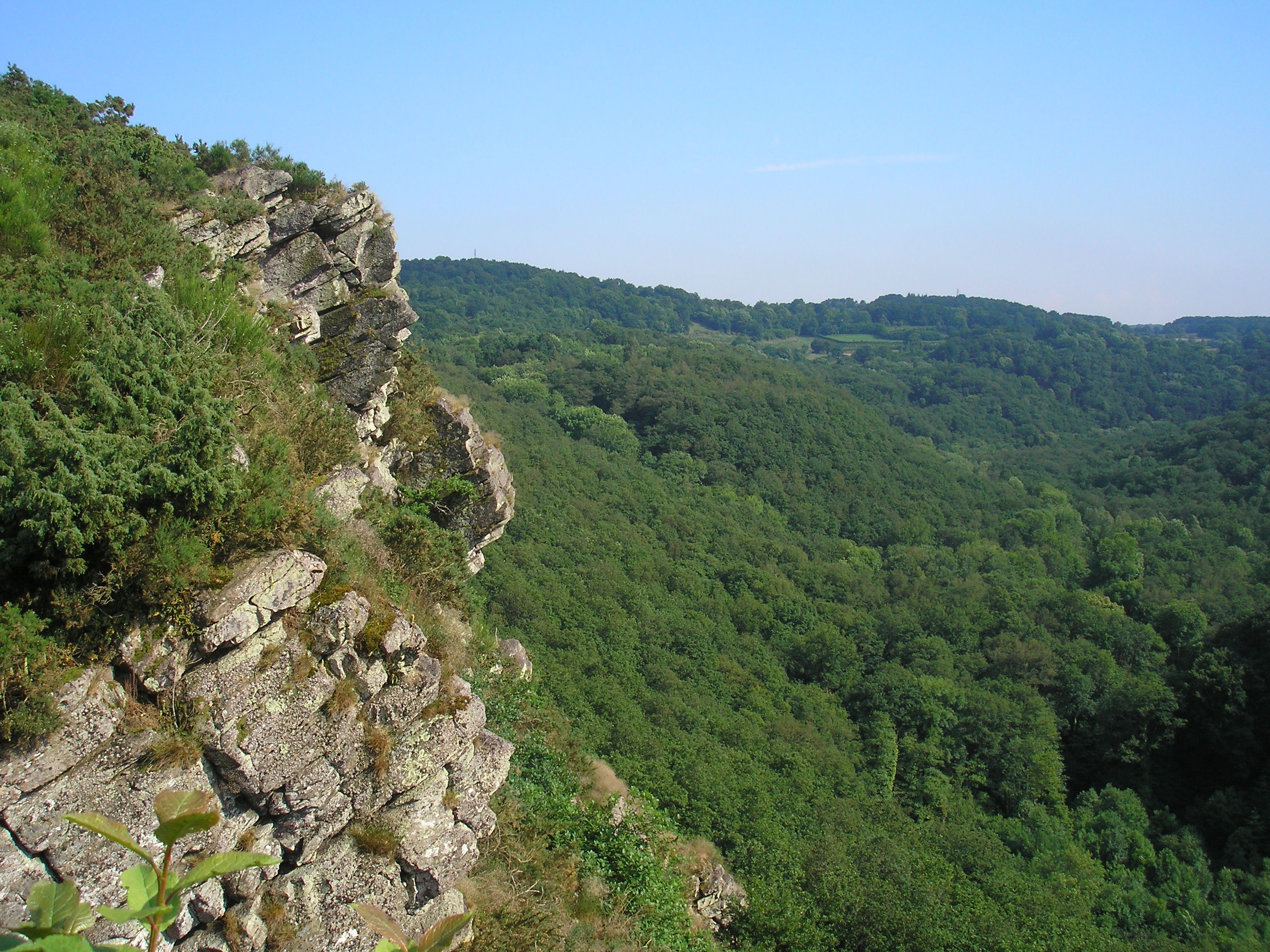
RocheD Oetre

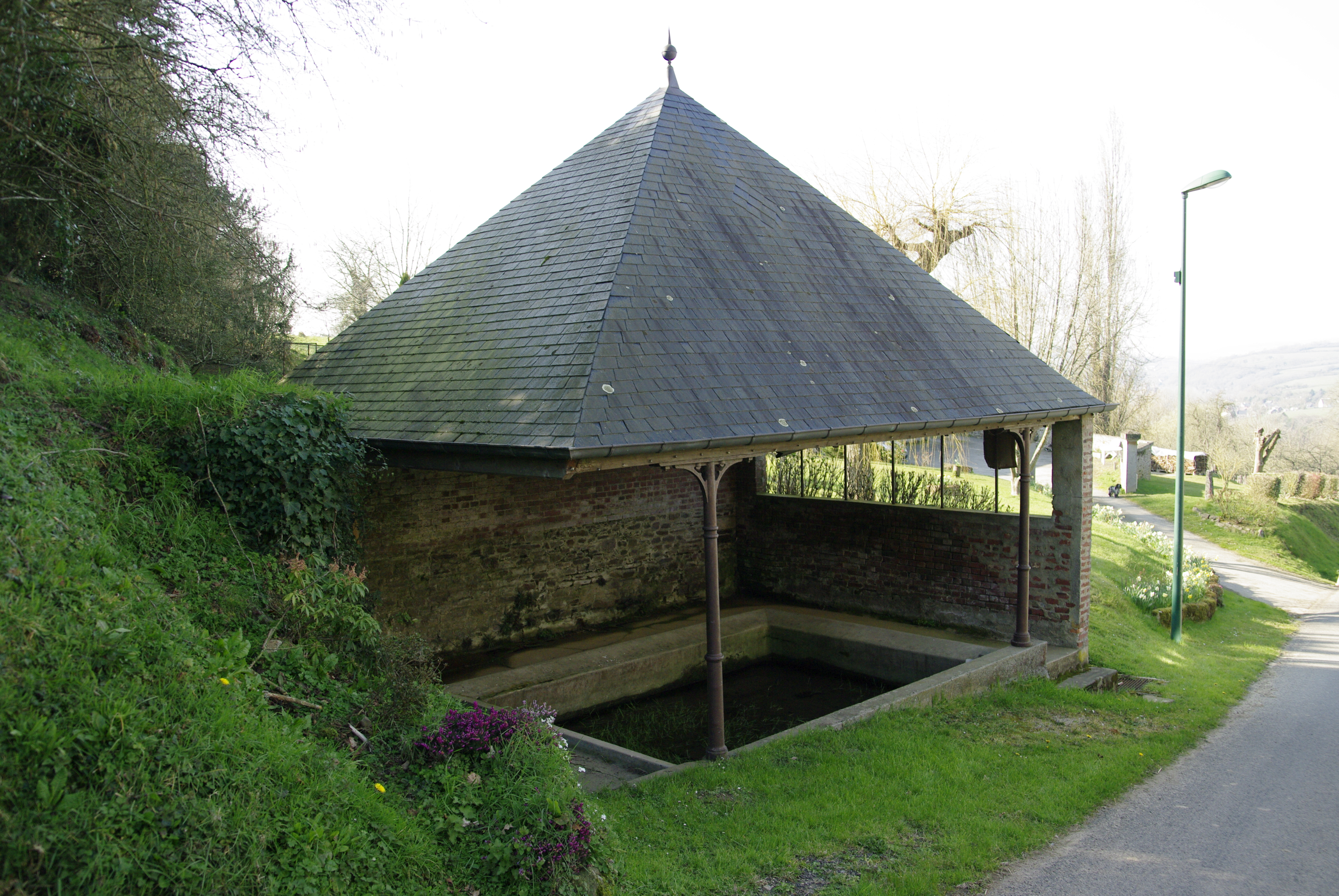
Saint-Philbert-sur-Orne Lavoir

== See also ==
- Communes of the Orne department
