= Saint-Omer, Calvados =

Saint-Omer
- Commune
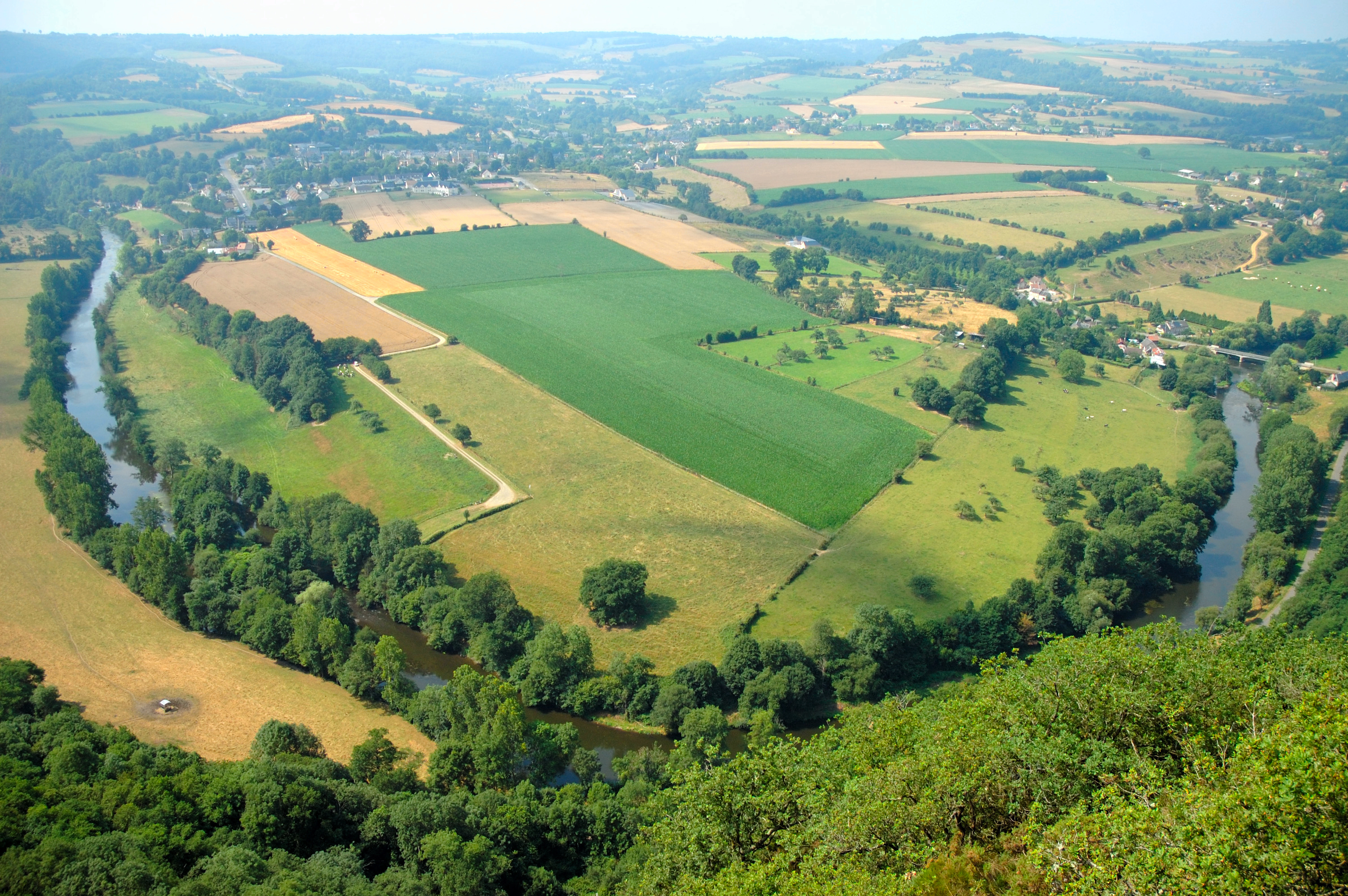
- A hillside view of Saint-Omer
- Location of Saint-Omer
- Location within France Location within Normandy
- Coordinates: 48°55′36″N 0°27′07″W
- Country: France
- Region: Normandy
- Department: Calvados
- Arrondissement: Caen
- Canton: Le Hom
- Intercommunality: Cingal-Suisse Normande

Government
  - Mayor (2020–2026): Claudine Courval
- Area^{1}: 8.07 km^{2} (3.12 sq mi)
- Elevation: 306 m (1,004 ft)
- Highest elevation: 306 m (1,004 ft)
- Lowest elevation: 90 m (300 ft)
- Population (2023): 191
  - Density: 23.7/km^{2} (61.3/sq mi)
- Time zone: UTC+01:00 (CET)
  - Summer (DST): UTC+02:00 (CEST)
- INSEE/Postal code: 14635 /14220
- ^{1} French Land Register data, which excludes lakes, ponds, glaciers > 1 km^{2} (0.386 sq mi or 247 acres) and river estuaries.

Saint-Omer (French pronunciation: [sɛ̃t‿omɛʁ]) is a commune in the Calvados department in the Normandy region in northwestern France.

== Geography ==
The commune is part of the area known as Suisse Normande.

The commune is made up of the following collection of villages and hamlets, Le Mesnil, L'Abbaye du Val, Le Moncel, La Fortinière, Les Hautes Planches, Courteil and Saint-Omer.

The Commune with another 20 communes shares part of a 2,115 hectare, Natura 2000 conservation area, called the Vallée de l'Orne et ses affluents.

The two streams of La Vallee des Vaux and The Orival are the only watercourses running through the commune.

== Population ==
Historical population
Year	Pop.	±% p.a.
1968	182	—
1975	184	+0.16%
1982	162	−1.80%
1990	142	−1.63%
1999	157	+1.12%
2007	162	+0.39%
2012	174	+1.44%
2017	184	+1.12%
2023	191	+0.62%
Source: INSEE

== Points of Interest ==
Les Rochers de La Houle is the remains of an ancient mountain range, the Armorican Massif that was gradually eroded by the sea, the remaining 240 metre high fragment is a popular destination for tourists.

=== National heritage sites ===
Mégalithe du Pré-du-Vivret is a Neolithic Megalith that was classed as a Monument historique in 1954

== See also ==
- Communes of the Calvados department
