= Ménil-Gondouin =

- Commune
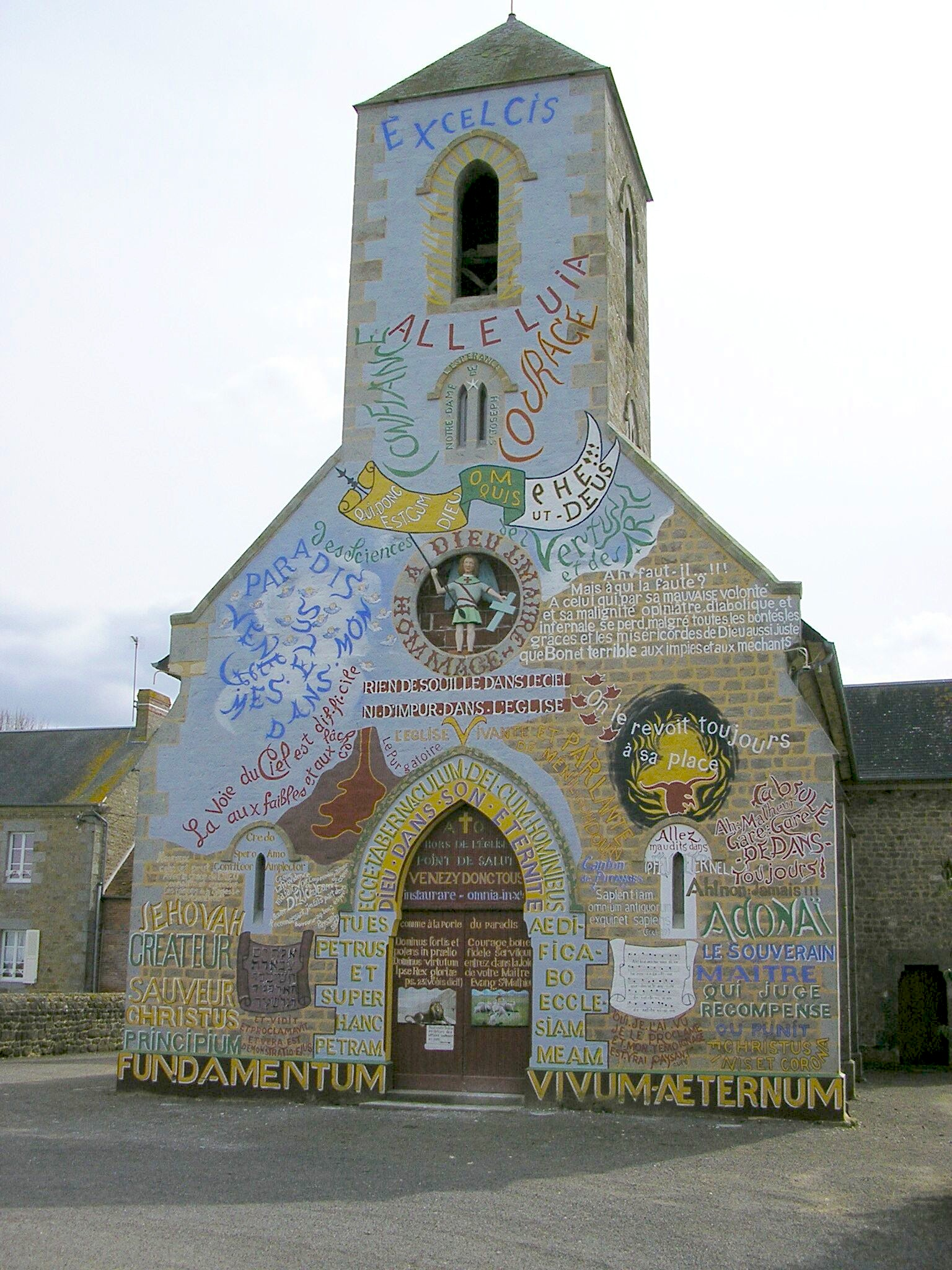
- The church in Ménil-Gondouin
- Location of Ménil-Gondouin
- Location within France Location within Normandy
- Coordinates: 48°45′19″N 0°17′33″W
- Country: France
- Region: Normandy
- Department: Orne
- Arrondissement: Argentan
- Canton: Athis-Val de Rouvre
- Intercommunality: Val d'Orne

Government
  - Mayor (2020–2026): Pascal Bouquerel
- Area^{1}: 9.17 km^{2} (3.54 sq mi)
- Elevation: 229 m (751 ft)
- Highest elevation: 254 m (833 ft)
- Lowest elevation: 157 m (515 ft)
- Population (2023): 156
  - Density: 17.0/km^{2} (44.1/sq mi)
- Time zone: UTC+01:00 (CET)
  - Summer (DST): UTC+02:00 (CEST)
- INSEE/Postal code: 61265 /61210
- ^{1} French Land Register data, which excludes lakes, ponds, glaciers > 1 km^{2} (0.386 sq mi or 247 acres) and river estuaries.

Ménil-Gondouin (French pronunciation: [menil ɡɔ̃dwɛ̃]) is a commune in the Orne department in north-western France.

== Geography ==
The commune is made up of the following collection of villages and hamlets, La Coconière, La Haute Bruyèreand Ménil-Gondouin.

The commune is part of area known as Suisse Normande.

Menil-Gondouin only has one watercourse running through it, the Ruisseau de Vienne.

== Notable buildings and places ==
=== The living and talking church of Ménil-Gondouin ===
Saint-Vigor du Ménil-Gondouin church is a nineteenth century church that has been covered in statues and dozens of inscriptions by a single person, the parish priest Victor Paysant (1841-1921).

The church contains the head of a statue, of the Crowned Virgin, that is dating back to the 14th/15th Century and was listed as a Monument historique in 1984.

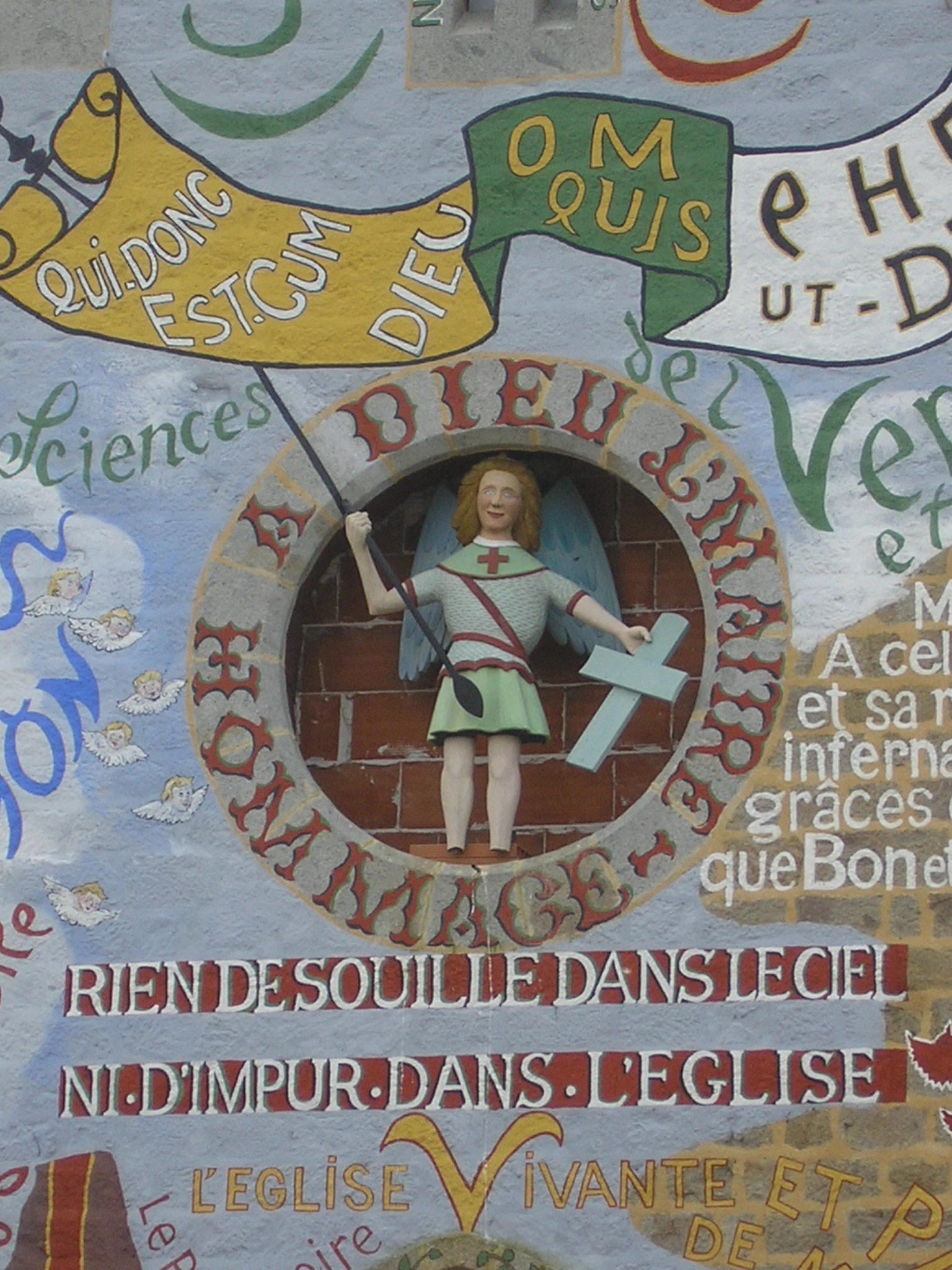
One of the statues of the Church

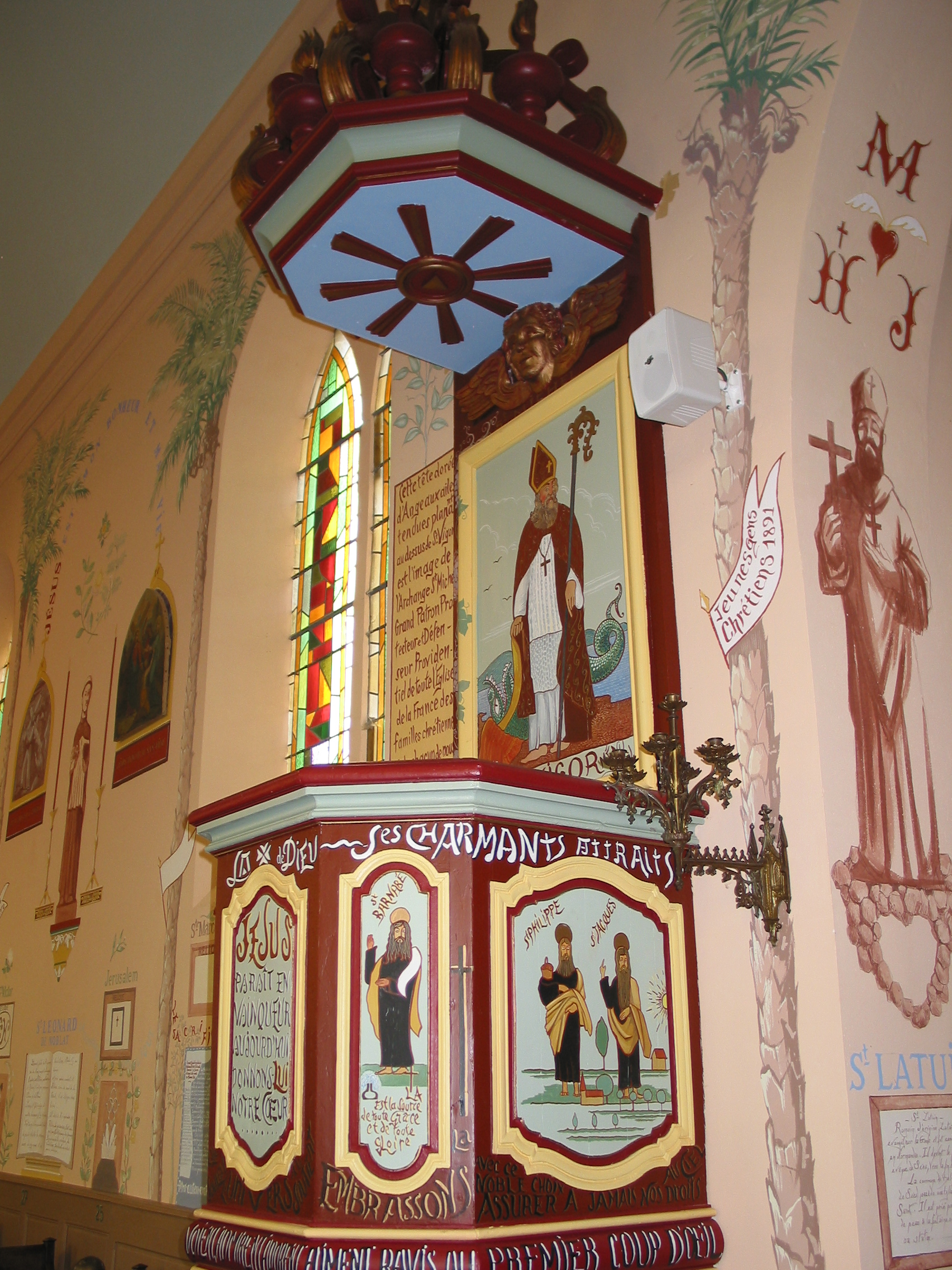
Churches Pulpit

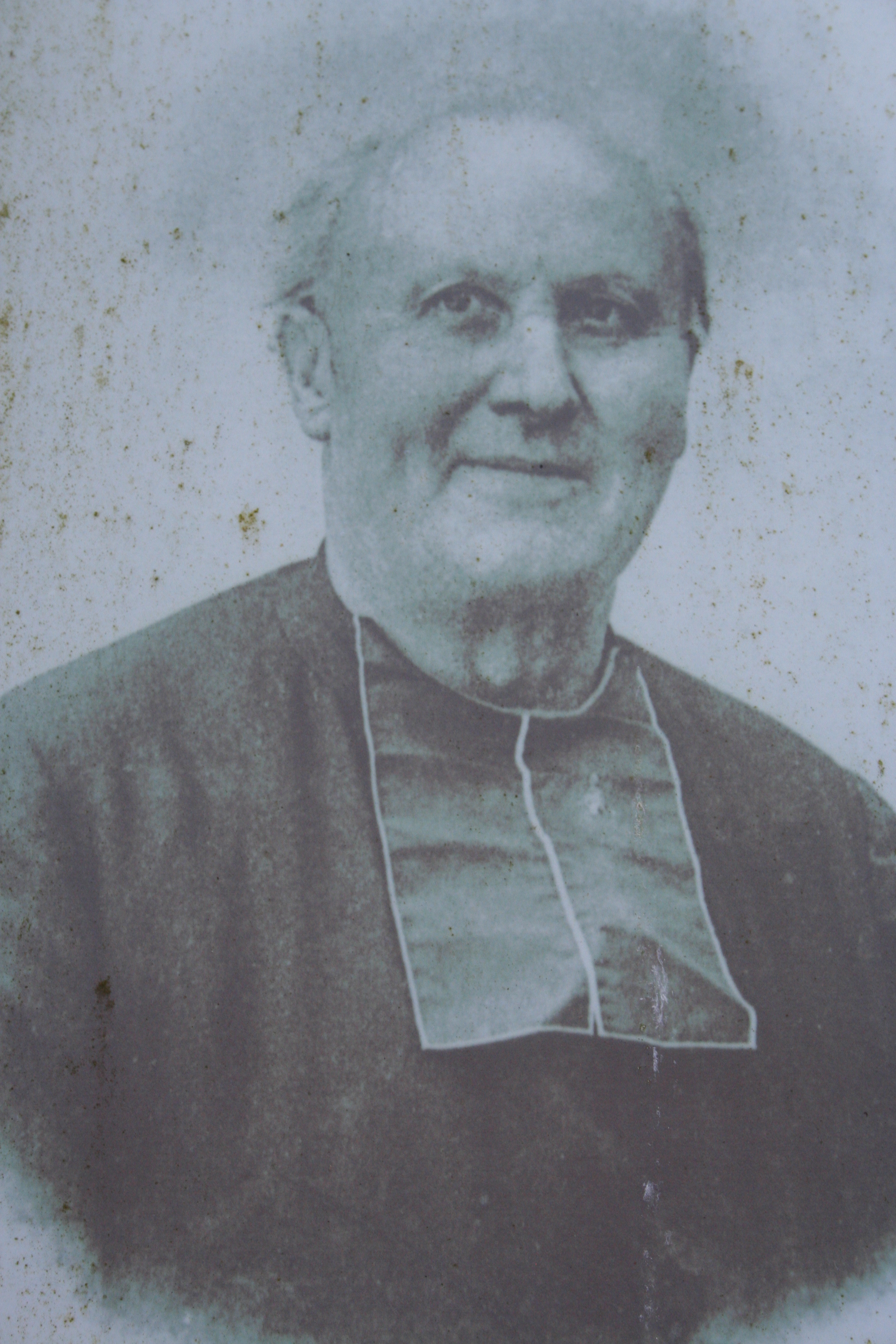
Victor Paysant

=== National heritage sites ===
The Commune has 2 other buildings and areas listed as a Monument historique

- Domain of the Court a set of remains of an old 16th century Chateau that belonged to Antoine de Turgot, that was listed as a Monument historique in 1983.
- Logis Saint-Honorine an 18th Century chateau with outbuildings dating back to the 15th century, listed as Monument Historique in 1975

== See also ==
- Communes of the Orne department
