= Athis-de-l'Orne =

- Part of Athis-Val-de-Rouvre
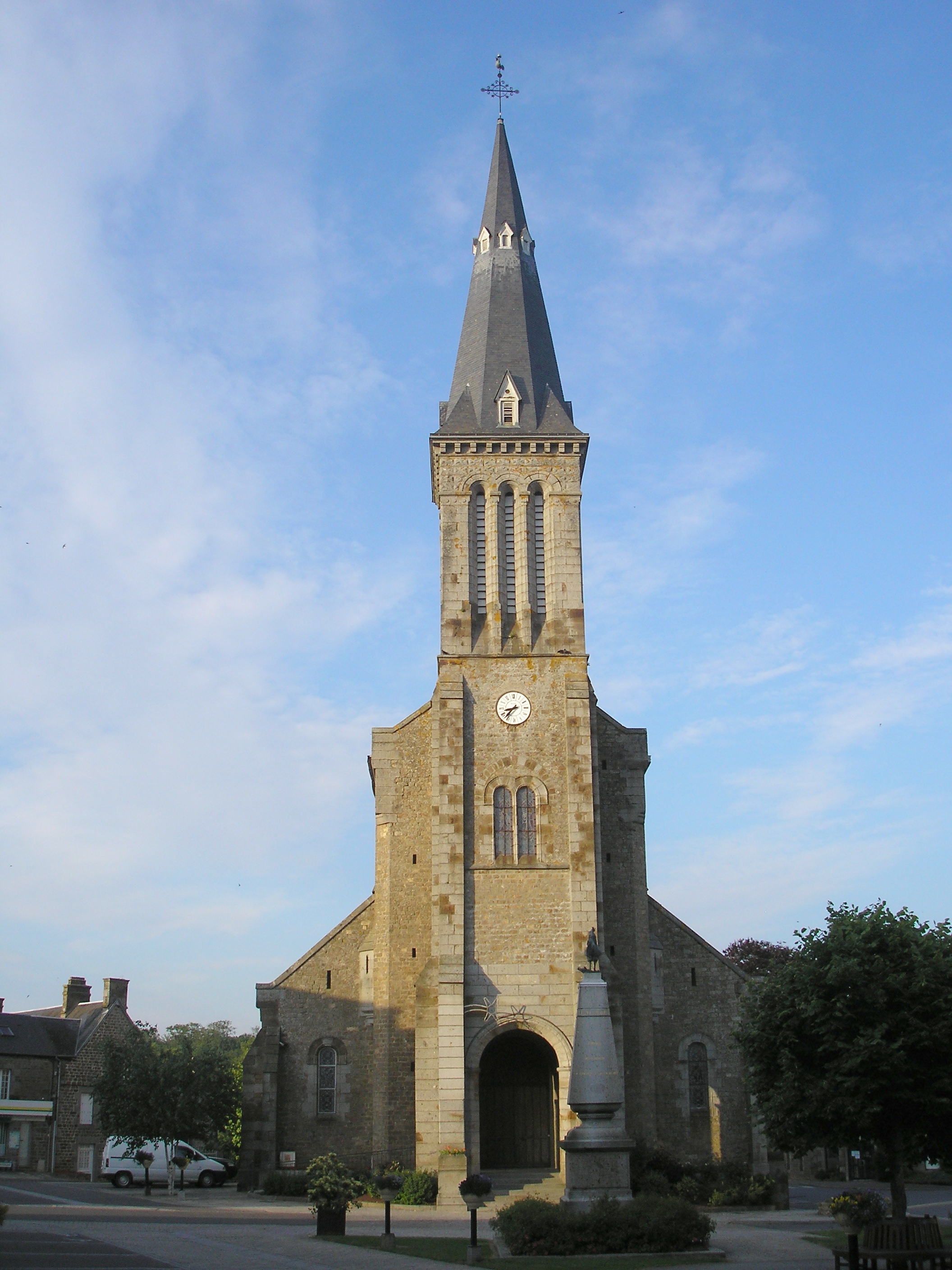

- Coat of arms
- Location of Athis-de-l'Orne
- Location within France Location within Normandy
- Coordinates: 48°48′41″N 0°30′00″W
- Country: France
- Region: Normandy
- Department: Orne
- Arrondissement: Argentan
- Canton: Athis-de-l'Orne
- Commune: Athis-Val-de-Rouvre
- Area^{1}: 32.47 km^{2} (12.54 sq mi)
- Elevation: 231 m (758 ft)
- Highest elevation: 268 m (879 ft)
- Lowest elevation: 102 m (335 ft)
- Population (2022): 2,470
  - Density: 76.1/km^{2} (197/sq mi)
- Time zone: UTC+01:00 (CET)
  - Summer (DST): UTC+02:00 (CEST)
- Postal code: 61430
- ^{1} French Land Register data, which excludes lakes, ponds, glaciers > 1 km^{2} (0.386 sq mi or 247 acres) and river estuaries.

Athis-de-l'Orne is a former commune in the Orne department in northwestern France. On 1 January 2016, it was merged into the new commune of Athis-Val-de-Rouvre. The modifier "de l'Orne" was added to the name in 1968, to distinguish it from Athis in the departement of Marne and Athis-Mons in the departement of Essonne. The former commune is part of the area known as Suisse Normande.

The rivers Vère and Lembron run through it. The church of St. Vigor dates from the 19th century.

== Population ==
Historical population
Year	Pop.	±% p.a.
1962	2,047	—
1968	2,016	−0.25%
1975	2,202	+1.27%
1982	2,369	+1.05%
1990	2,395	+0.14%
1999	2,421	+0.12%
2013	2,564	+0.41%
2022	2,470	−0.41%
Source: EHESS and INSEE

== International relations ==
It has been twinned since 1980 with Bromyard in Herefordshire, England, and since 1986 with Schöppenstedt in Wolfenbüttel, Lower Saxony, Germany.

== Heraldry ==
Arms of Athis-de-l'Orne	The arms of Athis-de-l'Orne are blazoned : Argent, 2 chevrons between 3 ducks sable.

== See also ==
- Communes of the Orne department
