= The living and talking church of Ménil-Gondouin =

Church of Saint-Vigor
- Église Saint-Céneri de Saint-Céneri-le-Gérei
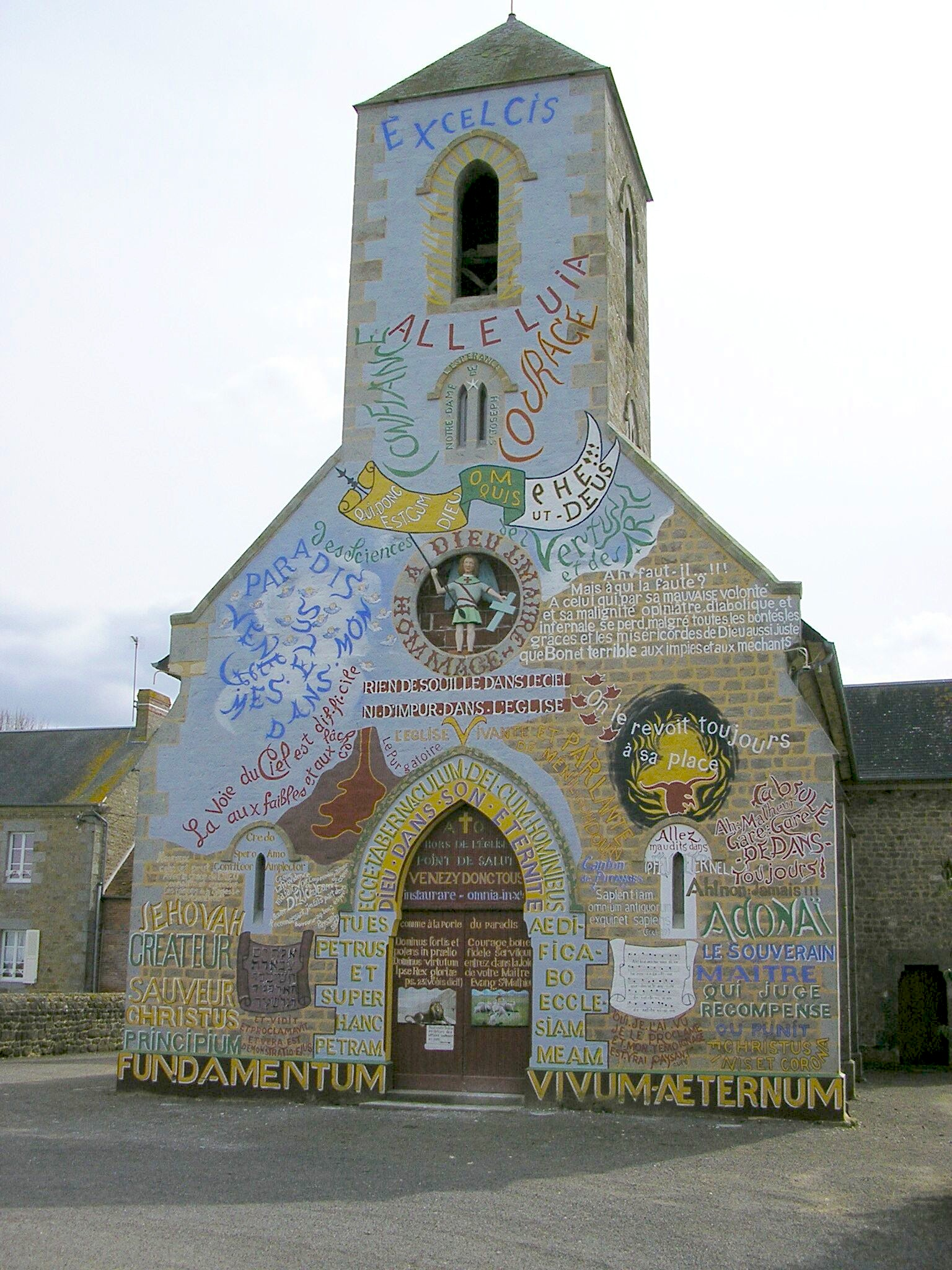
- The front of the church
- Church of Saint-Vigor
- 48.754363°N 0.292941°E
- Location: Ménil-Gondouin
- Country: France
- Denomination: Catholic

History
- Founded: 1870

Administration
- Diocese: Séez

Saint-Vigor du Ménil-Gondouin church is a nineteenth century church in Ménil-Gondouin, Orne department, that has been decorated under the direction of a single person, Victor Paysant who covered it in statues and dozens of inscriptions. The church is known as the Église Vivante et Parlante which translates as 'The living and talking church'

== History ==
=== Victor Paysant ===
The Church was built in 1870 under the initiative of Father Maillard to replace the original Village church under the episcopate of Monsignor Charles-Frédéric Rousselet.

In 1873 a new priest arrived, Victor Paysant. He saw the church was not yet fully constructed, and started to help finish construction, such as stopping the floor of the nave being used as a sewer for rainwater.

Inspired by his travels abroad he then decided to help decorate the church with murals and inscriptions, with the help of local painter Mr. Colombe. The priest decided that the paintings were required to explain religion to those who could not read, and when school became compulsory he added inscriptions. In addition to the paintings and inscriptions he added 72 statues, either recovered from the previous village churches, or made with some help from locval sculptor Mr. Petit, some of the sculptures were named after saints he had invented. The vicar also produced a collection of 180 postcards to showcase his work. He would carry on painting the walls, ceilings, floor and even the pews until his death in 1921.

=== Restoration ===
After his death the bishop ordered that the church be covered in whitewash and the statues buried. During the drought of 1976 the paintings started to reappear having been drawn out of the bricks by the heat and drought. In 2001 the local mayor, Guy Béchet, decided to raise funds to restore the church to how Victor Paysant left it. In 2004 work began on restoring the original work, and a local artist, Hugues Sineux was commissioned to restore the original murals. Using old photographs postcards, plus scrapings the artist started to create the pigments of the paint used, however it was only when a 99 years old resident saw the scale model and said the colors were wrong. With help from a local woman's grandchild she was able to recall from memory the original pigments used, which her grandchild then mixed and sent samples to the artists to allow him to restore the work to its original state. The restoration was finally was finally restored in 2006.

== Church Contents ==
The church contains the head of a statue, of the Crowned Virgin, that is dating back to the 14th/15th century and was listed as a Monument historique in 1984.

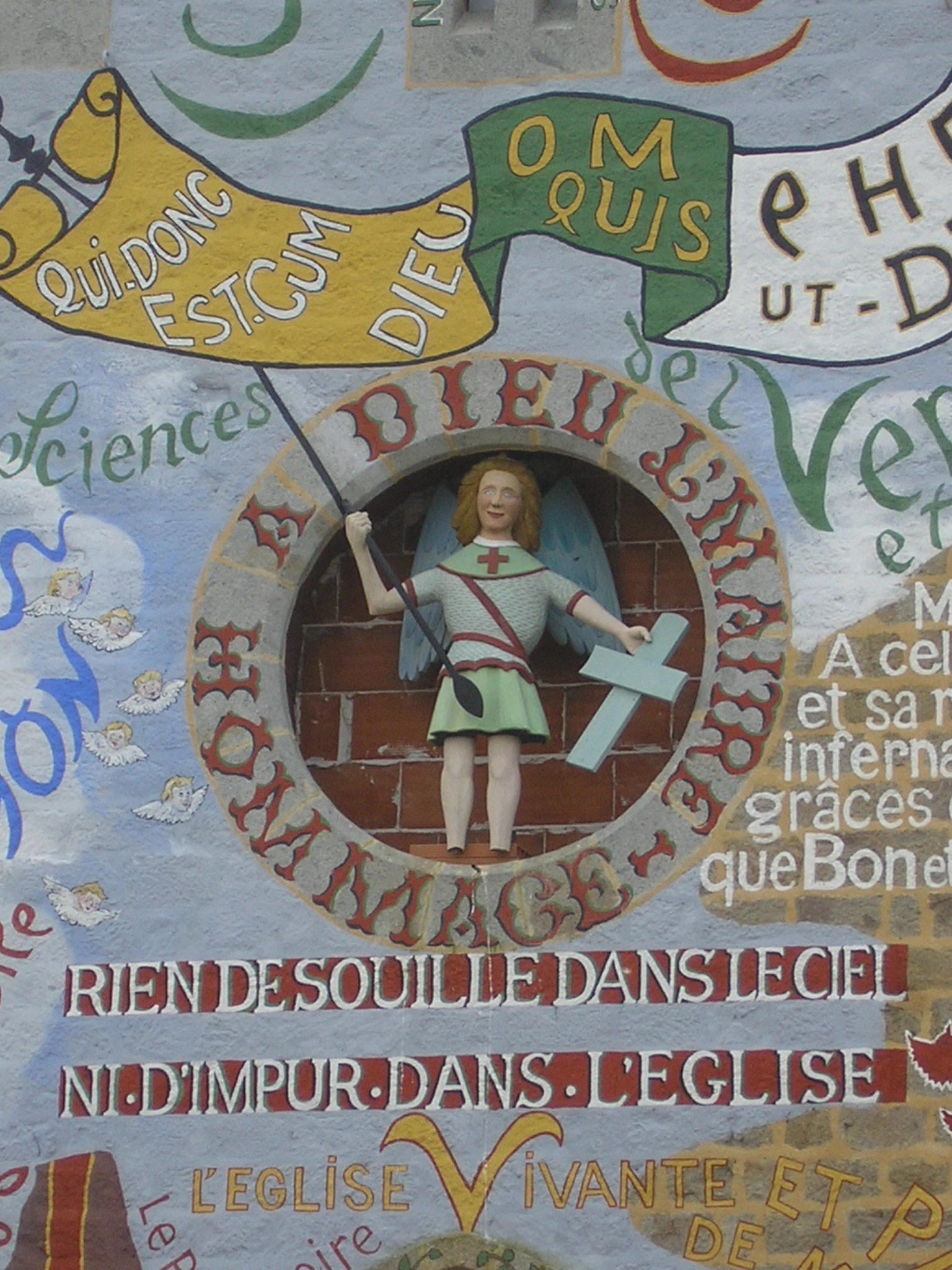
One of the statues of the Church

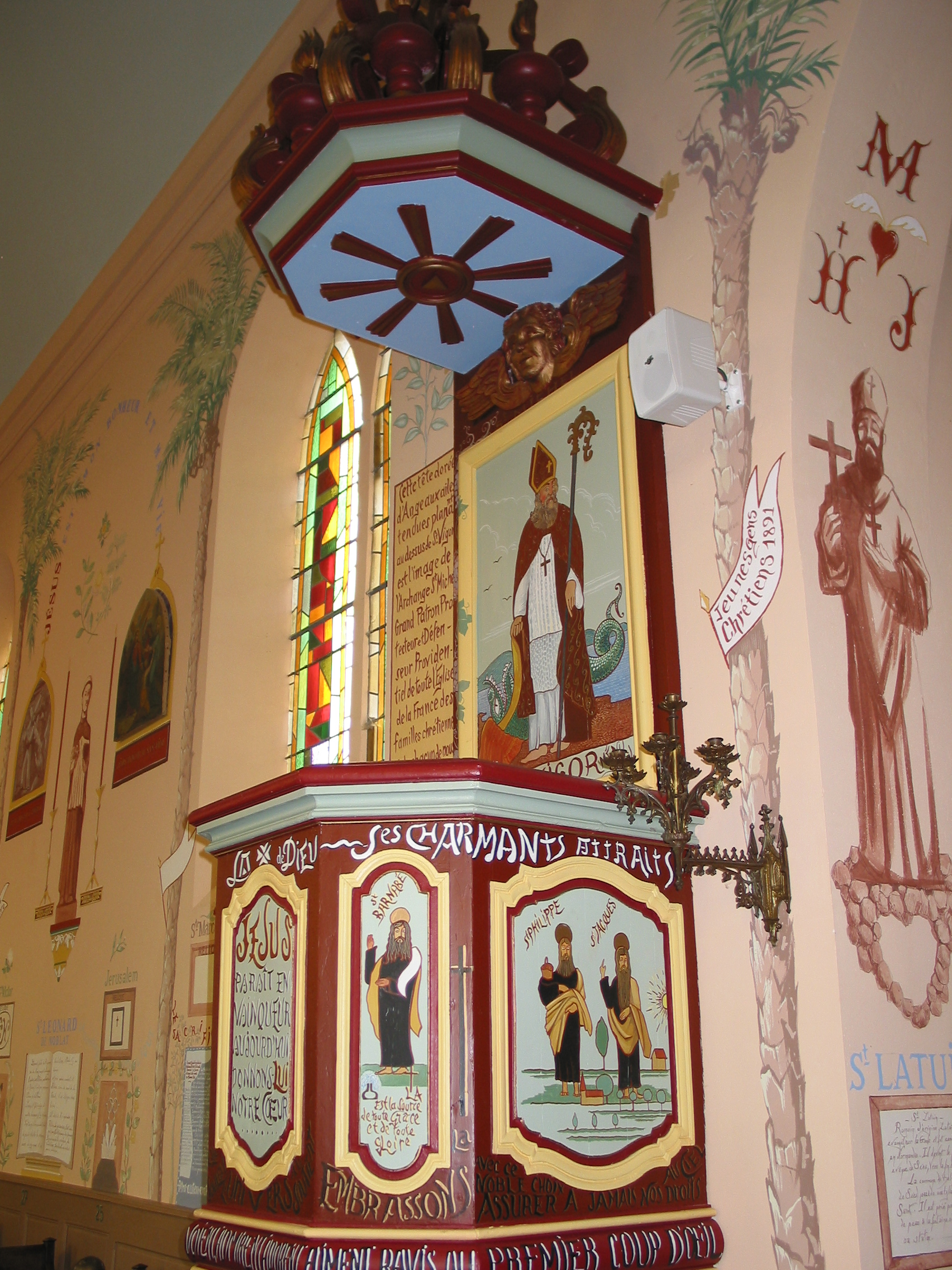
Churches Pulpit

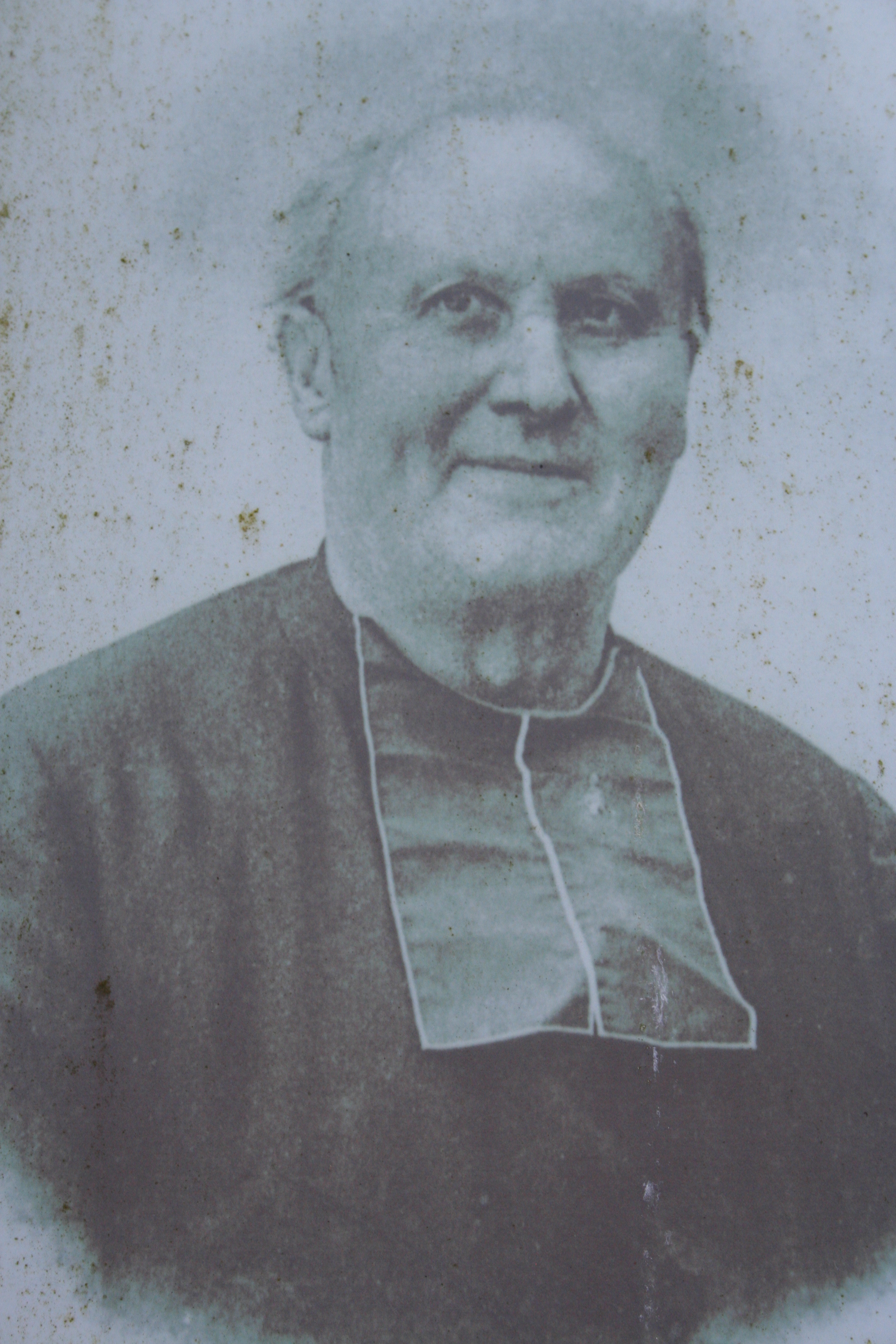
Victor Paysant
