= Putanges-le-Lac =

- Commune
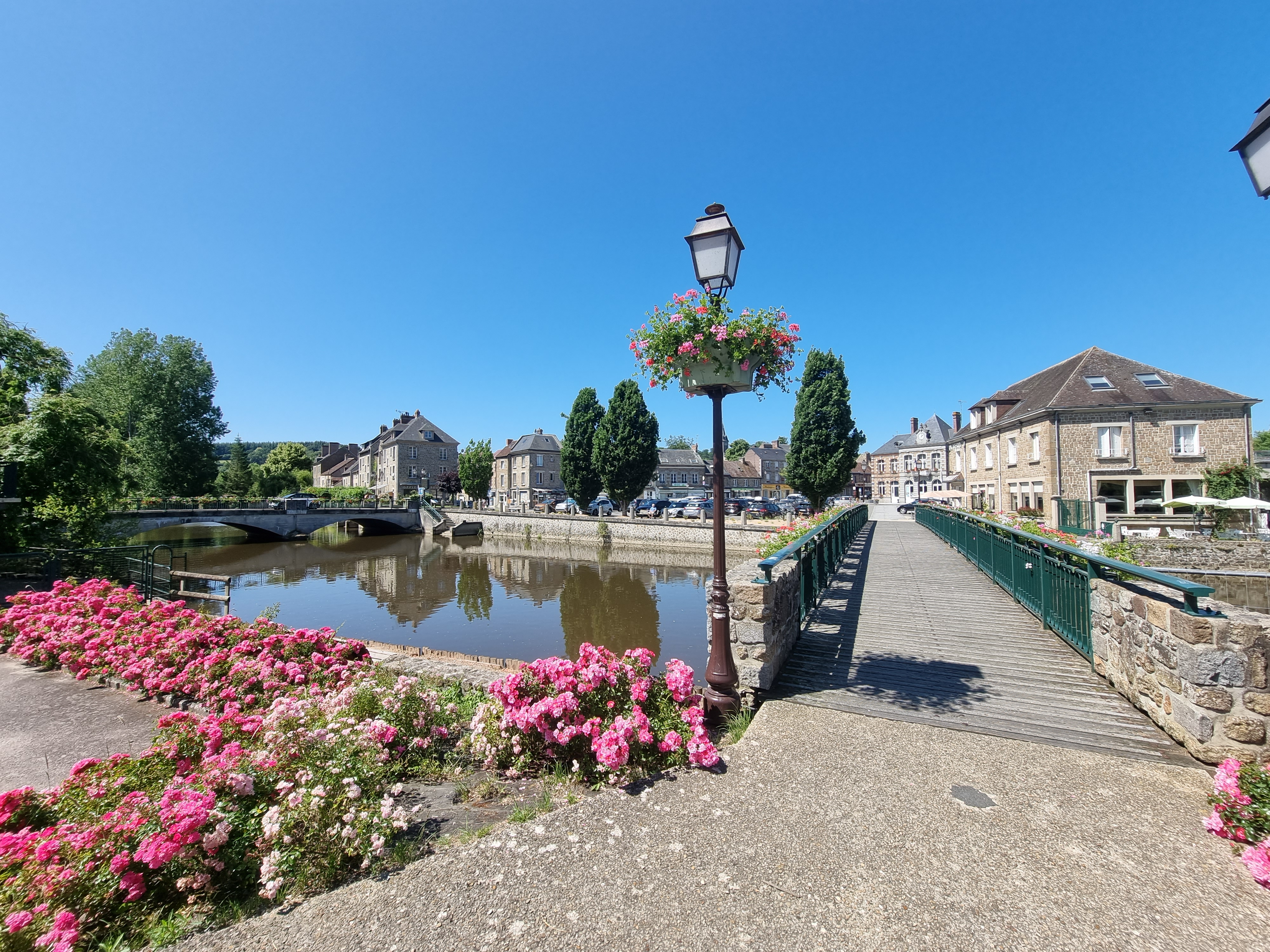
- Putanges centre from across the river
- Location of Putanges-le-Lac
- Location within France Location within Normandy
- Coordinates: 48°45′47″N 0°14′53″W
- Country: France
- Region: Normandy
- Department: Orne
- Arrondissement: Argentan
- Canton: Athis-Val de Rouvre
- Intercommunality: Val d'Orne

Government
  - Mayor (2020–2026): Sébastien Leroux
- Area^{1}: 76.91 km^{2} (29.70 sq mi)
- Population (2023): 2,093
  - Density: 27.21/km^{2} (70.48/sq mi)
- Time zone: UTC+01:00 (CET)
  - Summer (DST): UTC+02:00 (CEST)
- INSEE/Postal code: 61339 /61210
- ^{1} French Land Register data, which excludes lakes, ponds, glaciers > 1 km^{2} (0.386 sq mi or 247 acres) and river estuaries.

Putanges-le-Lac (French pronunciation: [pytɑ̃ʒ lə lak]) is a commune in the department of Orne, northwestern France. The municipality was established on 1 January 2016 by merger of the former communes of Chênedouit, La Forêt-Auvray, La Fresnaye-au-Sauvage, Ménil-Jean, Putanges-Pont-Écrepin (the seat), Rabodanges, Les Rotours, Saint-Aubert-sur-Orne and Sainte-Croix-sur-Orne.

== Geography ==
The commune is part of the area known as Suisse Normande.

The commune is made up of the following collection of villages and hamlets, Putanges-Pont-Écrepin,La Ferronnière, La Forêt-Auvray, Saint-Aubert-sur-Orne,Rabodanges,Les Rotours, Méguillaume, Chênedouit, Sainte-Croix-sur-Orne, La Fresnaye-au-Sauvage, Ménil-Jean and Fromentel.

Putanges-le-Lac along with another 65 communes shares part of a 20,593 hectare, Natura 2000 conservation area, called the Haute vallée de l'Orne et affluents. In addition the Commune with another 20 communes shares part of a 2,115 hectare, Natura 2000 conservation area, called the Vallée de l'Orne et ses affluents.

The river Orne runs through the commune, along with five streams which all drain into the Orne: Vienne, la Guesnerie, Gue Blandin, Monts Hiboux and Ruisseau des Vallees. There are two more streams the Maufy and La Coulandre which both feed into the Rouvre.

== History ==
There is evidence the area has been inhabited since Neolithic times with the Menhir dit la Droite Pierre in Chênedouit. All the villages with in the commune were first recorded during the Middle Ages, with the oldest seeming to be Saint-Aubert-sur-Orne created by the monks of Mont-Saint-Michel around 800AD.

The main town at the centre of the commune, Putanges-Pont-Écrepin, was originally two villages, separated by the Orne. Putanges was established in the 13th century, and was formed around ironworking. In 1756 an Artillery factory was built, that supplied cannons to the Ministry of the Navy. Pont-Écrepin developed on the right bank of the Orne, the town became an active commercial center, notably thanks to the leather and weaving industry.

The creation of the Forge lock made it possible to build a bridge over the orne connecting the two villages. In 1786 the Forge was transformed into a mill. In 1900, the Forge mill became an electricity-generating plant. The towns of Putanges and Pont-Écrépin were then the first in the Orne region to be lit by electricity.

=== World War 2 ===
When the Allied forces landed in 1944 as part of Operation Overlord, the village of Menil-Jean saw the men of the village forced to enlist to work in a slaughterhouse, killing 200 animals a day to feed the German soldiers on the frontline. This lasted until the Germans withdrew on the 18th August Seeing the Villette Bridge which crossed the Orne being destroyed by mines.

On the 18th August in Putanges-Pont-Écrepin the Germans also blew up the bridge in to stop the Allied forces advancing. The British 11th Armoured Division arrived a little later and liberated Putanges after some fighting. The British crossed the river during the evening of the 18th and early morning of the 19th August finding no resistance once crossed, however losing 10 lives liberating the town. The next day the 29th Armoured Brigade installed a Bailey bridge over the arches of the destroyed bridge to reconnect the two sides of the town.

=== Post war ===
The bridge at Putanges-Pont Ecripin was rebuilt in 1958 and called the 11th British Division Bridge in honour of two bodies of soldiers, Lieutenant Barry Grierson and Clifors Vincent Thomas discovered under the rubble while the bridge was being rebuilt.

In 1960 the Plessis Dam was built in Rabodanges by EDF, this created the Lac de Rabodanges.

In 1965 the Villages of Putanges and Pont-Ecripin formally merge to form the commune of Putanges-Pont Ecripin

On the 1st January 2016 the commune of Putanges-le-Lac was formed.

== Population ==
Population data refer to the area corresponding with the commune as of January 2025.

Historical population
Year	Pop.	±% p.a.
1968	2,381	—
1975	2,179	−1.26%
1982	2,155	−0.16%
1990	2,118	−0.22%
1999	2,069	−0.26%
2007	2,178	+0.64%
2012	2,156	−0.20%
2017	2,181	+0.23%
2023	2,093	−0.68%
Source: INSEE

== Points of Interest ==
- Lac de Rabodanges is a 6 km artificial lake covering almost 240 acres, making it the largest lake in Lower Normandy. It was created in 1960 after completion of building a dam at Rabodanges. The dam is 160 meters long and 17 metres high holding back 6 million cubic meters of water. The water intake for the power plant is located on the right bank and includes an underground chamber dug 40 meters deep into the granite. The turbine, installed in this chamber, receives water from a 53-meter drop with a flow rate of 16 cubic meters per second. With a power of 9,500 horsepower, it drives a 6,600-watt alternator.

The lake is now a popular tourist destination and had a designated swimming area opened in August 2022.

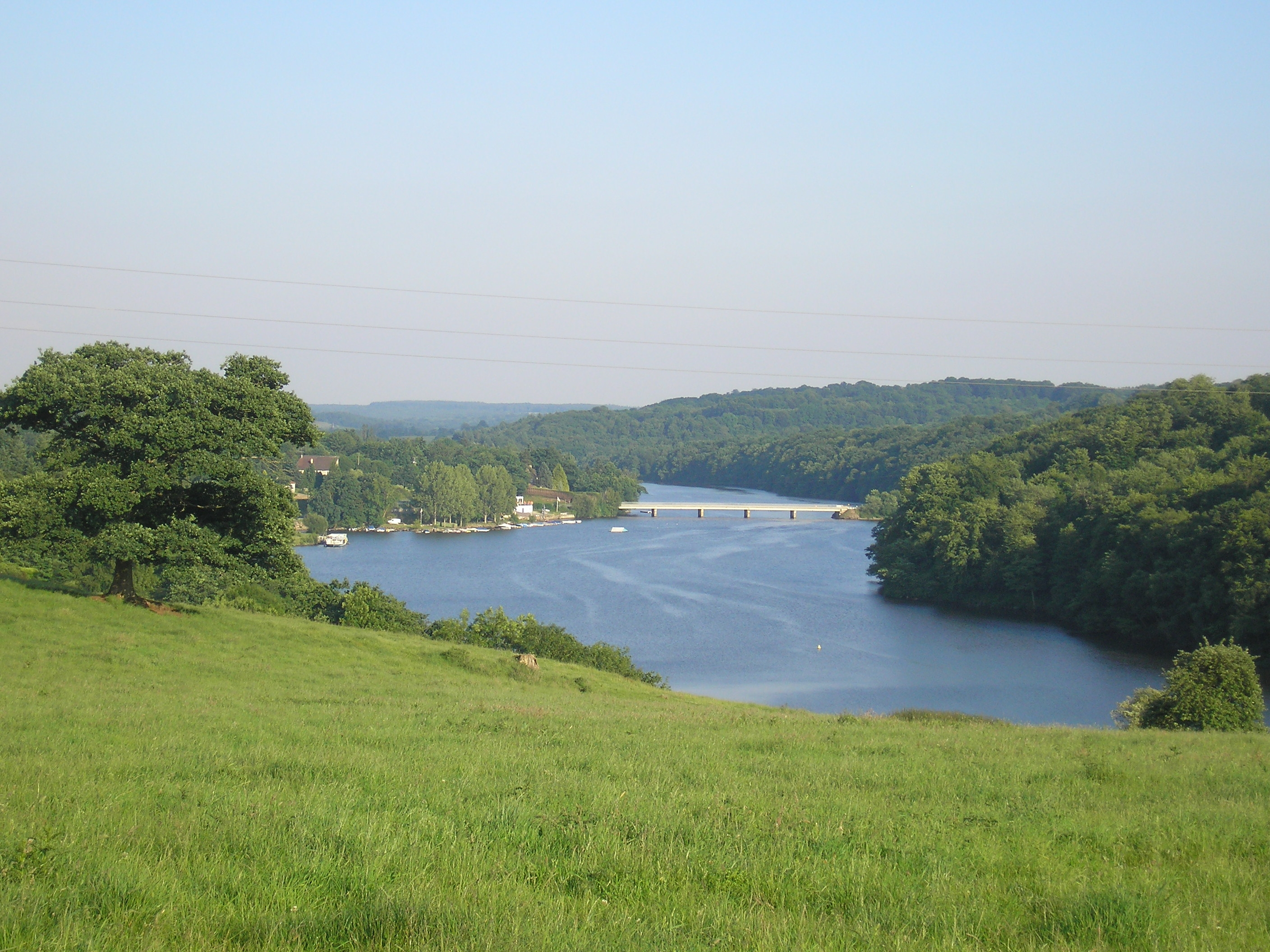
Rabodanges Lac

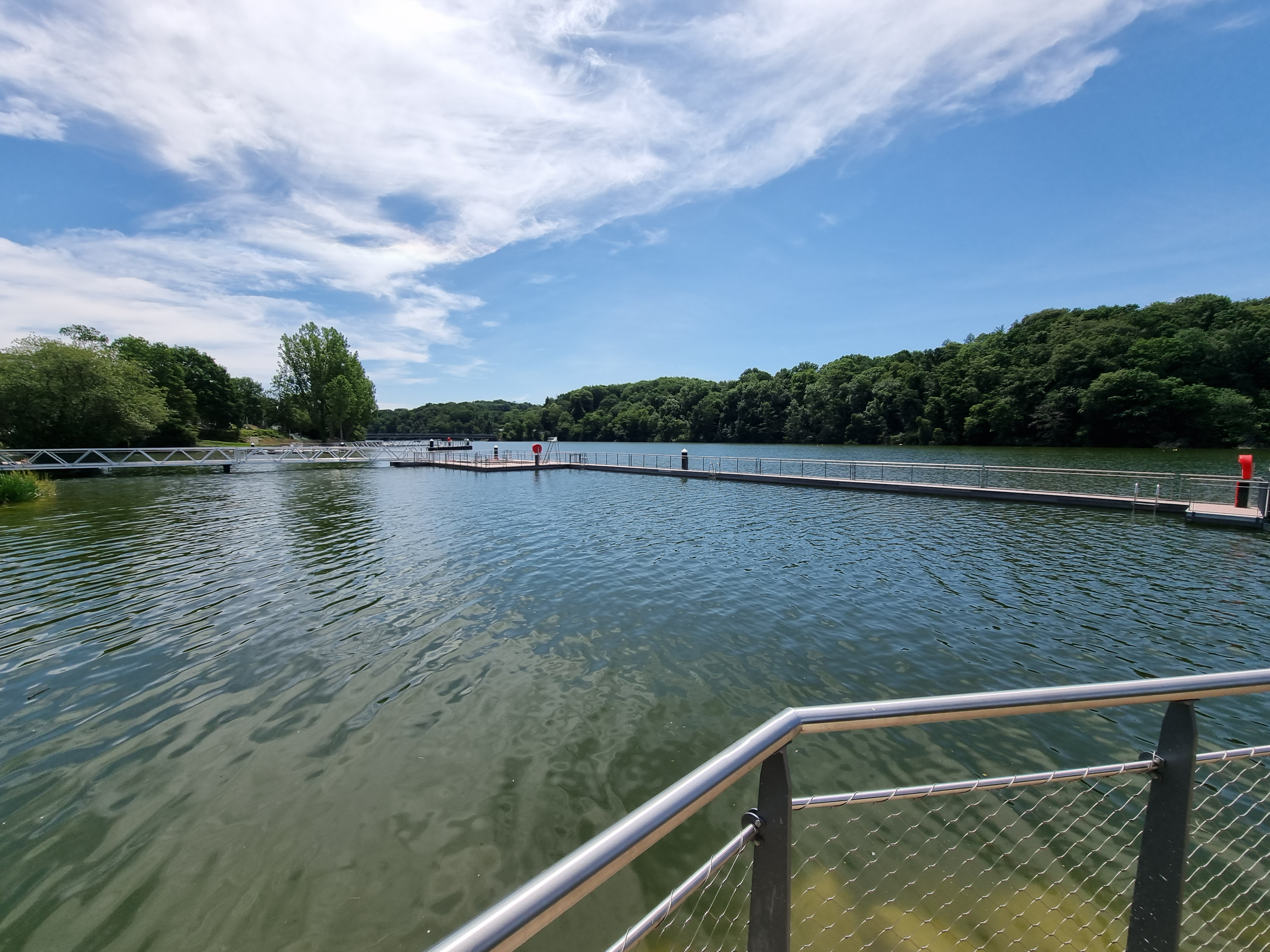
Lac de Rabodanges Swimming area
- Pierre de la Roussellière is a Menhir in Forêt-Auvray.

=== National heritage sites ===
The Commune has 6 buildings and areas listed as a Monument historique.

Manoir de la Cour is a 15th-century manor house in Saint-Aubert-sur-Orne with later additions added in the 17th century, classed as a Monument historique in 2011.

Former village of Vieux-Saint-Aubert the remains of a village in Saint-Aubert-sur-Orne with buildings dated from the 12th and 14th century, that was registered as a Monument Historique in 1992.

Château de Rabodanges is a 17th-century chateau built in place of a feudal castle destroyed in 1628 by order of Cardinal Richelieu. It is based in Rabodanges and in 1981 was classed as a Monument Historique

Château of la Forêt-Auvray is a 16th-century Huguenots fort, which in 2002 was registered as a Monument Historique.

Château du Meal is a 17th-century chateau in Chênedouit registered as a Monument historique in 1967.

La Droite Pierre Menhir is a Neolithic Menhir based in Chênedouit was classed as a Monument Historique in 1981.

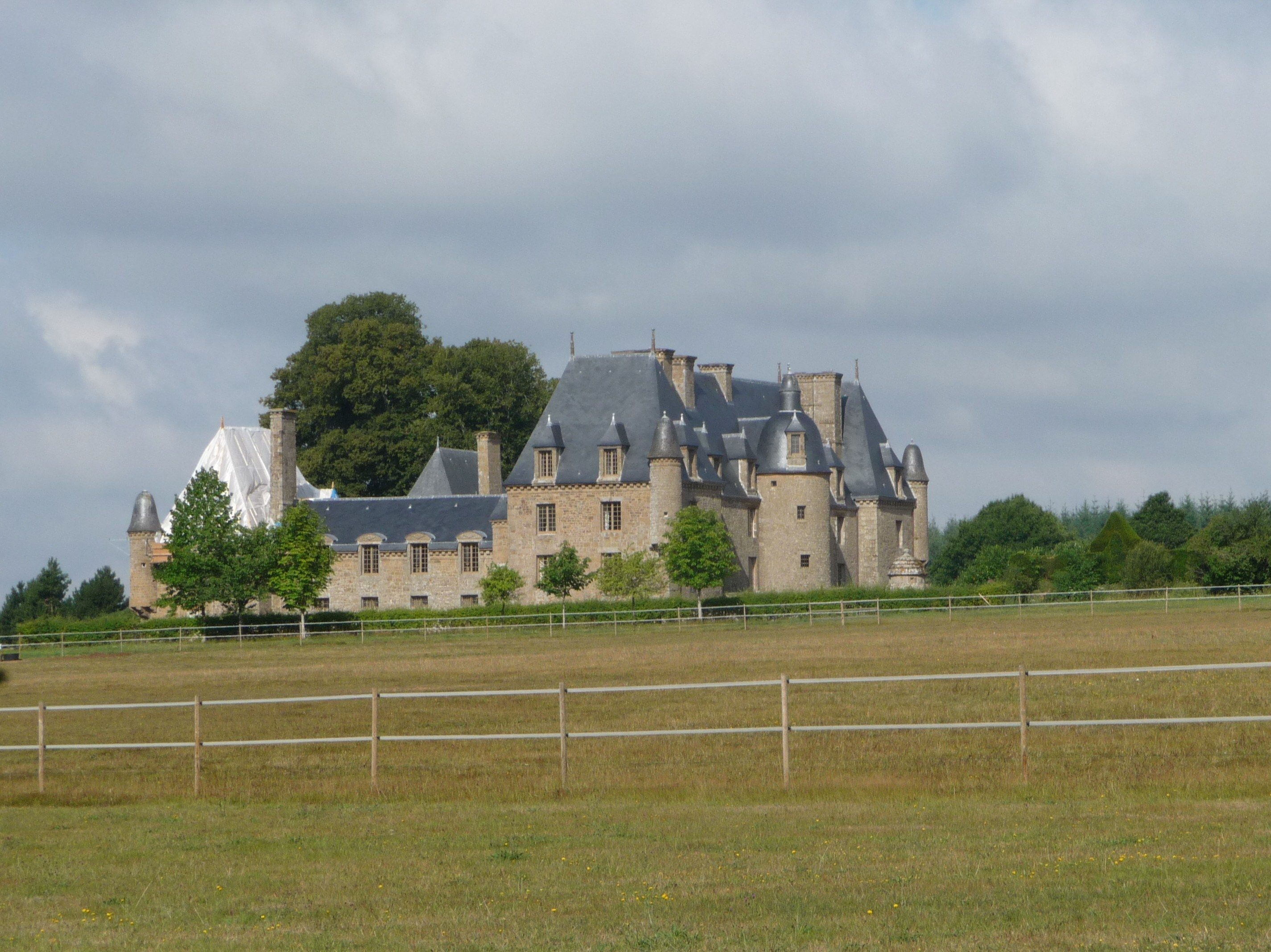
Chateau du repas

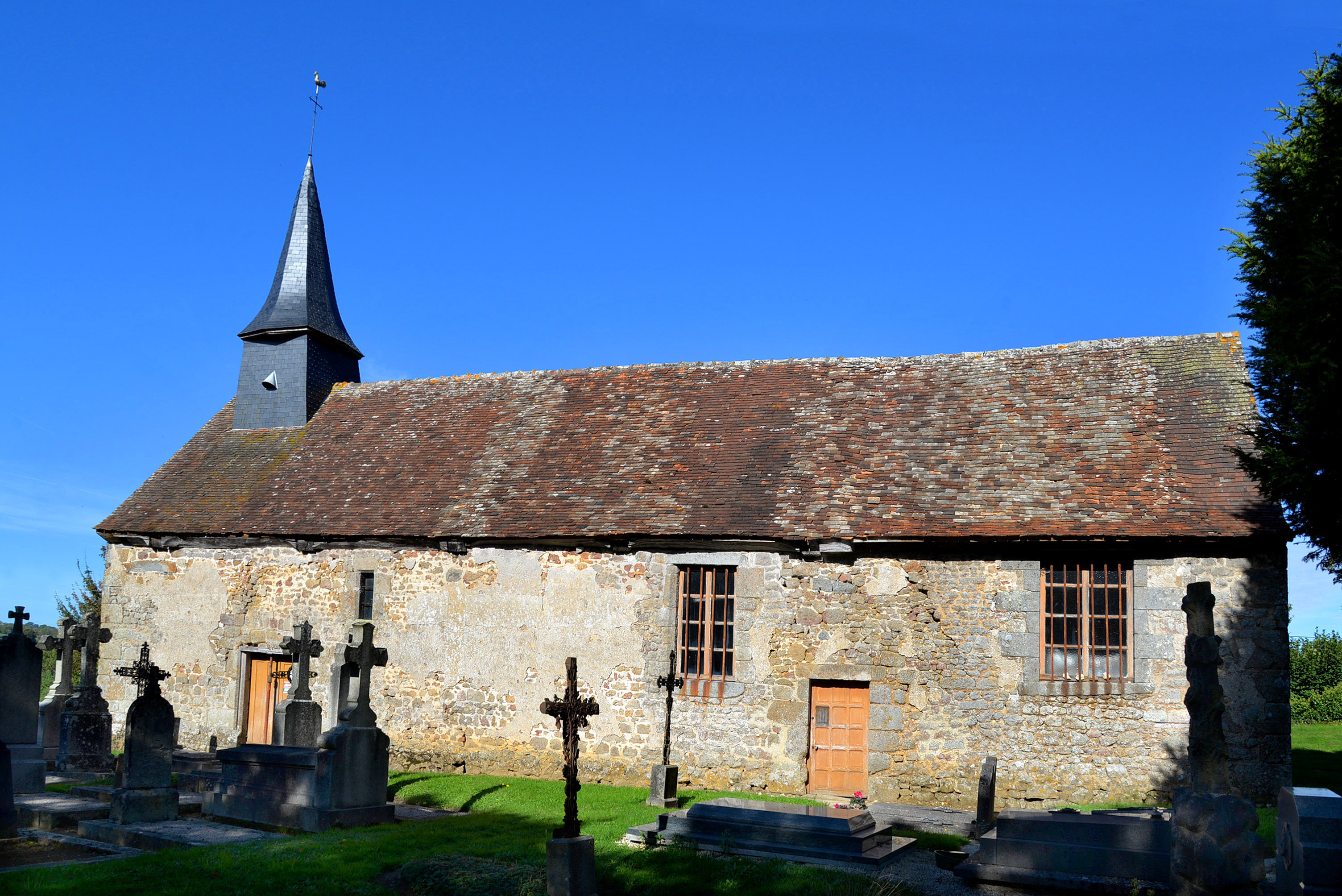
Chapelle Saint-Malo de la Fresnaye-au-Sauvage

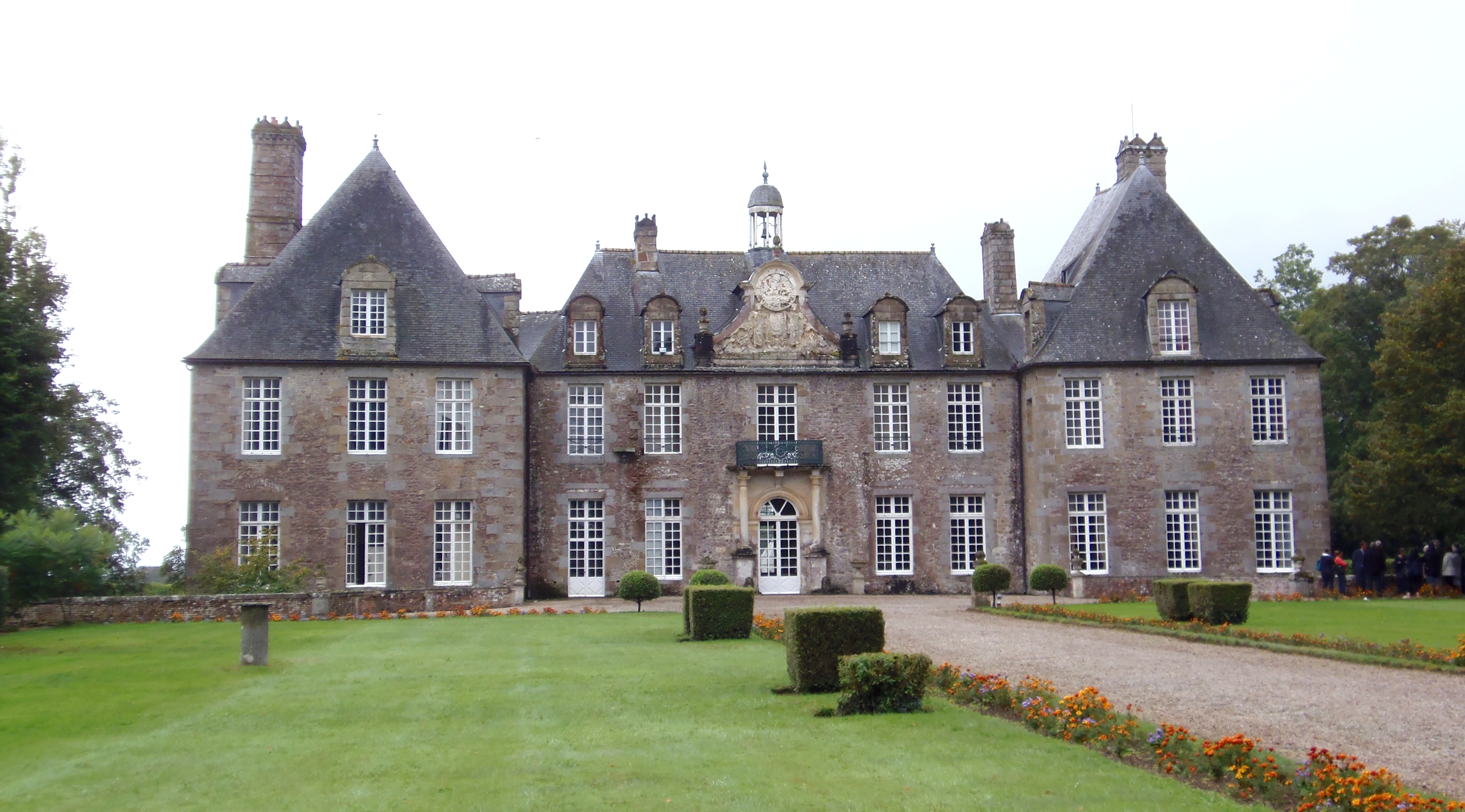
Rabodanges Chateau

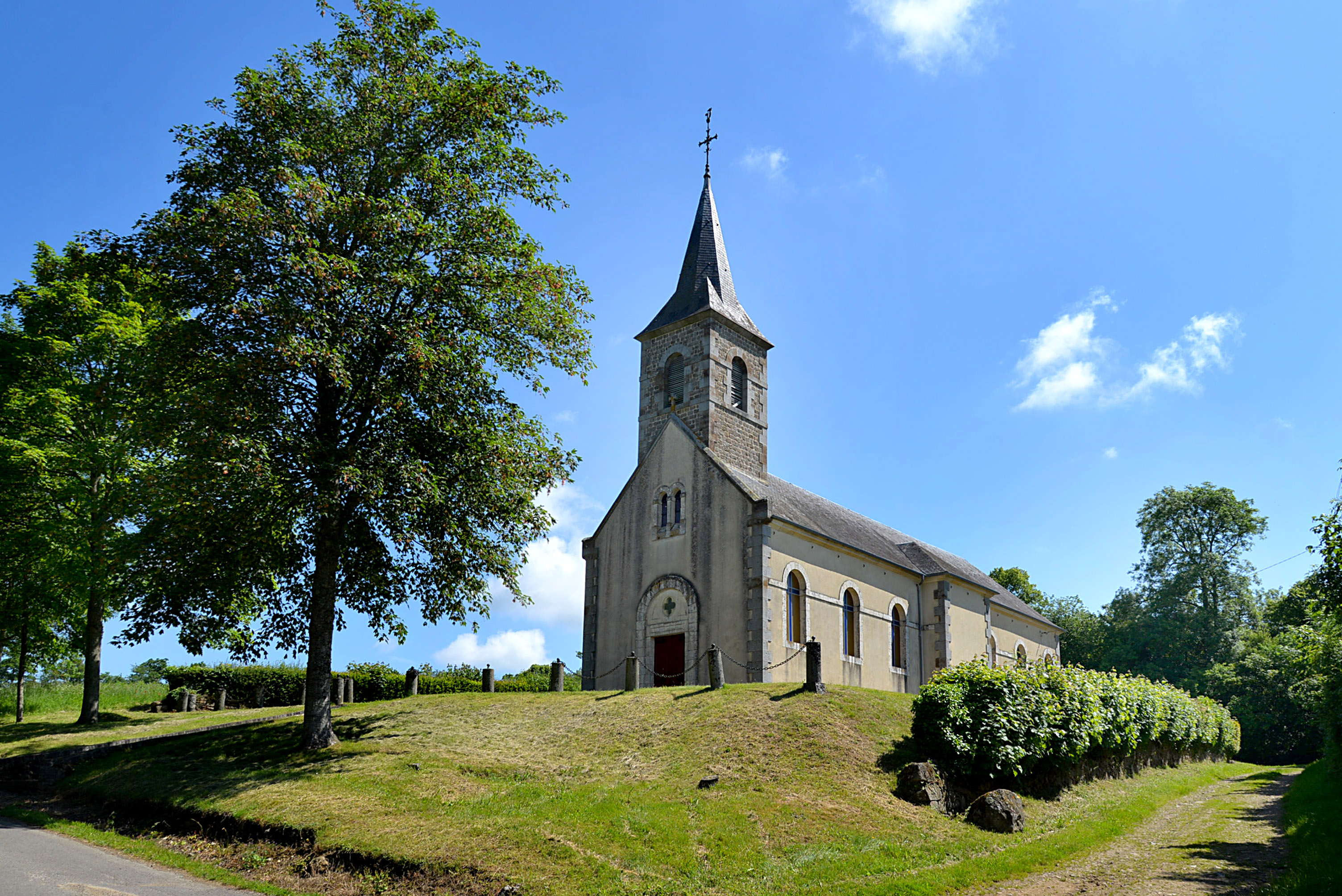
Église Notre-Dame-de-l'Assomption des Rotours

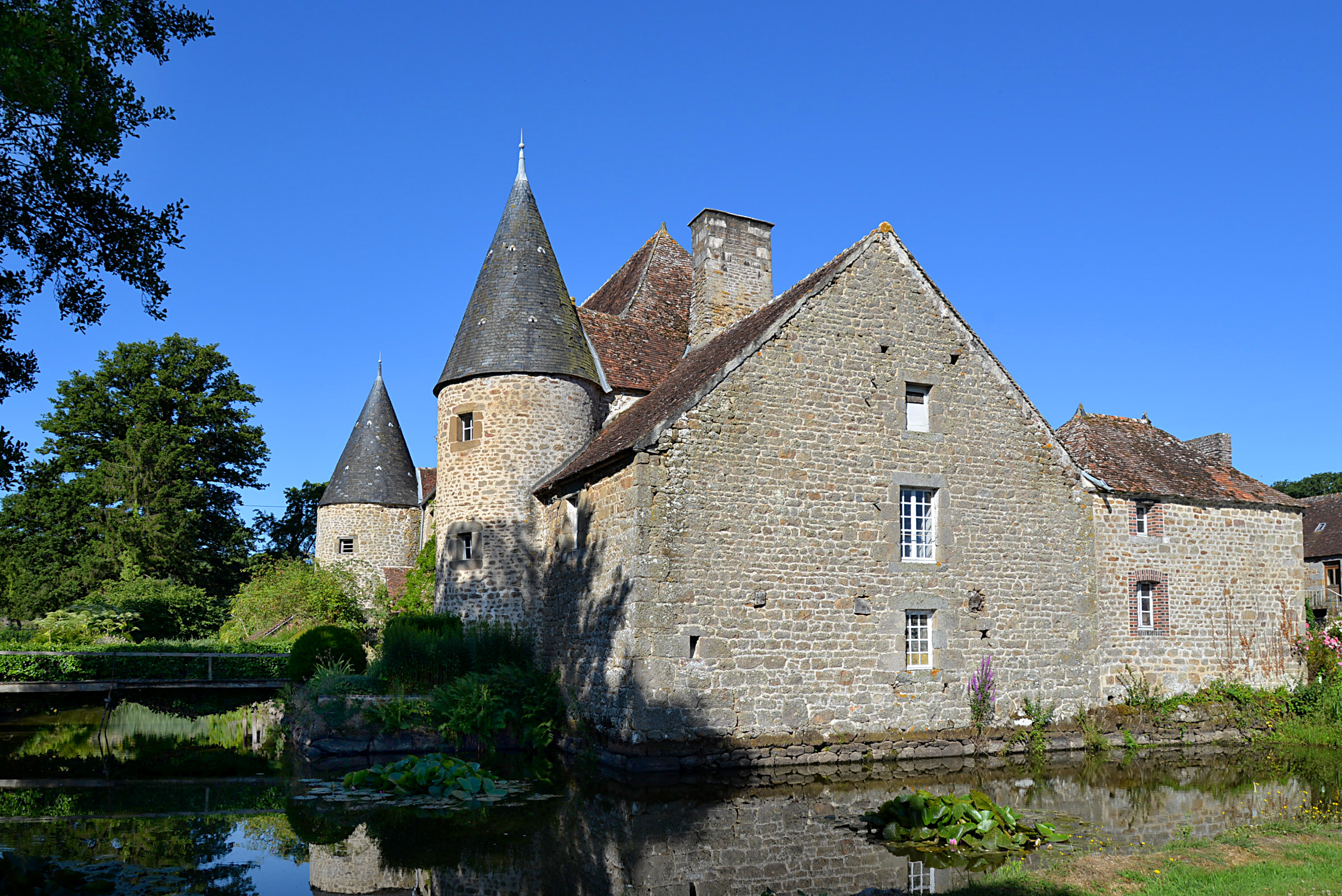
Manoir de Sainte-Croix-sur-Orne

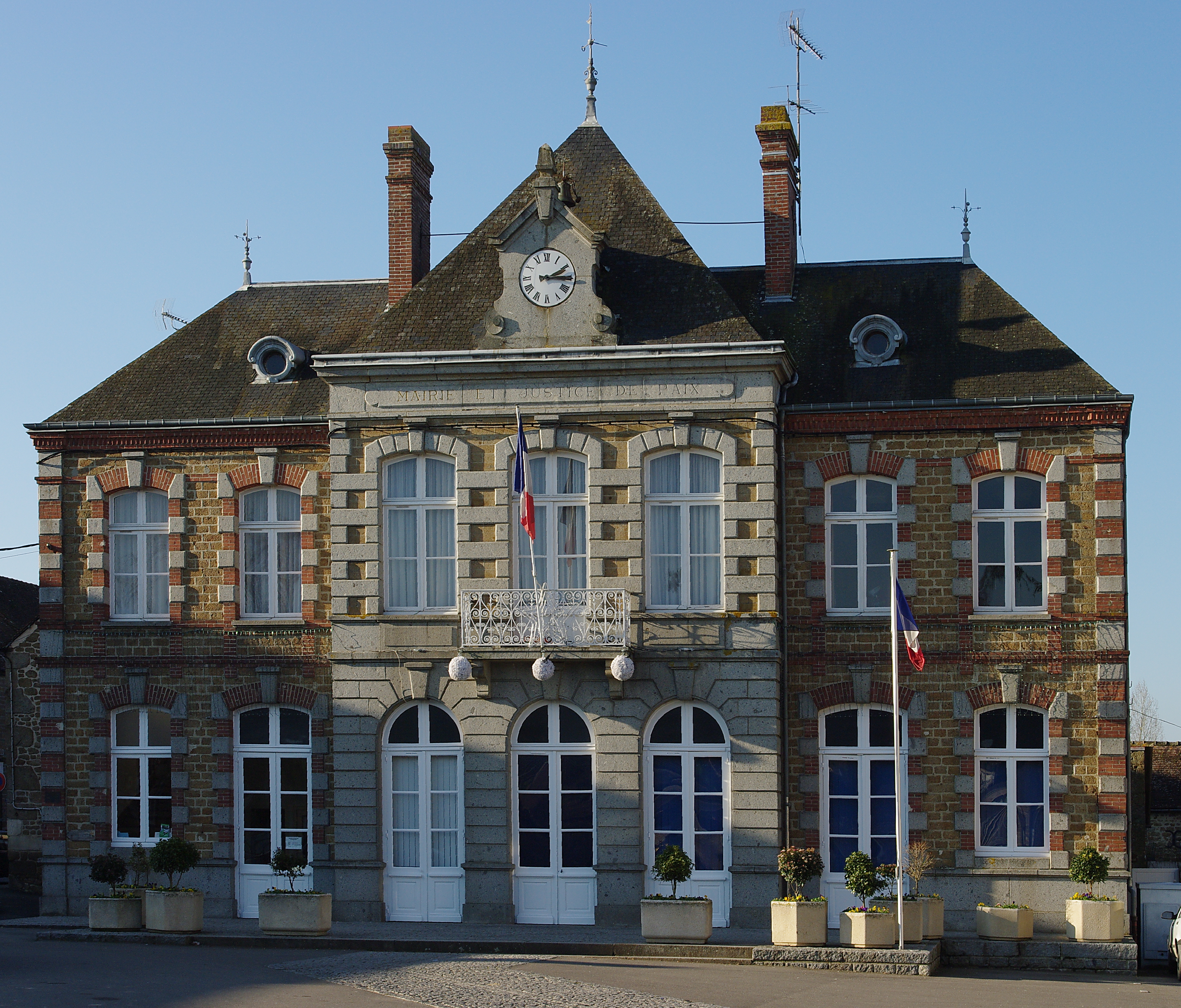
Putanges mairie

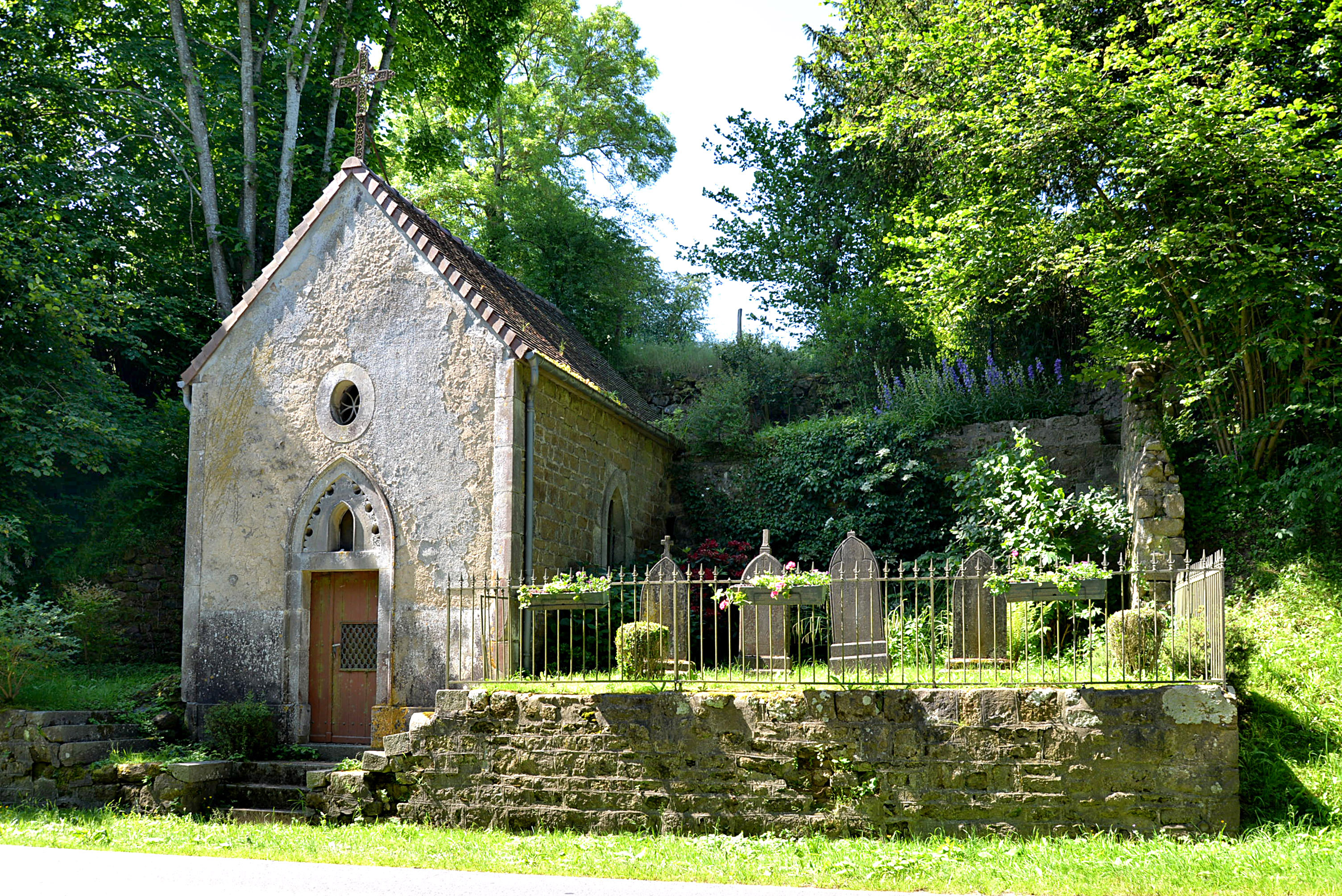
Chapelle Sainte-Geneviève de Putanges-Pont-Écrepin

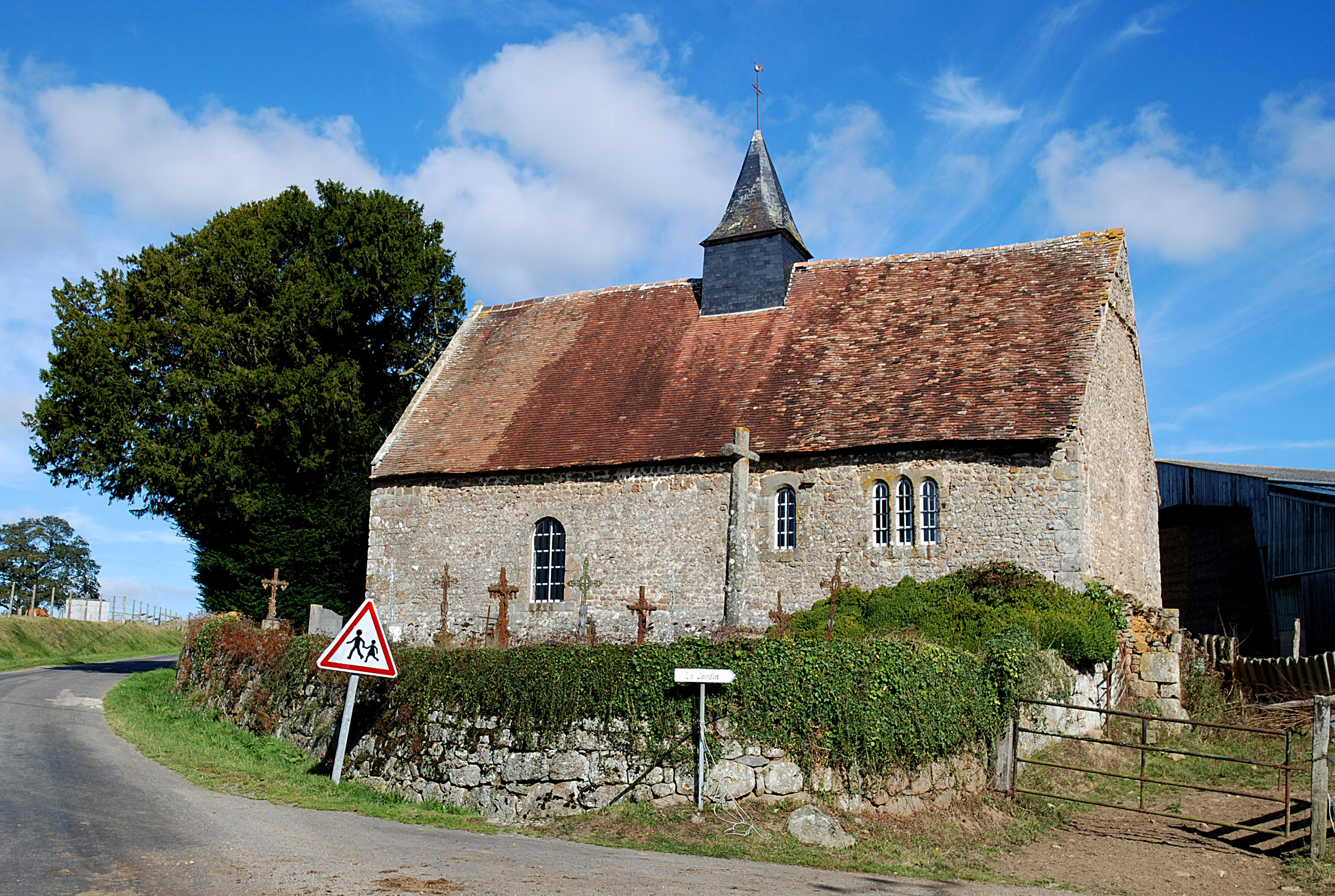
Église Notre-Dame de Méguillaume

== Sport ==
The commune has an annual Hill climb motor event at La Forêt-Auvray. It has been running since 1969 and features winners such as Guy Fréquelin.

== Notable people ==
- Robert d'Aguiló a Norman Knight born c.1100AD in Rabodanges.
- Jean Vauquelin de la Fresnaye a French poet born at the château of La Fresnaye-au-Sauvage in 1536.
- Charles-François Toustain a French historian and a member of the Benedictine Congregation of Saint Maur was born in Le Repas in 1700.
- Guillaume-René Lefébure a French military, historian, physician, political writer and man of letters born in 1744 at Sainte-Croix-sur-Orne.
- Stanislas Sorel a French civil engineer, inventor, and chemist, raised the son of a poor clock-maker was born here in 1803.
- Louis Dartige du Fournet was a French vice admiral during World War I born here in 1856.
- Robert Guérin du Rocher a Jesuit priest, who was beatified by Pope Pius XI in October 1926, was born in Repas.

== See also ==
- Communes of the Orne department
