= Ménil-Hermei =

- Commune
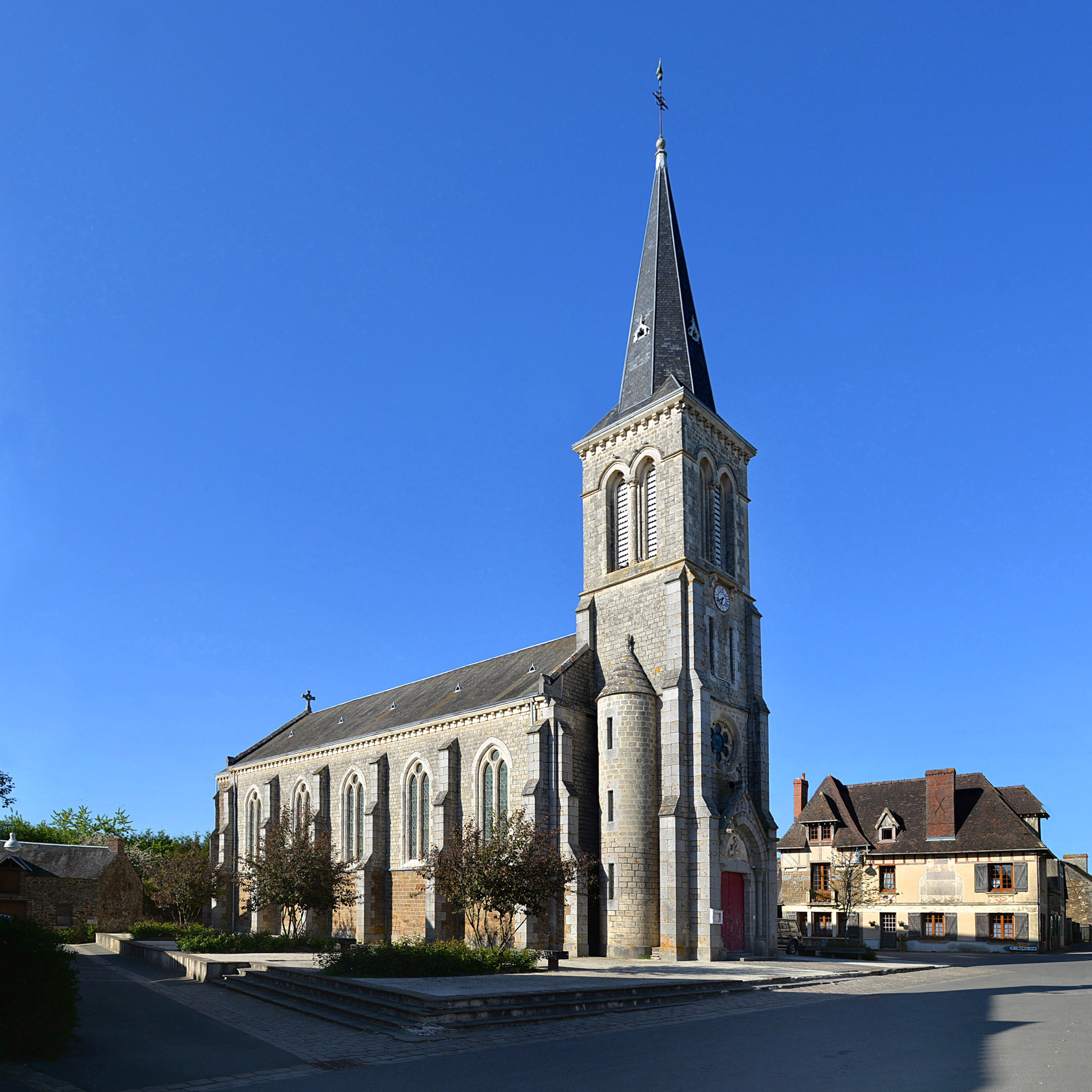
- The church in Ménil-Hermei
- Location of Ménil-Hermei
- Location within France Location within Normandy
- Coordinates: 48°49′38″N 0°19′30″W
- Country: France
- Region: Normandy
- Department: Orne
- Arrondissement: Argentan
- Canton: Athis-Val de Rouvre
- Intercommunality: Val d'Orne

Government
  - Mayor (2020–2026): Katia Halluin
- Area^{1}: 6.61 km^{2} (2.55 sq mi)
- Elevation: 171 m (561 ft)
- Highest elevation: 216 m (709 ft)
- Lowest elevation: 63 m (207 ft)
- Population (2023): 208
  - Density: 31.5/km^{2} (81.5/sq mi)
- Time zone: UTC+01:00 (CET)
  - Summer (DST): UTC+02:00 (CEST)
- INSEE/Postal code: 61267 /61210
- ^{1} French Land Register data, which excludes lakes, ponds, glaciers > 1 km^{2} (0.386 sq mi or 247 acres) and river estuaries.

Ménil-Hermei (French pronunciation: [menil ɛʁmɛ]) is a commune in the Orne department in the Normandy region of north-western France.

== Geography ==
The commune of Ménil-Hermei is part of the area known as Suisse Normande.

The commune is made up of the following collection of villages and hamlets, Ménil-Hermei, La Viéville, Le Mois and Le Vivier.

The Commune with another 20 communes shares part of a 2,115 hectare, Natura 2000 conservation area, called the Vallée de l'Orne et ses affluents.

The commune has two rivers flowing through it, the Orne and its tributary the Baize.

== Administration ==
The mayor is Katia Halluin, elected in 2020.

== Demography ==
Historical population
Year	Pop.	±% p.a.
1968	208	—
1975	203	−0.35%
1982	210	+0.49%
1990	176	−2.18%
1999	155	−1.40%
2007	190	+2.58%
2012	211	+2.12%
2017	203	−0.77%
2023	208	+0.41%
Source: INSEE

== History ==
- In 1321, Jean de Corday bought the fief of Mesnil-Hermey.
- In 1465, the title of nobility of Raoul de Corday du Mesnil-Hermé is confirmed.
- In 1505, Marguerite - the daughter of Guillaume "Raoult", Esquire, Lord of Mesnil-Hermey - marries Thomas Williamson, a Scottish knight staying in France with the French king, Charles VIII).
- In the 18th century, the land of Mesnil-Hermey belonged to the Marquis de Rabodanges.

== Places of interest ==
- The valley of the river Orne with:
  - the raised stone which bygone people named: "Pierre à Gargantua".
  - the rock called "Bec Corbin", dominating the river, at the foot of which passed the old stone road from Domfront to Falaise, via Durcet, La Forêt-Auvray and Ménil-Hermei.

Between these two towns, the road followed (unlike the current asphalt road) the route of the old path of "Bougas". It was by this route that the imposing stone pedestal of the monument to William the Conqueror, erected at the foot of Falaise Castle in 1850, was sent, causing considerable difficulties for the horse teams between "Forest Bridge" and Ménil-Hermei.

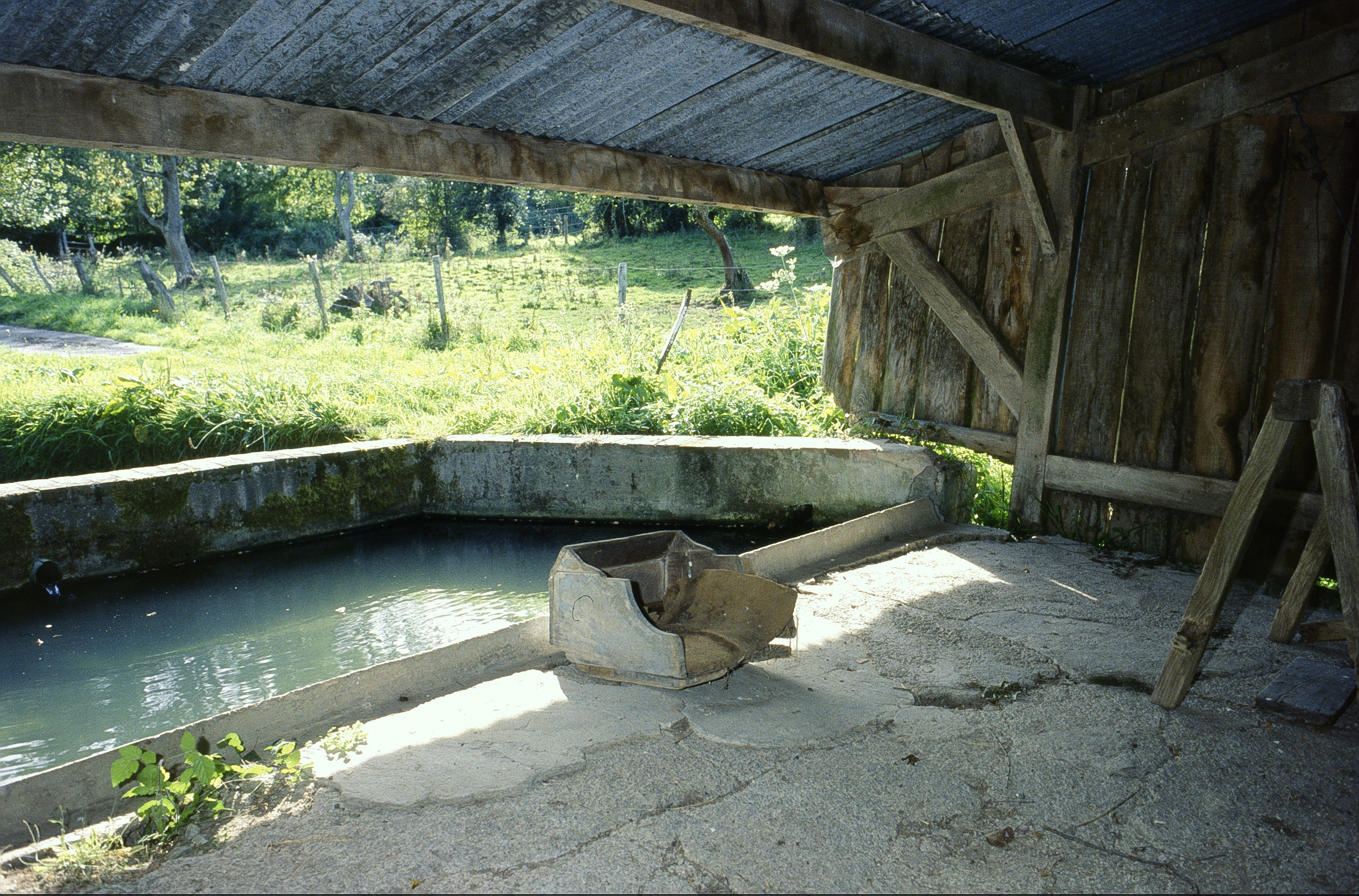
The Lavoir (washing place) of "La Vieville"

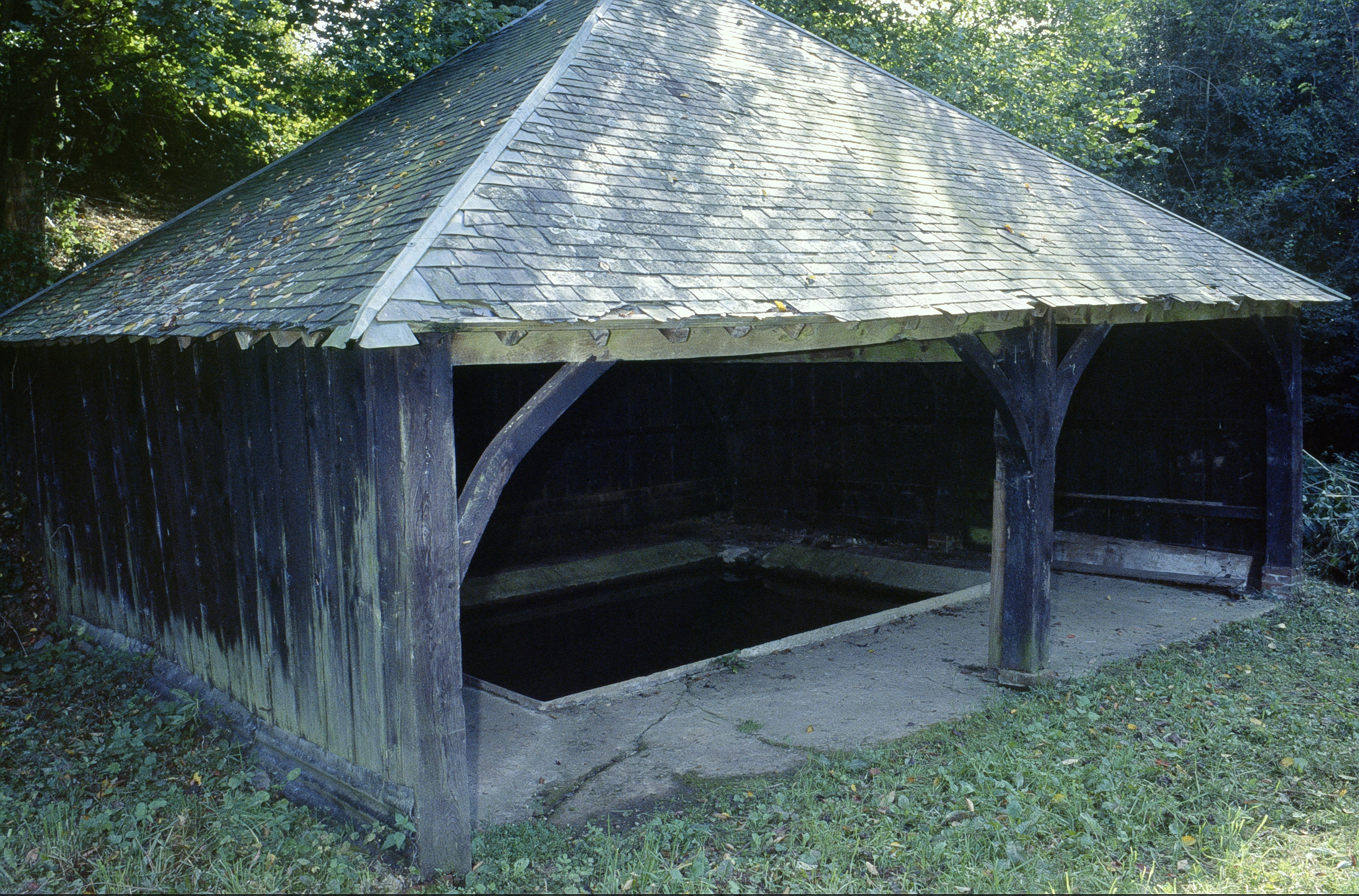
Another lavoir

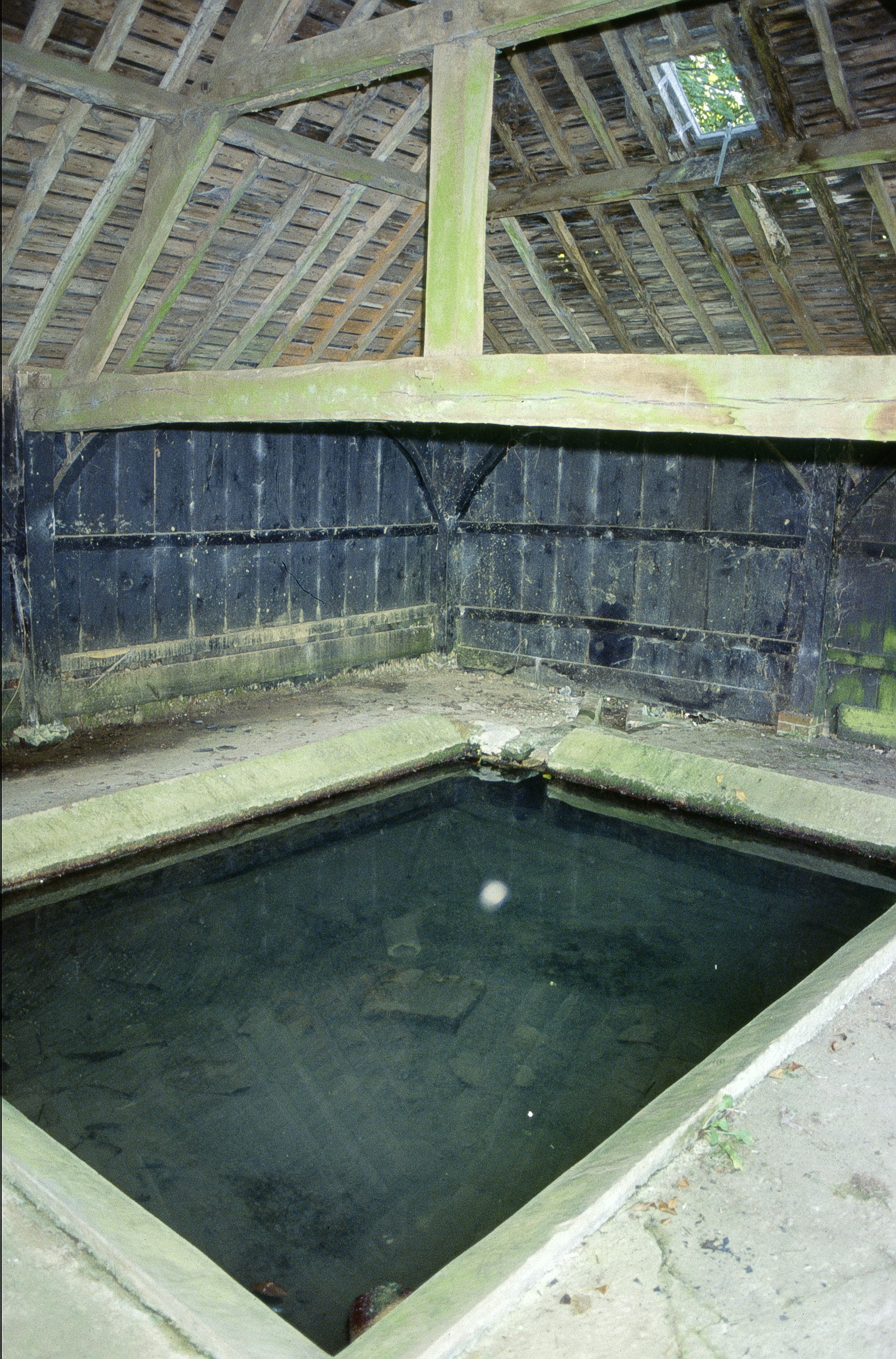
The interior of the lavoir

== See also ==
- Communes of the Orne department
