= Châtel de Sassy =

Ruined castle in Sassy, France

Coordinates: 48.9790°N 0.1471°W

The Châtel de Sassy is a ruined castle in the commune of Sassy in the Calvados département of France.

The castle dates from the 11th century. A charter from 1175 records the owner as Robert de Sassy. A study in 1887 described the remains as a large rectangular enceinte with a turret in each corner. A second enceinte was defended by a moat cut into the rock.

The castle is private property.

== See also ==
- List of castles in France
