= Sassy, Calvados =

Sassy
- Commune
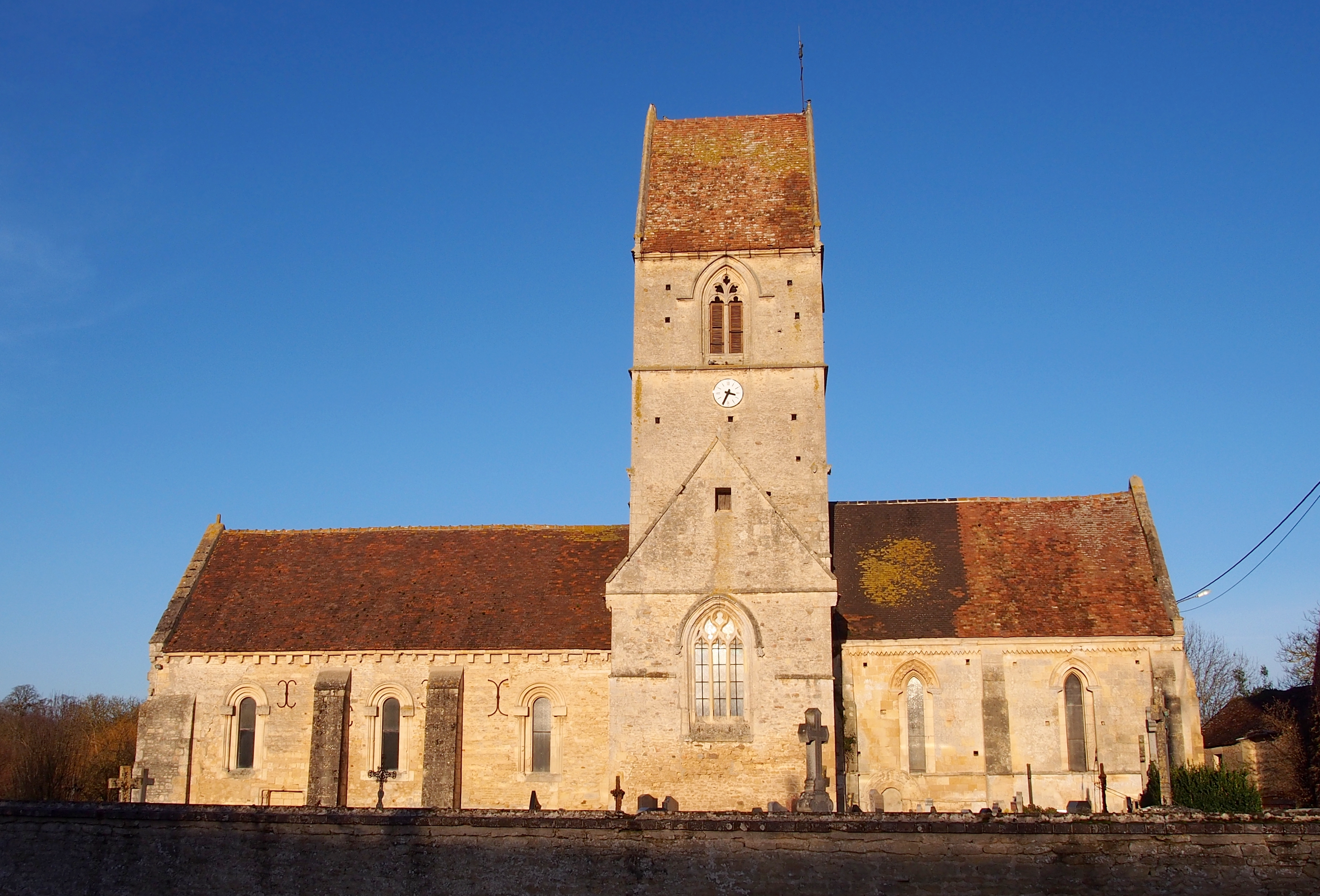
- The church in Sassy

- Coat of arms
- Location of Sassy
- Location within France Location within Normandy
- Coordinates: 48°59′07″N 0°08′16″W
- Country: France
- Region: Normandy
- Department: Calvados
- Arrondissement: Caen
- Canton: Falaise
- Intercommunality: Pays de Falaise

Government
  - Mayor (2020–2026): Dominique Varin
- Area^{1}: 9.56 km^{2} (3.69 sq mi)
- Elevation: 68 m (223 ft)
- Highest elevation: 104 m (341 ft)
- Lowest elevation: 51 m (167 ft)
- Population (2023): 217
  - Density: 22.7/km^{2} (58.8/sq mi)
- Time zone: UTC+01:00 (CET)
  - Summer (DST): UTC+02:00 (CEST)
- INSEE/Postal code: 14669 /14170
- ^{1} French Land Register data, which excludes lakes, ponds, glaciers > 1 km^{2} (0.386 sq mi or 247 acres) and river estuaries.

Sassy (French pronunciation: [sasi]) is a commune in the Calvados department in the Normandy region in northwestern France.

== Population ==
Historical population
Year	Pop.	±% p.a.
1968	248	—
1975	219	−1.76%
1982	213	−0.40%
1990	194	−1.16%
1999	184	−0.59%
2007	190	+0.40%
2012	200	+1.03%
2017	209	+0.88%
2023	217	+0.63%
Source: INSEE

== Points of Interest ==
=== National heritage sites ===
The commune has two sites listed as a Monument historique.

- Saint-Gervais-et-Saint-Protais - a twelfth century church, whose seigneurial chapel was built by Jean de Vauquelin it was listed as a monument in 1928.
- Châtelet Farm - a sixteenth and seventeenth century farm that was built by Jean Vauquelin de la Fresnaye, and then by his son Nicolas Vauquelin des Yveteaux it was listed as a monument in 1932.

== See also ==
- Communes of the Calvados department
