= Jean Julien Angot des Rotours =

French colonial governor

Jean Julien Angot, baron des Rotours (2 June 1778 Les Rotours, Orne - 28 March 1844 Paris) was a French colonial governor.

== Biography ==
He was born in the castle of Rotours, and entered the French Navy, 11 June 1791, with which he took part in the expedition of 1793 to Santo Domingo, and assisted in the engagement at Cape Français, 21 June, where, although bearing a flag of truce, he was taken prisoner, but afterward released. He went on a United States merchant vessel to Philadelphia, where he was furnished the means of returning to France. He was promoted commander in 1808, and captain in 1814, and 1816-1819 made a successful campaign in the West Indian waters, for which he was created Baron, 25 May 1819. Afterward, he was despatched with a corvette to protect the French fisheries on the coast of Newfoundland, when a difficulty with England threatened to end in war, and was promoted to rear admiral in 1821.

Rotours was appointed governor-general of Guadeloupe in 1826, arrived at Basse-Terre on 31 May, and found that the city had been nearly destroyed by the hurricane of 26 July 1825. He immediately began to rebuild it on a more elaborate plan, and, after inquiring into the wants of the colony, proposed to the king a plan to unify the colonial administration, by which the island was allowed partial self-government through delegates that formed a council general. Rotours also provided means to check the return of yellow fever epidemics, established a hospital and a camp for the soldiers on Matouba volcano, at the coolest station in the mountains, drained the marshes that surrounded Pointe-à-Pitre, executed great works in that harbor, completed the canal named Vatable, and also constructed in Grande-Terre several other canals, which proved of great benefit to the colony. One of these has since received the name of Canal des Rotours. He founded the city of Bordeaux-Bourg, erected schools, churches, and bridges, and opened roads.

Under his administration, Guadeloupe attained a high state of prosperity, and when Rotours obtained his recall in May 1830, regret was felt at his departure. His works include Mémoire sur le mode de procédure criminelle en vigueur à la Guadeloupe (Paris, 1826).
