= Les Yveteaux =

- Commune
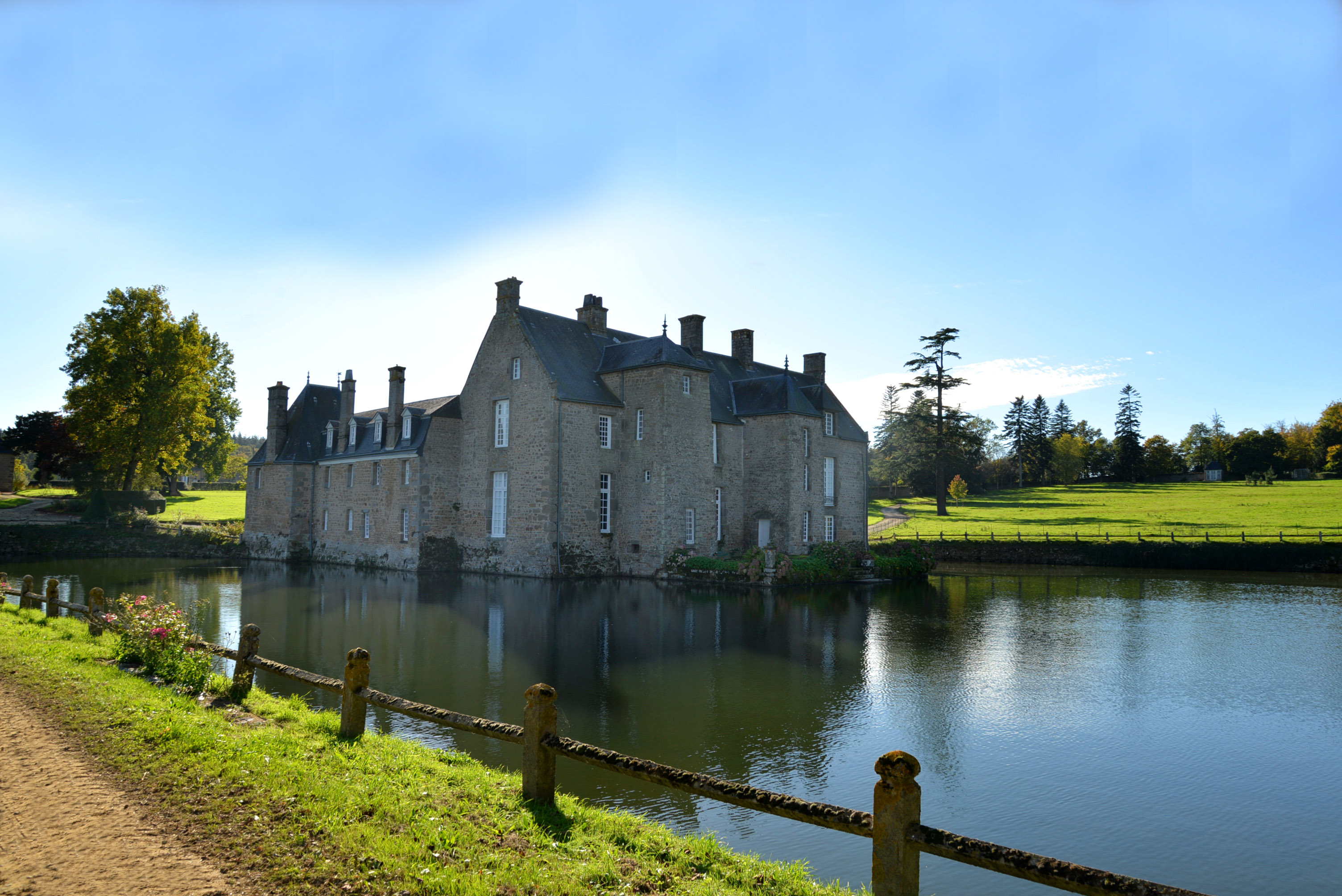
- The chateau in Les Yveteaux
- Location of Les Yveteaux
- Location within France Location within Normandy
- Coordinates: 48°42′23″N 0°16′20″W
- Country: France
- Region: Normandy
- Department: Orne
- Arrondissement: Argentan
- Canton: Athis-Val de Rouvre
- Intercommunality: Val d'Orne

Government
  - Mayor (2020–2026): Marie-Cécile Leperlier
- Area^{1}: 5.79 km^{2} (2.24 sq mi)
- Elevation: 239 m (784 ft)
- Highest elevation: 261 m (856 ft)
- Lowest elevation: 190 m (620 ft)
- Population (2023): 101
  - Density: 17.4/km^{2} (45.2/sq mi)
- Time zone: UTC+01:00 (CET)
  - Summer (DST): UTC+02:00 (CEST)
- INSEE/Postal code: 61512 /61210
- ^{1} French Land Register data, which excludes lakes, ponds, glaciers > 1 km^{2} (0.386 sq mi or 247 acres) and river estuaries.

Les Yveteaux (French pronunciation: [le.z‿ivto]) is a commune in the Orne department in north-western France.

== Geography ==
The commune is made up of the following collection of villages and hamlets, La Gare, Le Château,La Pierre Hurel and Les Yveteaux.

The commune borders the area known as Suisse Normande.

Les Yveteaux along with another 65 communes is part of a 20,593 hectare, Natura 2000 conservation area, called the Haute vallée de l'Orne et affluents.

The Gué d'Arnettes stream is the only watercourse that runs through the commune.

== Notable buildings and places ==
=== National heritage sites ===
The Commune has 2 buildings and areas listed as a Monument historique

- Chateau of Ostieux a 15th Century Manor house registered as a Monument historique in 2005.
- Chateau of Yveteaux a 17th Century chateau registered as a Monument historique in 1988. The Chateau belonged to French poet Jean Vauquelin de la Fresnaye.
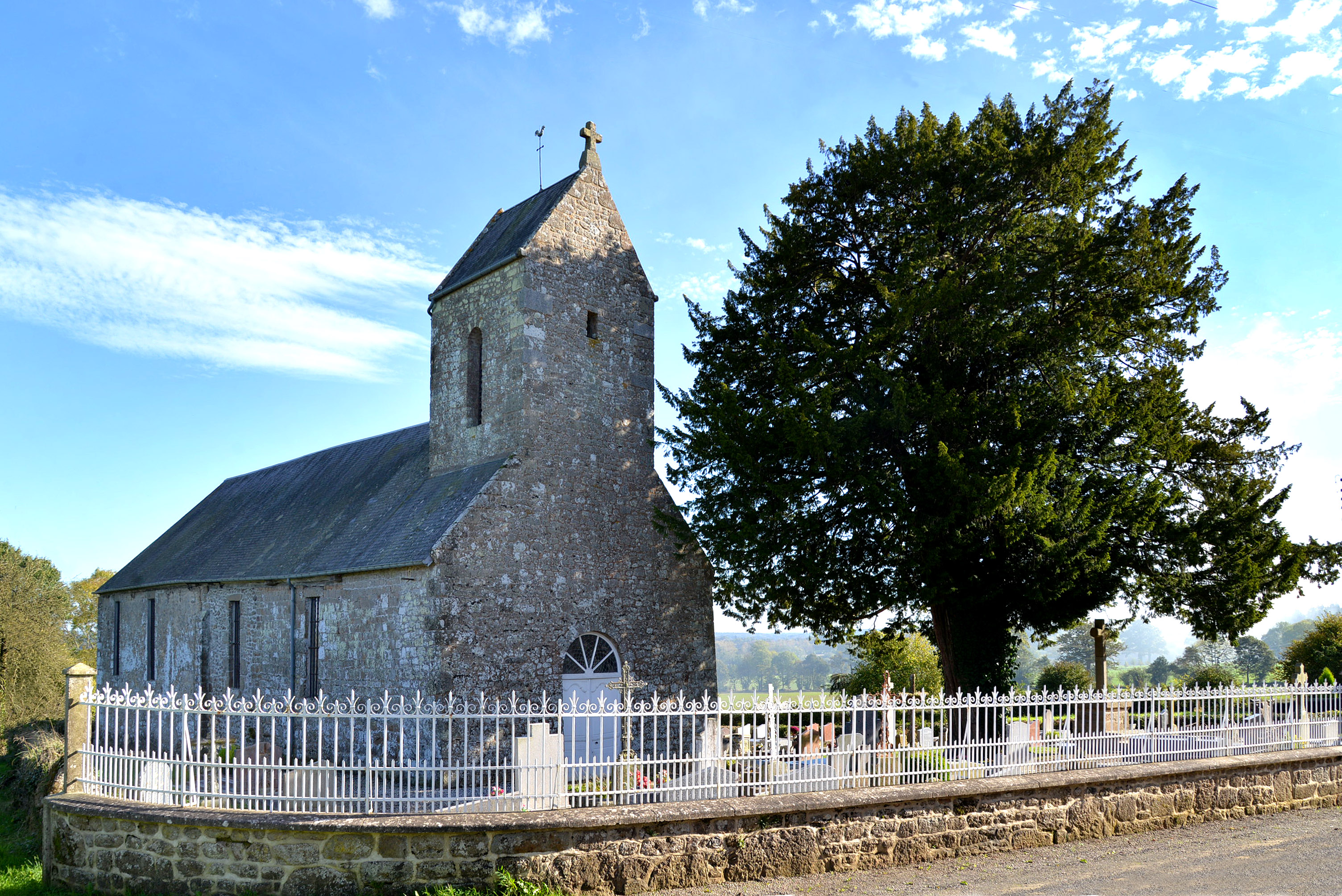
Church of Saint-Taurin in Yveteaux

== Notable people ==
- Jean Vauquelin de la Fresnaye a French Poet who was owner of the Chateau of Yveteaux.

== See also ==
Communes of the Orne department
