= Cahan, Orne =

Cahan
- Commune
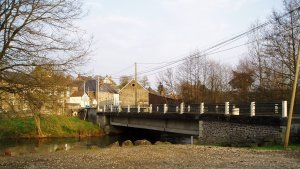
- The bridge in Cahan
- Location of Cahan
- Location within France Location within Normandy
- Coordinates: 48°51′35″N 0°26′31″W
- Country: France
- Region: Normandy
- Department: Orne
- Arrondissement: Argentan
- Canton: Athis-Val de Rouvre
- Intercommunality: CA Flers Agglo

Government
  - Mayor (2020–2026): Xavier De Saint Pol
- Area^{1}: 5.87 km^{2} (2.27 sq mi)
- Elevation: 140 m (460 ft)
- Highest elevation: 242 m (794 ft)
- Lowest elevation: 50 m (160 ft)
- Population (2023): 161
  - Density: 27.4/km^{2} (71.0/sq mi)
- Time zone: UTC+01:00 (CET)
  - Summer (DST): UTC+02:00 (CEST)
- INSEE/Postal code: 61069 /61430
- ^{1} French Land Register data, which excludes lakes, ponds, glaciers > 1 km^{2} (0.386 sq mi or 247 acres) and river estuaries.

Cahan is a commune in the Orne department in north-western France.

== Geography ==
The commune is part of the area known as Suisse Normande.

The commune is made up of the following collection of villages and hamlets, Fourneaux,La Bijude, Le Haut Vardon, Le Bas Vardon and Cahan.

The Commune with another 20 communes shares part of a 2,115 hectare, Natura 2000 conservation area, called the Vallée de l'Orne et ses affluents.

The commune has 2 watercourses running through it the river Noireau and 1 stream the Mare des Bois.

== Population ==
Historical population
Year	Pop.	±% p.a.
1968	250	—
1975	205	−2.80%
1982	223	+1.21%
1990	211	−0.69%
1999	187	−1.33%
2007	203	+1.03%
2012	155	−5.25%
2017	181	+3.15%
2023	161	−1.93%
Source: INSEE

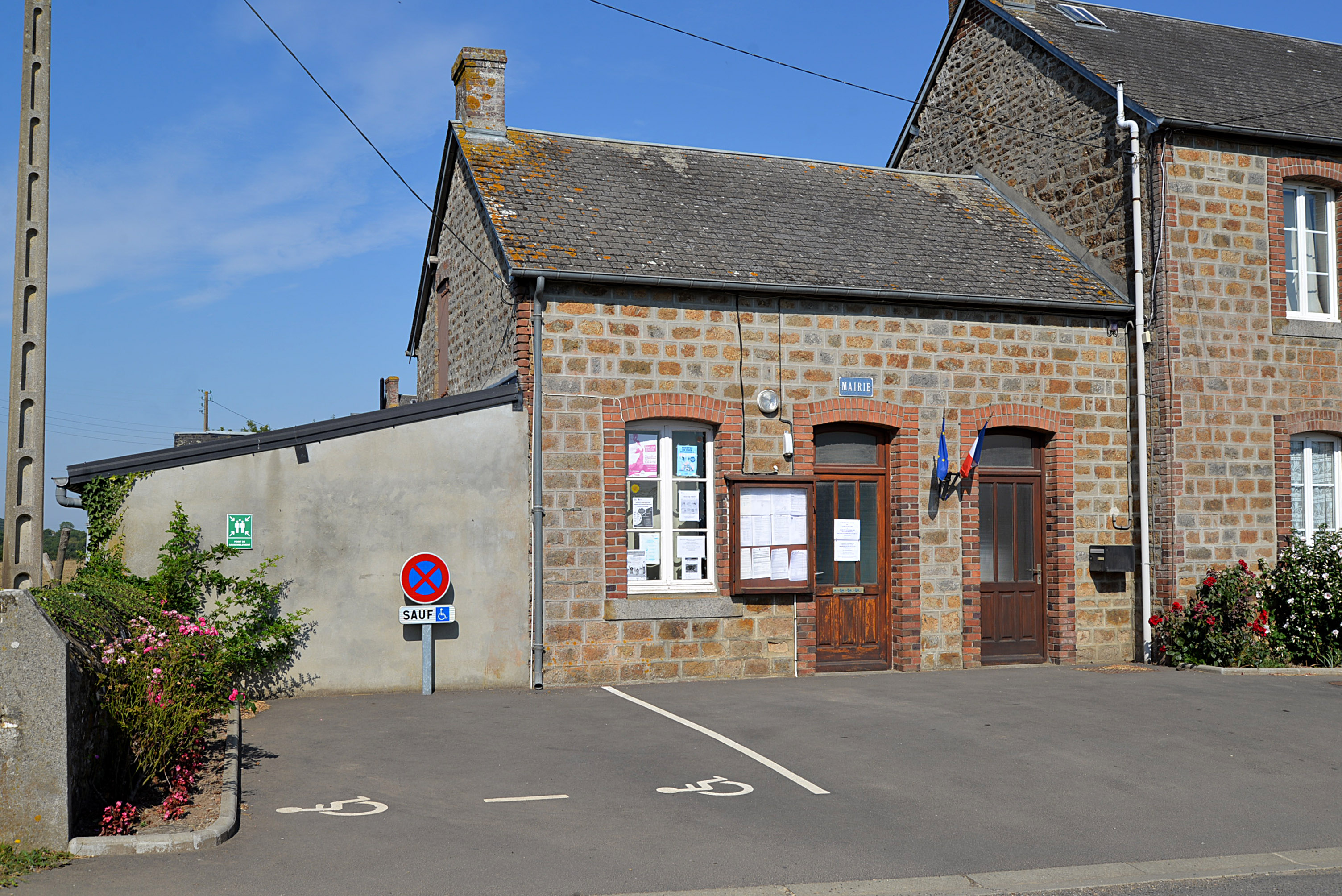
La mairie de Cahan

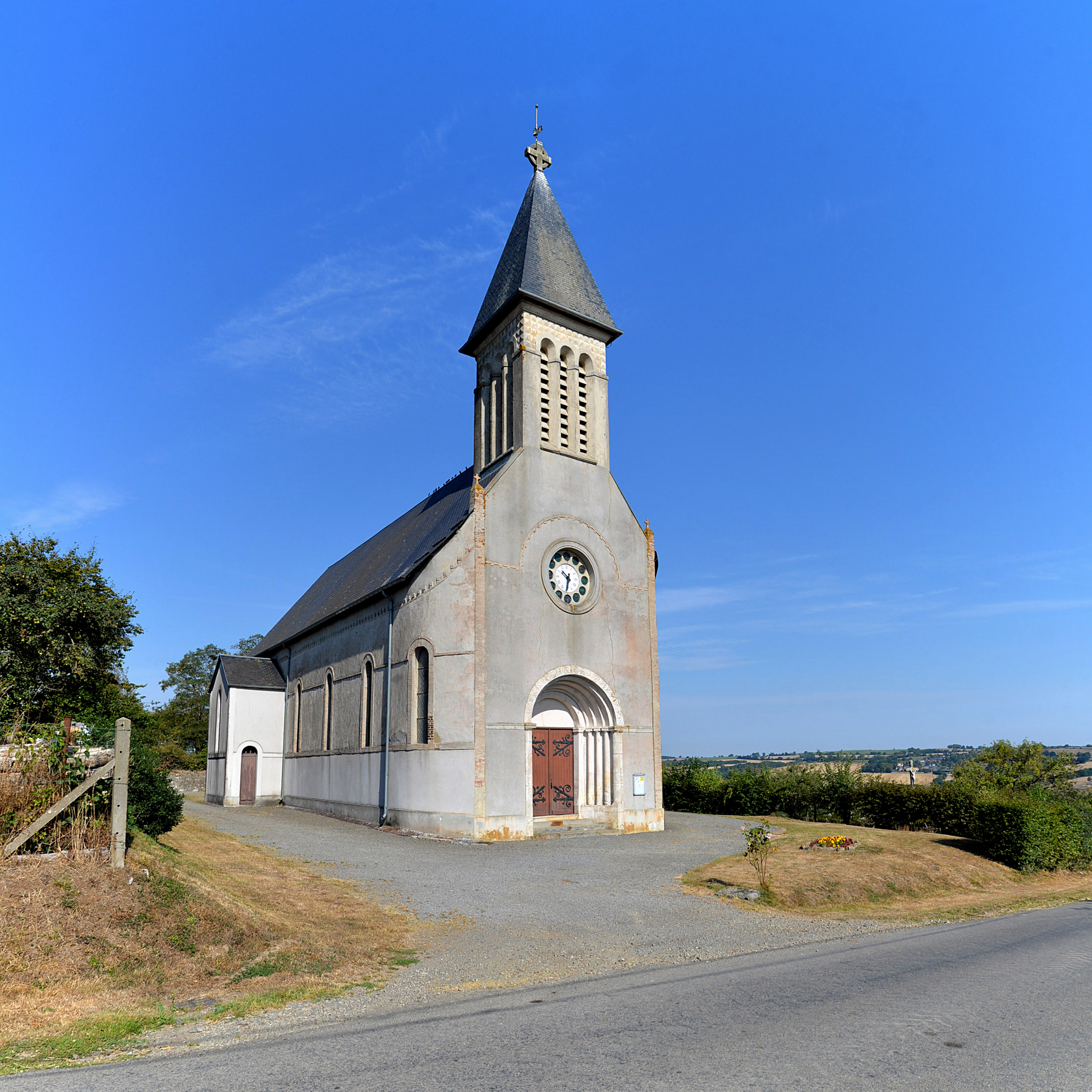
Church of Saint-Pierre in Cahan

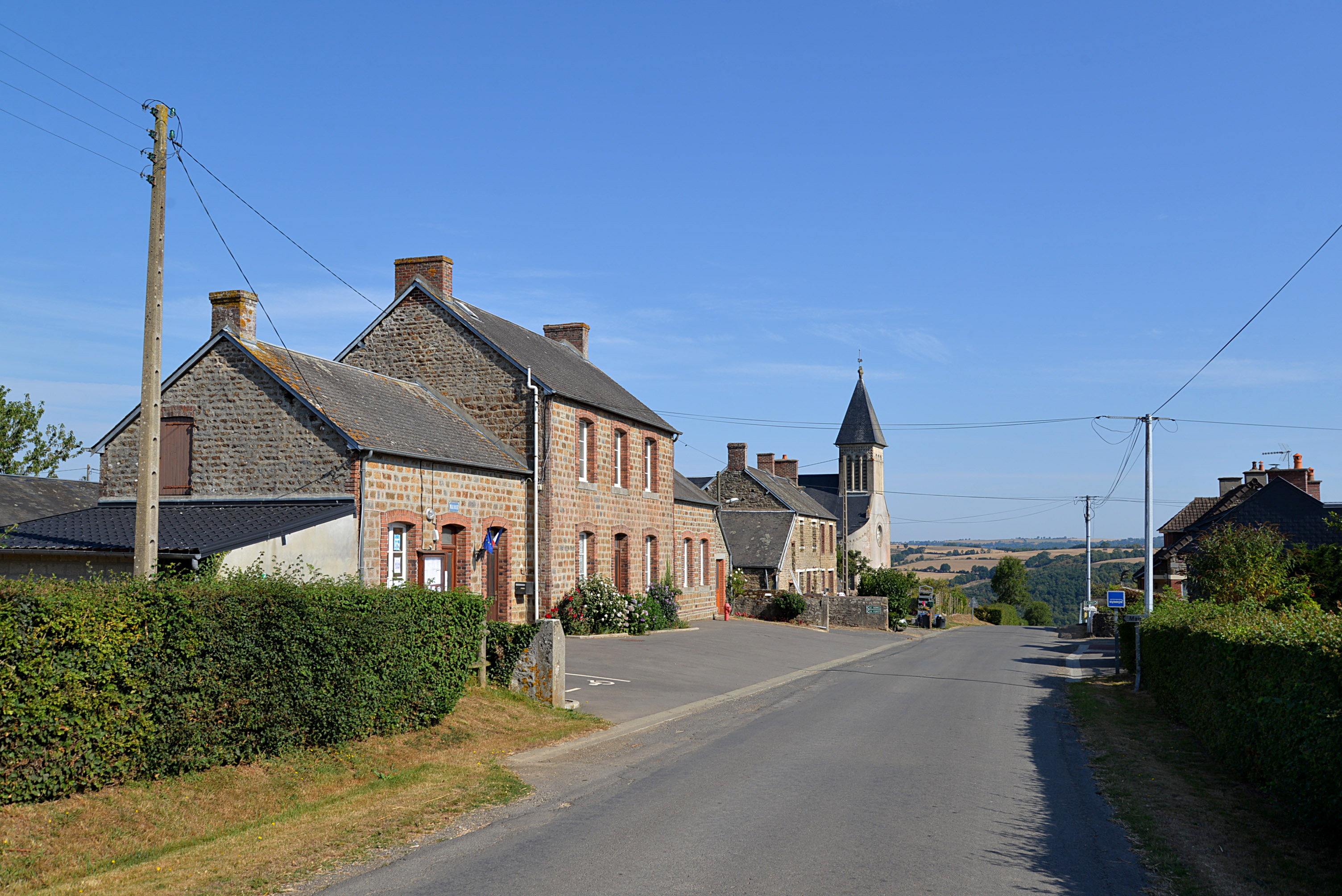
Cahan village

== See also ==
- Communes of the Orne department
