= Vallée de l'Orne et ses affluents =

Vallée de l'Orne et ses affluents translated as Orne Valley and tributaries is a Natura 2000 conservation area that is 2,115 hectares in size.

== Geography ==
The area is focused on Orne and 3 of its main tributaries, the laize, the Noireau and the Rouvre, as they flow through the different landscapes of Norman Switzerland. These landscapes range from deep gorges, torrential or slow-flowing rivers, wet meadows, alluvial forests, escarpments, scree slopes, siliceous ledges, enclosed woods and hedgerows.

It is spread across 21 different communes all within the departments of Orne and calvados;

1. Athis-Val de Rouvre
2. Berjou
3. Bretteville-sur-Laize
4. Le Bô
5. Cahan
6. Clécy
7. Cossesseville
8. Fresney-le-Puceux
9. Les Isles-Bardel
10. Ménil-Hermei
11. Ménil-Hubert-sur-Orne
12. Le Mesnil-Villement
13. Pierrefitte-en-Cinglais
14. Pont-d'Ouilly
15. Putanges-le-Lac
16. Rapilly
17. Saint-Denis-de-Méré
18. Saint-Omer
19. Saint-Philbert-sur-Orne
20. Saint-Rémy
21. Le Vey

== Conservation ==
The conservation area has seventeen species listed in Annex 2 of the Habitats Directive;

1. Eurasian otter
2. European bullhead
3. Cottus perifretum
4. Brook lamprey
5. Sea lamprey
6. Atlantic salmon
7. White-clawed crayfish
8. Freshwater pearl mussel
9. Jersey tiger
10. Western barbastelle
11. Greater horseshoe bat
12. Lesser horseshoe bat
13. Geoffroy's bat
14. Bechstein's bat
15. Greater mouse-eared bat
16. European stag beetle
17. Orange-spotted emerald

In addition the Natura 2000 site has eighteen habitats protected under the Habitats Directive.
