= Pierrefitte-en-Cinglais =

- Commune
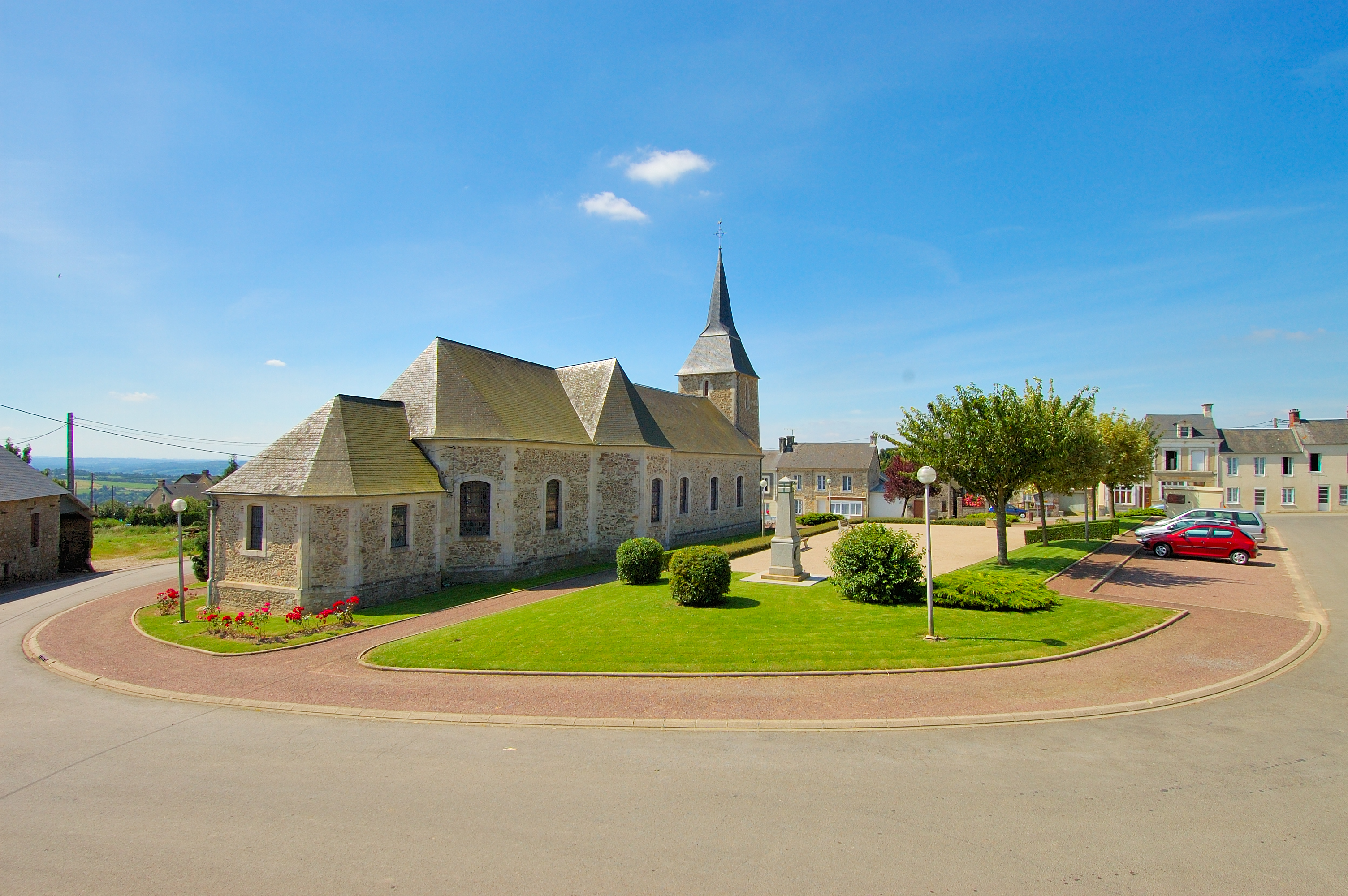
- The church in Pierrefitte-en-Cinglais
- Location of Pierrefitte-en-Cinglais
- Location within France Location within Normandy
- Coordinates: 48°54′14″N 0°23′12″W
- Country: France
- Region: Normandy
- Department: Calvados
- Arrondissement: Caen
- Canton: Falaise
- Intercommunality: Pays de Falaise

Government
  - Mayor (2020–2026): Samuel Courvallet
- Area^{1}: 10.72 km^{2} (4.14 sq mi)
- Elevation: 245 m (804 ft)
- Highest elevation: 300 m (980 ft)
- Lowest elevation: 43 m (141 ft)
- Population (2023): 237
  - Density: 22.1/km^{2} (57.3/sq mi)
- Time zone: UTC+01:00 (CET)
  - Summer (DST): UTC+02:00 (CEST)
- INSEE/Postal code: 14501 /14690
- ^{1} French Land Register data, which excludes lakes, ponds, glaciers > 1 km^{2} (0.386 sq mi or 247 acres) and river estuaries.

Pierrefitte-en-Cinglais (French pronunciation: [pjɛʁfit ɑ̃ sɛ̃ɡlɛ]) is a commune in the Calvados department in the Normandy region in northwestern France.

== Geography ==
The commune is part of the area known as Suisse Normande.

The commune is made up of the following collection of villages and hamlets, La Boissaye, Le Tilleul and Pierrefitte-en-Cinglais.

The Commune with another 20 communes shares part of a 2,115 hectare, Natura 2000 conservation area, called the Vallée de l'Orne et ses affluents.

The commune has six streams running through it The Langot, The Grand Etang, The Orival, The Val la Here, La Mesliere and La Vallee des Vaux.

The town lies 13 miles from the foot of the hill St. Clair, which rises to 306 meters.

== Population ==
Historical population
Year	Pop.	±% p.a.
1968	305	—
1975	279	−1.26%
1982	285	+0.30%
1990	237	−2.28%
1999	233	−0.19%
2007	246	+0.68%
2012	270	+1.88%
2017	257	−0.98%
2023	237	−1.34%
Source: INSEE

== See also ==
- Communes of the Calvados department
