= Le Bô =

- Commune
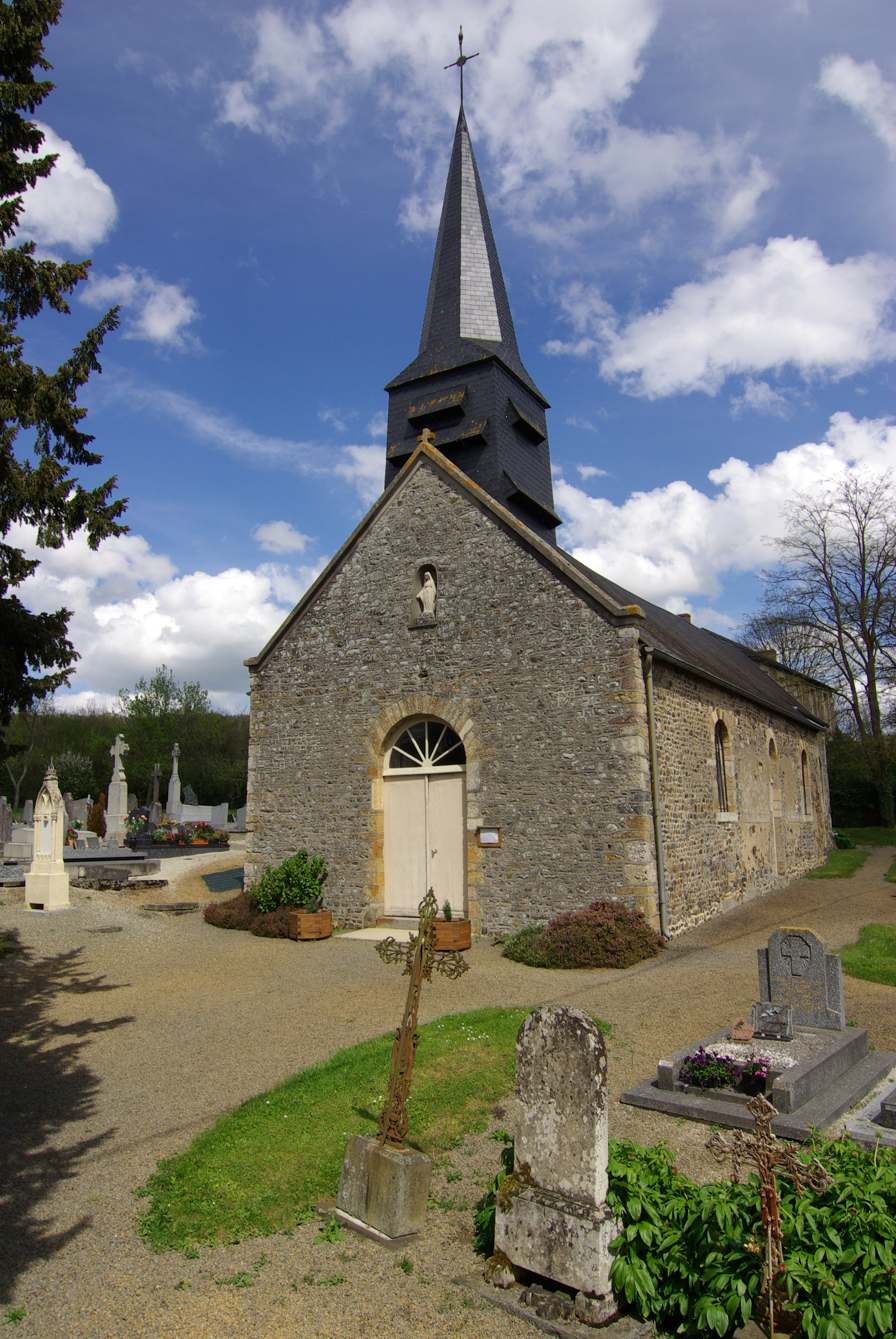
- Pont de la Bataille
- Location of Le Bô
- Location within France Location within Normandy
- Coordinates: 48°53′53″N 0°27′08″W
- Country: France
- Region: Normandy
- Department: Calvados
- Arrondissement: Caen
- Canton: Le Hom
- Intercommunality: Cingal-Suisse Normande

Government
  - Mayor (2024–2026): Paul Chatelais
- Area^{1}: 3.9 km^{2} (1.5 sq mi)
- Elevation: 60 m (200 ft)
- Highest elevation: 273 m (896 ft)
- Lowest elevation: 37 m (121 ft)
- Population (2023): 117
  - Density: 30/km^{2} (78/sq mi)
- Time zone: UTC+01:00 (CET)
  - Summer (DST): UTC+02:00 (CEST)
- INSEE/Postal code: 14080 /14690
- ^{1} French Land Register data, which excludes lakes, ponds, glaciers > 1 km^{2} (0.386 sq mi or 247 acres) and river estuaries.

Le Bô (French pronunciation: [lə bo]) is a commune in the Calvados department in the Normandy region in northwestern France.

== Geography ==
The commune is part of the area known as Suisse Normande.

The commune is made up of the following collection of villages and hamlets, Le Corps du Sel, Le Chesnay, Mainbœuf and Le Bô.

The Commune with another 20 communes shares part of a 2,115 hectare, Natura 2000 conservation area, called the Vallée de l'Orne et ses affluents.

The river Orne is the only watercourse that flows through the commune.

== Population ==
Historical population
Year	Pop.	±% p.a.
1968	99	—
1975	102	+0.43%
1982	102	+0.00%
1990	92	−1.28%
1999	100	+0.93%
2007	108	+0.97%
2012	104	−0.75%
2017	116	+2.21%
2023	117	+0.14%
Source: INSEE

== See also ==
- Communes of the Calvados department
