= Sainte-Croix-sur-Orne =

- Part of Putanges-le-Lac
- Location of Sainte-Croix-sur-Orne
- Location within France Location within Normandy
- Coordinates: 48°46′47″N 0°17′26″W
- Country: France
- Region: Normandy
- Department: Orne
- Arrondissement: Argentan
- Canton: Athis-de-l'Orne
- Commune: Putanges-le-Lac
- Area^{1}: 3.81 km^{2} (1.47 sq mi)
- Elevation: 173 m (568 ft)
- Highest elevation: 231 m (758 ft)
- Lowest elevation: 121 m (397 ft)
- Population (2022): 76
  - Density: 20/km^{2} (52/sq mi)
- Time zone: UTC+01:00 (CET)
  - Summer (DST): UTC+02:00 (CEST)
- Postal code: 61210
- ^{1} French Land Register data, which excludes lakes, ponds, glaciers > 1 km^{2} (0.386 sq mi or 247 acres) and river estuaries.

Sainte-Croix-sur-Orne (French pronunciation: [sɛ̃t kʁwa syʁ ɔʁn], literally Sainte-Croix on Orne) is a former commune in the Orne department in north-western France. On 1 January 2016, it was merged into the new commune of Putanges-le-Lac. The 18th-century military, playwright and physician Guillaume-René Lefébure (1744–1806) was born in Sainte-Croix-sur-Orne.

The former commune is part of the area known as Suisse Normande.

== See also ==
- Communes of the Orne department
