= Jean Vauquelin de la Fresnaye =

French poet

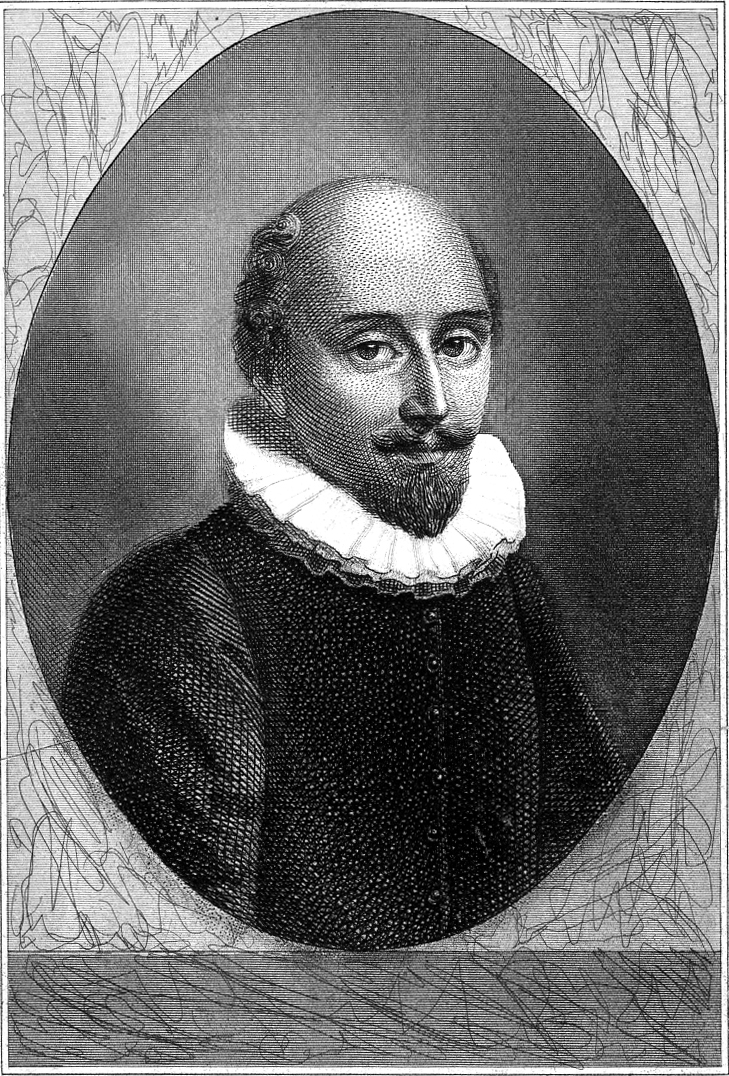
- Engraving by Charles Devrits
- Born: ca. 1536; La Fresnaye-au-Sauvage or Caen
- Died: ca. 1606/8; Caen
- Citizenship: France
- Occupation: Poet
- Children: Nicolas Vauquelin des Yveteaux
- Writing career
- Language: French

Jean Vauquelin de la Fresnaye (or de La Fresnaye) (1536–1606/8) was a French poet born at the château of La Fresnaye-au-Sauvage or Caen in Normandy in 1536.

He studied the humanities at Paris and law at Poitiers and Bourges. He fought in the Wars of Religion under the maréchal de Matignon and was wounded at the siege of Saint-Lô (1574). Most of his life was spent at Caen, where he was president, and he died there in 1608. He was the owner of the Chateau des Yveteaux in Les Yveteaux.

La Fresnaye was a disciple of Ronsard, but, while praising the reforms of the Pléiade he laid stress on the continuity of French literary history. He was a student of the trouvères and the old chroniclers, and desired to see French poetry set on a national basis. These views he expounded in an Art poetique, begun at the desire of Henry III in 1574, but not published until 1605.

His Forestries appeared in 1555; his Diverses poésies, including the Art poétique, the Satyres françoises, addressed to various distinguished contemporaries, and the Idylles, with some epigrams and sonnets, appeared in 1605. Among his political writings in the context of the civil wars may be noted Pour la monarchie du royaume contre la division (1569).
