= Nicolas Vauquelin des Yveteaux =

French poet

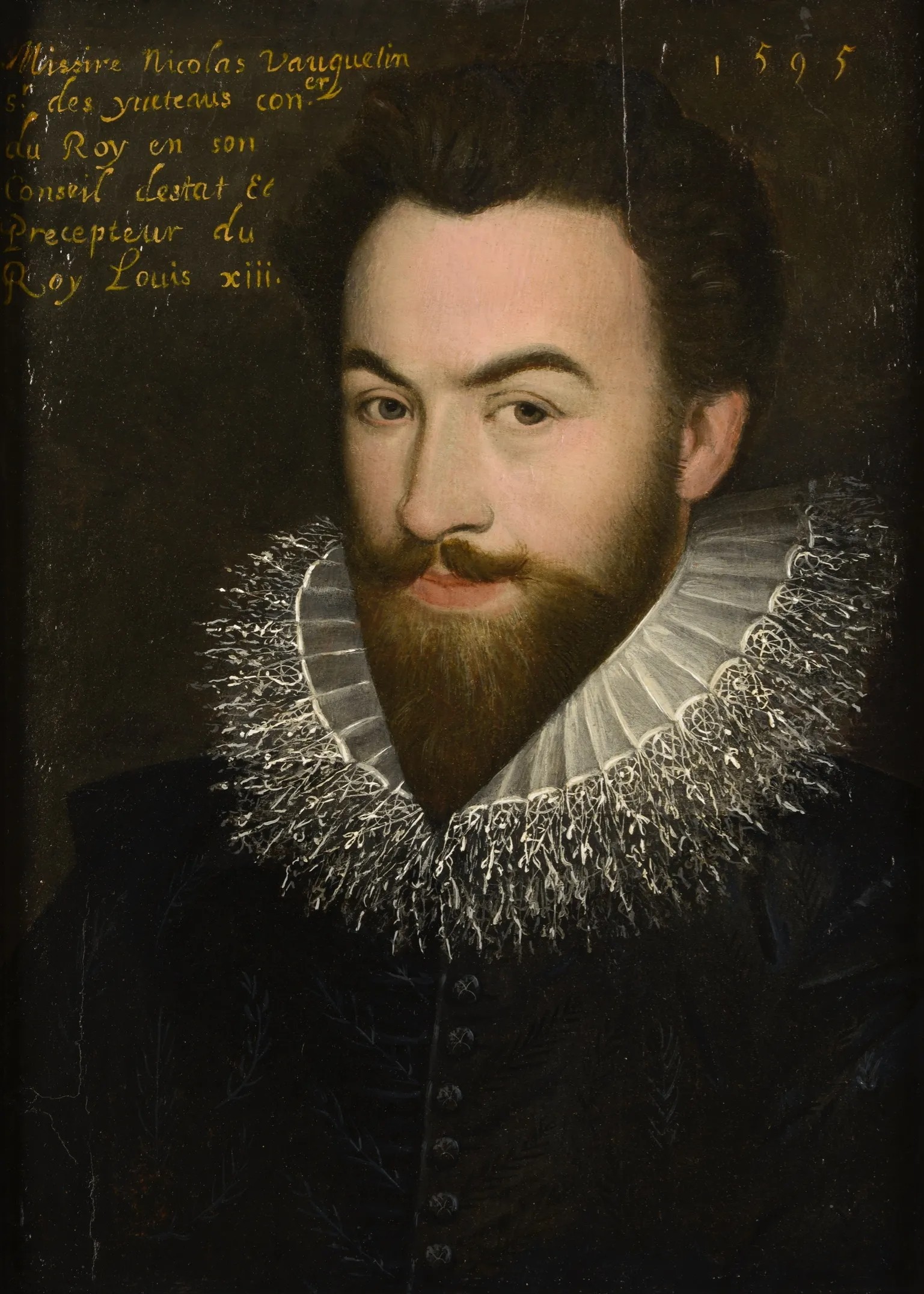
- Portrait of Nicolas Vauquelin des Yveteaux, 1595
- Born: 1567; Falaise, Province of Normandy, France
- Died: 9 March 1649 (aged 81); Paris, France
- Resting place: Église Saint-Arnould,Île-de-France
- Known for: Poet
- Parent: Jean Vauquelin de la Fresnaye

Nicolas Vauquelin des Yveteaux (1567–1649) was a French libertine poet, the son of Jean Vauquelin de la Fresnaye. He was born at the château de La Fresnaye in Falaise.
