= La Fresnaye-au-Sauvage =

- Part of Putanges-le-Lac
- Location of La Fresnaye-au-Sauvage
- Location within France Location within Normandy
- Coordinates: 48°44′22″N 0°15′28″W
- Country: France
- Region: Normandy
- Department: Orne
- Arrondissement: Argentan
- Canton: Athis-de-l'Orne
- Commune: Putanges-le-Lac
- Area^{1}: 11.98 km^{2} (4.63 sq mi)
- Elevation: 258 m (846 ft)
- Highest elevation: 253 m (830 ft)
- Lowest elevation: 123 m (404 ft)
- Population (2022): 224
  - Density: 18.7/km^{2} (48.4/sq mi)
- Time zone: UTC+01:00 (CET)
  - Summer (DST): UTC+02:00 (CEST)
- Postal code: 61210
- ^{1} French Land Register data, which excludes lakes, ponds, glaciers > 1 km^{2} (0.386 sq mi or 247 acres) and river estuaries.

La Fresnaye-au-Sauvage (French pronunciation: [la fʁɛnɛ o sovaʒ]) is a former commune in the Orne department in north-western France. On 1 January 2016, it was merged into the new commune of Putanges-le-Lac.

The former commune is part of the area known as Suisse Normande.

== See also ==
- Communes of the Orne department
