= Rabodanges =

- Part of Putanges-le-Lac
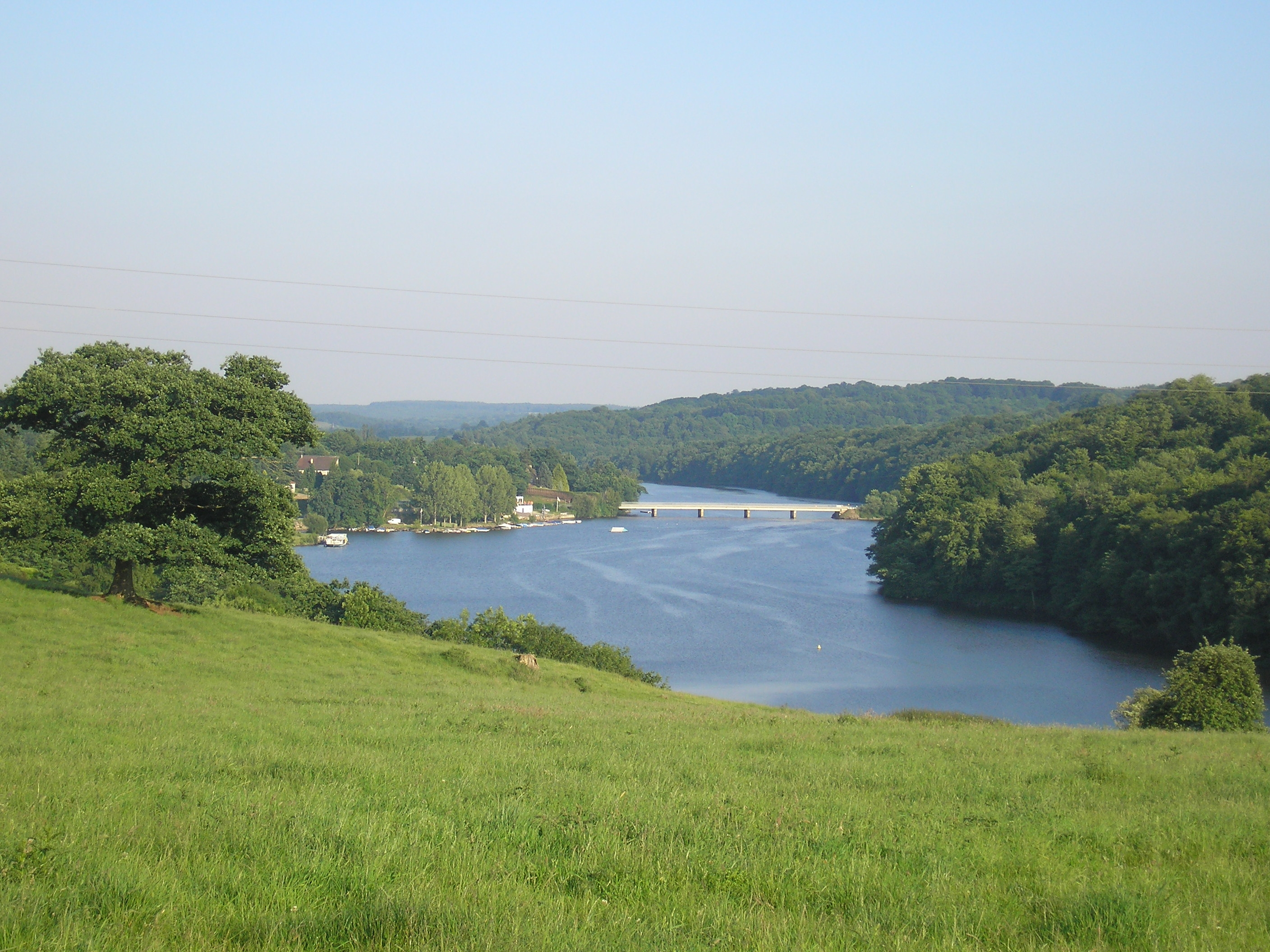
- Rabodanges lake on the river Orne
- Location of Rabodanges
- Location within France Location within Normandy
- Coordinates: 48°48′02″N 0°16′56″W
- Country: France
- Region: Normandy
- Department: Orne
- Arrondissement: Argentan
- Canton: Athis-de-l'Orne
- Commune: Putanges-le-Lac
- Area^{1}: 9.32 km^{2} (3.60 sq mi)
- Highest elevation: 241 m (791 ft)
- Lowest elevation: 70 m (230 ft)
- Population (2022): 174
  - Density: 18.7/km^{2} (48.4/sq mi)
- Time zone: UTC+01:00 (CET)
  - Summer (DST): UTC+02:00 (CEST)
- Postal code: 61210
- ^{1} French Land Register data, which excludes lakes, ponds, glaciers > 1 km^{2} (0.386 sq mi or 247 acres) and river estuaries.

Rabodanges (French pronunciation: [ʁabɔdɑ̃ʒ]) is a former commune in the Orne department of the Normandy region of north-western France. On 1 January 2016, it was merged into the new commune of Putanges-le-Lac.

The former commune is part of the area known as Suisse Normande.

== History ==
The former name of the parish was "Culley-sur-Orne" (until 1650).

The name "Rabodanges" is a corruption of "Rabodinghes" — a fief situated in Artois close to Saint-Omer — from where the manorial family which also owned the land of Culley-sur-Orne originated; the title of nobility was raised to "Marquis de Rabodanges" by King Louis XIV. The last representative of this family, established in Normandy since the 16th century, died without issue in 1792.

== Demography ==
Historical population
Year	Pop.	±% p.a.
1962	250	—
1968	217	−2.33%
1975	170	−3.43%
1982	168	−0.17%
1990	149	−1.49%
1999	157	+0.58%
2006	167	+0.89%
2022	174	+0.26%
Source: EHESS and INSEE

== Places of interest ==
- Its chateau built in the classical style (open for visits)
- Rabodanges is also known for its lake, on which one can water-ski.

== See also ==
- Communes of the Orne department
- Robert Bordet, a Norman adventurer, born in Rabodanges, who acquired the county of Tarragona (Spain) in 1129.
