= La Forêt-Auvray =

- Part of Putanges-le-Lac
- Location of La Forêt-Auvray
- Location within France Location within Normandy
- Coordinates: 48°48′44″N 0°20′28″W
- Country: France
- Region: Normandy
- Department: Orne
- Arrondissement: Argentan
- Canton: Athis-de-l'Orne
- Commune: Putanges-le-Lac
- Area^{1}: 10.96 km^{2} (4.23 sq mi)
- Elevation: 235 m (771 ft)
- Highest elevation: 251 m (823 ft)
- Lowest elevation: 65 m (213 ft)
- Population (2022): 168
  - Density: 15.3/km^{2} (39.7/sq mi)
- Time zone: UTC+01:00 (CET)
  - Summer (DST): UTC+02:00 (CEST)
- Postal code: 61210
- ^{1} French Land Register data, which excludes lakes, ponds, glaciers > 1 km^{2} (0.386 sq mi or 247 acres) and river estuaries.

La Forêt-Auvray (French pronunciation: [la fɔʁɛ ovʁɛ]) is a former commune in the Orne department in north-western France. On 1 January 2016, it was merged into the new commune of Putanges-le-Lac. It is located about 200 km west of Paris, 45 km south of Caen, 55 km north-west of Alençon.

The former commune is part of the area known as Suisse Normande.

== See also ==
- Communes of the Orne department
