= Guillaume-René Lefébure =

French military man, historian, physician and writer (1744-1809)

- Born: 25 September 1744; Sainte-Croix-sur-Orne
- Died: 27 July 1809 (aged 64); Augsbourg
- Occupations: Military; Historian; Physician

Guillaume-René Lefébure, baron de Saint-Ildephont (25 September 1744 – 27 July 1809) was an 18th–19th-century French military, historian, physician, political writer and man of letters.

== Biography ==
The son of a nobleman, Lefébure de Saint-Ildephont entered the company of chevau-légers of the king's house in 1769, but his taste leading him to the study of natural science, he left military service and got admitted to a medical doctor and became a doctor of the city of Versailles. He undertook research on venereal disease and the organ of sight.

After returning from several trips to Holland and Germany, he was appointed physician of the Count of Provence in 1785. At the outbreak of the Revolution, he emigrated and traveled to Holland Germany and Italy, while continuing to practice medicine. Returning to France in 1801, his views brought him into conflict with the government and he expatriated himself again on his way to Munich, Augsburg and Frankfurt am Main.

On 8 May 1809, Lefébure was appointed chief doctor of the hospital of Augsburg. When the French army crowd of casualties was brought in this city after the Battle of Regensburg and the Battle of Essling, in his zeal to cure his unfortunate compatriots, he caught typhus, which prevailed. It is said that to a priest having come to assist him in his last moments, Lefebure replied: "My dear Father, tell who you want you confessed me, I give you permission, but in the name of God, let me die in peace."

Lefébure de Saint-Ildephont published a host of writings on various subjects including plays such as les Orphelins comedy in three acts and in prose (Geneva, 1771), Sophie, ou le triomphe de la vertu, comedy in five acts and in prose (Stockholm, 1771; Avignon, 1791), le Connaisseur, comedy in three acts and in verse (Geneva and Paris, 1773), reprinted under the name M. de Fintac, or le faux Connaisseur, comédie par l’aveugle de Ferney (Geneva, 1774), Polixène, tragedy in five acts and in vers (Utrecht, 1785), l’Art de régner, poem presented at the competition of the Académie des Jeux floraux (Lausanne, 1773).

He also published historical works such as Itinéraire historique, politique, géographique Provinces-Unies (The Hague, 1781), works of medicine like Médecin de soi-même, ou méthode simple pour guérir les maladies vénériennes, avec un chocolat aphrodisiaque aussi utile qu’agréable (Paris, 1775), Lettre au sujet d’un rouge à l’usage des dames, tiré du règne végétal (Paris, 1775), Remède éprouvé pour guérir les cancer occulte et manifeste ou ulcéré (Paris, 1775), État de la médecine, chirurgie et pharmacie en Europe, et principalement en France, pour l’année 1777 (Paris, 1777), le Manuel des femmes enceintes, de celles qui sont en couches, et de celles qui veulent nourrir (Paris, 1777, 1782, 1797), Mémoires cliniques sur les maladies vénériennes (Utrecht, 1781), Observations pratiques, rares et curieuses sur divers accidents vénériens (Paris, 1775), République fondée sur la nature physique et morale de l’homme (Nuremberg, 1797), le Guide des personnes de l’un et l’autre sexe qui sont affligées de hernies ou descentes, ou instruction sur l’usage des bandages herniaires guérissants et de la liqueur styptiques pour la guérison radicale des hernies (Frankfurt am Main, 1798), Recherches et découvertes sur la nature du fluide nerveux ou de l’esprit vital, principe de la vie, et sur sa manière d’agir, d’après des expériences neuves et exactes (Frankfurt am Main, 1800), Traité sur la paralysie du nerf optique, vulgairement nommé goutte sereine, au traitement de laquelle on applique le gaz hydrogène (Paris, 1801), Histoire anatomique, physiologique et optique de l’œil, pour servir d’introduction aux autres ouvrages sur les maladies et les opérations des yeux, du même auteur, et d’examen à ceux qui se destinent à cette pratique (Strasbourg and Paris, 1803) and two books in German on venereal diseases and ocular disorders.

== Works ==
- 1781–1782 Itinéraire historique, politique, géographique, &c. des VII Provinces-Unies des Pays-Bas, de leur territoire et colonies : enrichi de cartes, La Haye, Veuve Staatman et C. Plaat.
- 1778: Sophie, ou Le triomphe de la vertu : comédie en cinq actes, et en prose, Paris, Didot l'aîné.
- 1771: Les Orphelins, drama, Geneva, Les Frères associés.
- 1785: Polixène, tragedy in five acts and in verse, Utrecht, B. Wild.
- 1773: L'Art de régner, Lausanne; Paris, d'Houry.
- 1775: Le Médecin de soi-même, ou méthode simple : pour guérir les maladies vénériennes, avec la recette d'un chocolat aphrodisiaque, Paris, Lambert.
- 1800: Recherches et découvertes sur la nature du fluide nerveux : ou de l'esprit-vital, principe de la vie, et sur sa manière d'agir d'après des expériences neuves et exactes, Paris, A. Koenig.
- 1789: Sichere, leichte und auf Erfahrung gegründete Art sich selbst ohne große Kosten und ohne Hülfe eines Arztes von den verschiedenen Arten der Gonorrhöe oder dem Tripper zu heilen, für das männliche und weibliche Geschlecht : nebst den venerischen Rezepten und des Neuerfundenen antivenerischen Mittels, Iéna, Melchiors Erben.
- 1800–1801: Sichere und kurze Heilart aller Augenentzündungen mit einer Darstellung der Eigenschaften und des Gebrauch der Augensalbe, Francfort; Hambourg, chez l'auteur.

== Sources ==
- Jean Chrétien Ferdinand Hoefer, Nouvelle biographie universelle, Paris, Didot, 1858, (p. 302–3)
- Jean-Eugène Dezeimeris, Dictionnaire historique de la médecine ancienne et moderne, Paris, Béchet, 1836, (p. 420–1)
