= Guerin =

Guerin or Guérin may refer to:

== People ==
=== Surname ===
==== Actors and dancers ====
- Bruce Guerin (1919–2012), American child actor
- Florence Guérin (born 1965), French actress
- François Guérin (1927–2003), French actor
- Isabelle Guérin (born 1961), French ballet dancer
- Lucy Guerin (born 1961), Australian dancer and choreographer
- Maude Guérin (born 1965), Canadian film and television actress
- Roger Guérin (1926–2010), French musician and singer
- Theodosia Stirling (1815–1904), known as Mrs. Guerin, Australian actor and singer

==== Artists ====
- Charles-François-Prosper Guérin (1875–1939), French post-impressionist painter
- Christophe Guérin (1758–1831), French engraver and painter
- Emmanuel Guérin (1884–1967), French sculptor
- François Guérin (artist) (1717–1801), French miniaturist, draughtsman and artist
- Gabriel-Christophe Guérin (1790-1846), Bavarian painter
- Gilles Guérin (1611–1678), French sculptor
- Jean Michel Prosper Guérin (1838–after 1912), French painter
- Jean-Baptiste Paulin Guérin (1783–1855), French painter
- Jean-Urbain Guérin (1760–1836), French draughtsman and miniaturist
- Jules Guérin (artist) (1866–1946), American painter
- Pierre-Narcisse Guérin (1774–1833), French painter

==== Doctors and scientists ====
- Alphonse Guérin (1816–1895), French surgeon
- Camille Guérin (1872–1961), French immunologist
- Félix Édouard Guérin-Méneville (1799–1874), French entomologist
- Victor Guérin (1821–1891), French intellectual, explorer and amateur archaeologist

==== Journalists ====
- Didier Guérin (born 1950), Franco-Australian magazine media executive
- Orla Guerin (born 1960), Irish journalist
- Robert Guérin (1876–1952), French journalist and 1st President of FIFA
- Veronica Guerin (1958–1996), Irish journalist

==== Military figures ====
- Elsa Jane Forest Guerin (fl. 1860s), American Civil War figure
- Fitz W. Guerin (1846–1903), American photographer and Medal of Honor recipient
- Gabriel Guérin (1892–1918), French pilot in World War I
- Hubert Guerin (1896–1986), French diplomat and military officer

==== Musicians and composers ====
- Beb Guérin (1941–1980), French jazz musician
- John Guerin (1939–2004), American drummer
- Mlle Guerin (born c. 1739, fl. 1755), French composer

==== Political figures and activists ====
- Bella Guerin (1858–1923), Australian feminist
- Daniel Guérin (1904–1988), French anarchist
- Gertrude Guerin (1917-1998), Canadian first nations chief
- James John Edmund Guerin (1856–1932), Canadian politician
- Jules Guérin (1860–1910), French journalist and anti-semitic activist
- Lionel Guérin (contemporary), French chief executive officer and politician
- Stacey Guerin (contemporary), American politician from Maine
- Thomas I. Guerin (1903–1956), American politician from Pennsylvania
- Yves Guérin-Sérac (1926–2022), French anti-communism activist

==== Religious figures ====
- Marie-Azélie Guérin (1831–1877), French Roman Catholic saint
- Pierre Guérin de Tencin (1679–1758), French ecclesiastic
- Théodore Guérin (1798–1856), French-American Roman Catholic saint

==== Sports figures ====
- Alexis Guérin (cyclist) (born 1992), French cyclist
- Bill Guerin (born 1970), American ice hockey player
- Daniel Guérin (table tennis) (fl. 1935–1936), French table tennis player
- Eric Guerin (1924–1993), American jockey
- Henri Guérin (footballer) (1921–1995), French footballer
- Henri Guérin (fencer) (1905–1967), French fencer
- Jim Guerin (1894–1918), Irish hurler
- Lina Guérin (born 1991), French rugby union player
- Maddy Guerin (born 1999), Australian rules footballer
- Richie Guerin (born 1932), American basketball player
- Paul-André Guérin (born 1997), French footballer
- Victor Guerin (racing driver) (born 1992), Brazilian racing driver
- Vincent Guérin (born 1965), French footballer

==== Writers, poets, filmmakers ====
- Eugénie de Guérin (1805–1848), French writer
- Hippolyte Guérin (1797–1861), French poet
- José Luis Guerín (born 1960), Spanish filmmaker
- Léon Guérin (1807–1885), French author and poet
- Maurice de Guérin (1810–1839), French poet
- Mona Guérin (1934–2011), Haitian writer for television and radio
- Paul Guérin (1830–1908), French priest, professor of philosophy, writer and encyclopedist
- Polly Guerin (died 2021), American writer

==== Other people ====
- Claudine Guérin de Tencin (1681–1749), French socialite
- Germaine Guérin, brothel owner and French Resistance sympathizer
- Héloïse Guérin (born 1989), French model
- Jacques Guérin-Desjardins (1894–1982), French scouting leader
- Michael Guerin, fictional character in the book Roswell High and television series Roswell
- Napoleon Guerin (fl. 1841), American inventor
- Vera Guerin (born c. 1947), American billionaire and philanthropist

=== Other names containing Guerin ===
- Guerin of Provence (died 845 or 856), French Count of Auvergne
- Guérin de Montaigu (died 1230), French crusader
- Guerin Spranger (born c. 1610), Dutch Jewish entrepreneur
- Guyon Guérin de Bouscal (1613–1657), French dramatist and novelist
- Petrus Guérin du Rocher (1731–1792), French Jesuit
- Robert Guérin du Rocher (1736–1792), French Jesuit
- Alice Guerin Crist (1876–1941), Australian poet, author and journalist
- Guerin Austin (born 1980), American television host, model and beauty queen

== Places ==
- Guérin, Quebec, a township municipality in Canada
- Guérin, Lot-et-Garonne, a commune in the Lot-et-Garonne department, France
- Guérin-Kouka, Dankpen, a city in Togo

== Other uses ==
- Guerin Sportivo, Italian sports magazine
- P. E. Guerin, American hardware company
