= Guérin-Kouka =

Guérin-Kouka may refer to:

- Guérin-Kouka, Bassar, a village in Togo
- Guérin-Kouka, Dankpen, a city in Togo

== See also ==
- Guerin (disambiguation)
- Kouka (disambiguation)
