= Dankpen Prefecture =

Prefecture of Kara region in Togo

Coordinates: 9°41′N 0°36′E

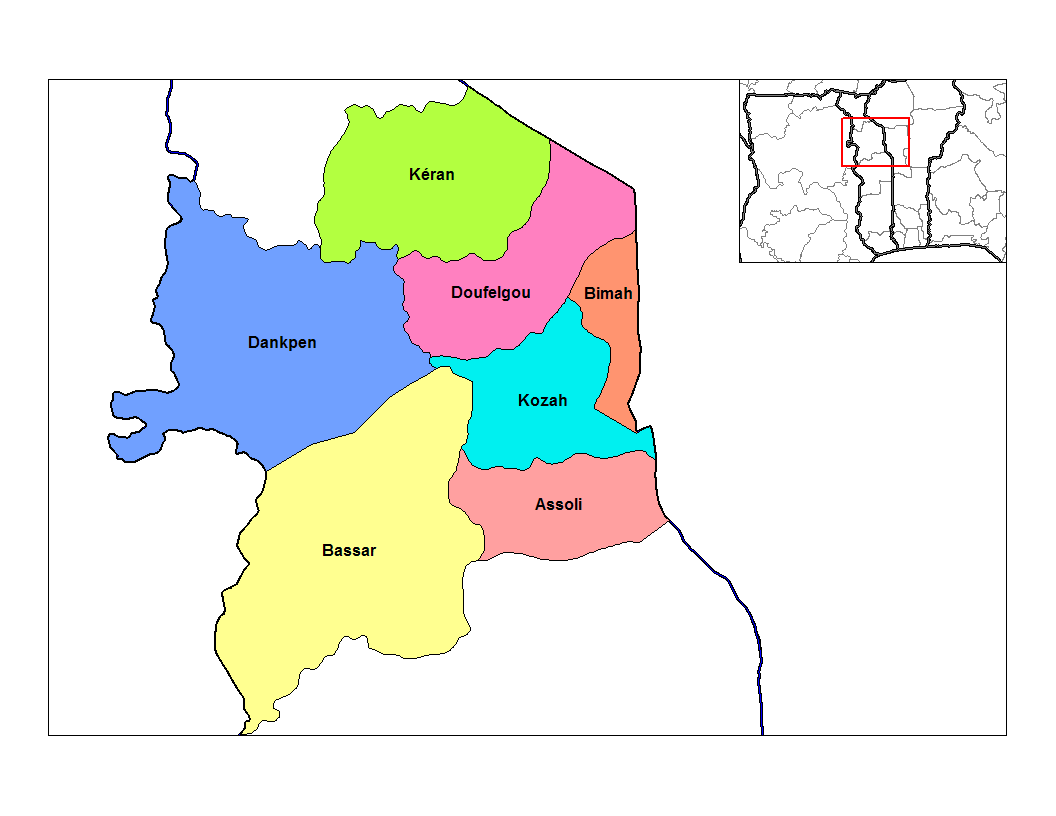
Prefectures of Kara

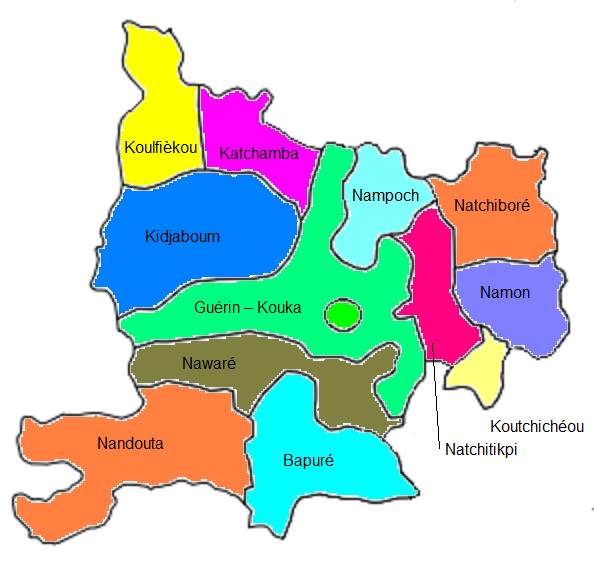
Cantons of Dankpen prefecture, Togo

Dankpen is a prefecture located in the Kara Region of Togo. The prefecture covers 2 690 km^{2}, with a population in 2022 of 185,662. The prefecture seat is located in Guérin-Kouka. It is split into 12 cantons, Guérin-Kouka, Bapuré, Nandouta, Kidjaboum, Namon, Nawaré, Katchamba, Nampoch, Natchiboré, Natchitikpi, Koulfièkou, and Koutchichéou.

== Environment ==
The climate is semi-humid tropical with wet season from June to October and dry season from November to May, notably characterised by the dry desert wind, the Harmattan. Rainfall is variable, with measurements in Guérin-Kouka of 1273 mm and 1494 mm recorded in 1950 and 1963 respectively. Relief was notably provided after the drought in 2013. Major rivers are the Oti River, which forms its western border, with Ghana, and the Kara River, its tributary, which forms the prefecture's northern border with the Savanes Region, Togo.

== Economy ==
Agriculture, livestock and commerce are the main economic activities. The major venue for trade is the Sunday market of Guérin-Kouka, with sellers from Kara Region, Centrale Region and Ghana. Other markets, with no fixed market day, include Namon, Possao, Koulfièkou, Katchamba, Kidjaboun, Nandouta, and Saboba in Ghana.

== Society ==
Main ethnicities include the Konkomba, Bassar, Mossi, Lamba, Tchokossi and Haoussa. The region is a particular centre for the Konkomba people, with their own language, who have a strong distinct identity. The Konkomba people are historically spread over parts of both Ghana and Togo. Dankpen was part of the Konkombia region in the German protectorate of Togoland from 1884, and subsequently part of French Togoland after partition in 1916. Following ethnic conflict in northern Ghana, a large proportion of Konkomba refugees have therefore preferred to remain in Togo. Efforts have been made to promote Konkomba culture and maintain traditional festivals. In 2014, the député for the Dankpen prefecture in the assemblée nationale, Sambiri Targone, had his parliamentary immunity revoked and was arrested following a range of allegations by the prefect of Dankpen, ex-Colonel Dadja Maganawè, partially involving on-going disputes with the Peules pastoral nomadic people. Within the region, the arrest was seen to be controversial and politically motivated, accompanied by counter-accusations of human rights abuses by the prefect.

Dankpen is in the meningitis belt, and has been the object of vaccination programs. Challenges affecting vaccination include low education and poor accessibility. In 2016, a major meningitis outbreak in Ghana and Togo particularly impacted Dankpen with 219 cases and 70 deaths (as of 4.3.2016).
