= Sainte-Honorine =

Sainte-Honorine (which refers to Saint Honorina) is part of the name of several communes in France:

- Conflans-Sainte-Honorine, in the Yvelines département
- Sainte-Honorine-de-Ducy, in the Calvados département
- Sainte-Honorine-des-Pertes, in the Calvados département
- Sainte-Honorine-du-Fay, in the Calvados département
- Sainte-Honorine-la-Chardonne, in the Orne département
- Sainte-Honorine-la-Guillaume, in the Orne département
