= Personal flotation device =

Equipment to help the wearer keep afloat in water

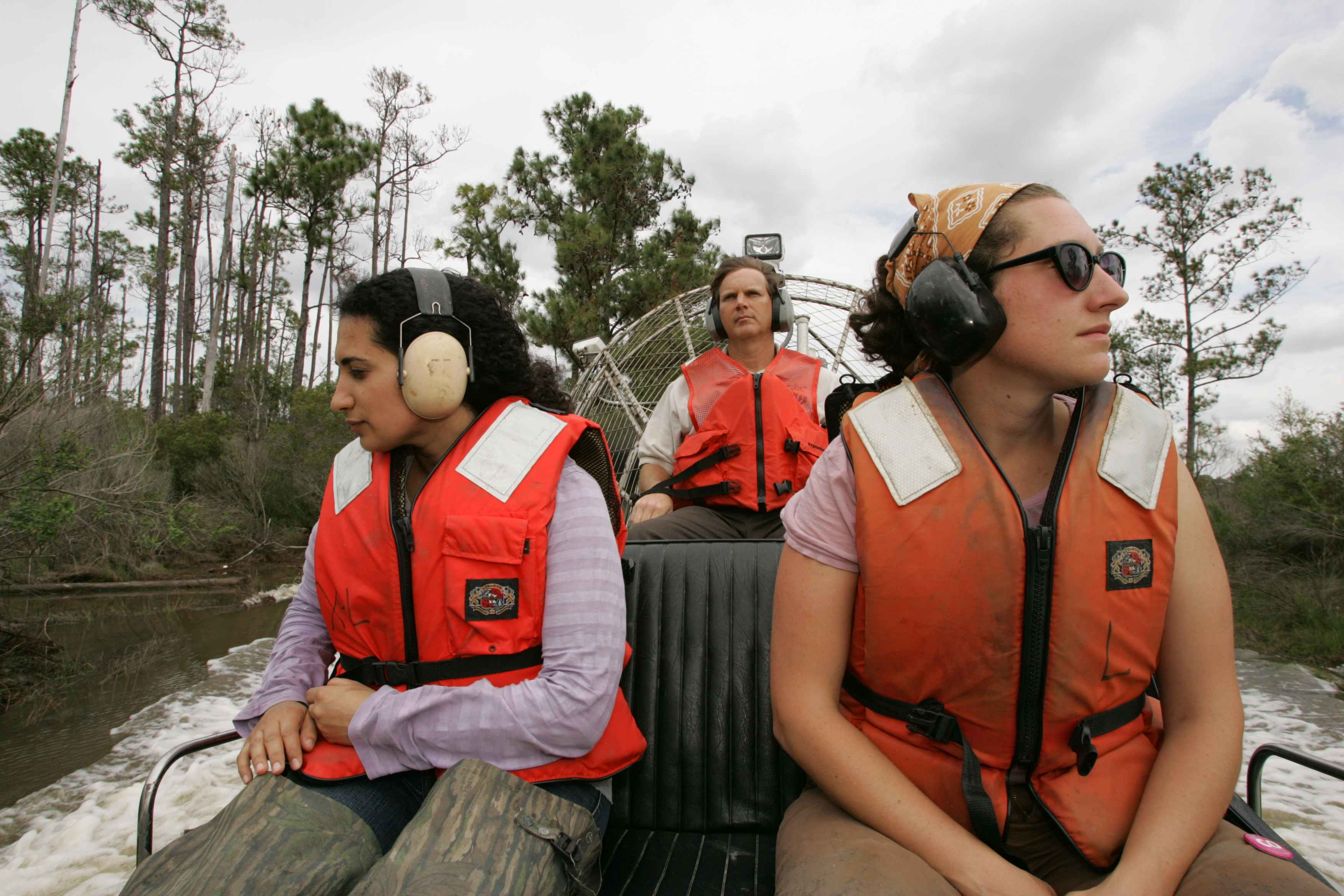
Personal flotation devices being worn on an air boat

A personal flotation device (PFD; also referred to as a life jacket, life preserver, life belt, Mae West, life vest, life saver, cork jacket, buoyancy aid or flotation suit) is a flotation device in the form of a vest or suit that is worn by a user to prevent the wearer from drowning in a body of water. The device will keep the wearer afloat with their head and mouth above the surface – they do not have to swim or tread water in order to stay afloat and can even be unconscious.

PFDs are commonly worn on small watercraft or other locations where accidental entry into deep water may occur in order to provide immediate support for the wearer should they end up in the water. PFDs are also kept on large vessels for passengers to wear in an emergency in order to help them stay afloat should they be forced to enter the water or accidentally fall overboard during an evacuation. PFDs are commonly worn for swimming and other activities that require an individual to be in water. This is for reasons such as safety (to prevent the drowning of weak swimmers, swimmers in dangerous conditions or swimmers far from safety), to make swimming easier and less demanding, to allow someone who is unable to swim to safely enter water, as assistance for activities such as water skiing.

PFDs are available in different sizes to accommodate variations in body weight. Designs differ depending on wearing convenience, the activities and conditions they are designed to be used in and the level of protection the wearer needs. There are three main types of PFDs: life jackets, buoyancy aids and survival suits; PFDs are most often constructed out of foam pieces, with the exception of some life jackets which are inflated with air. Other highly specialized forms of PFDs include buoyancy compensators used for scuba diving, and submarine escape devices.

== History ==
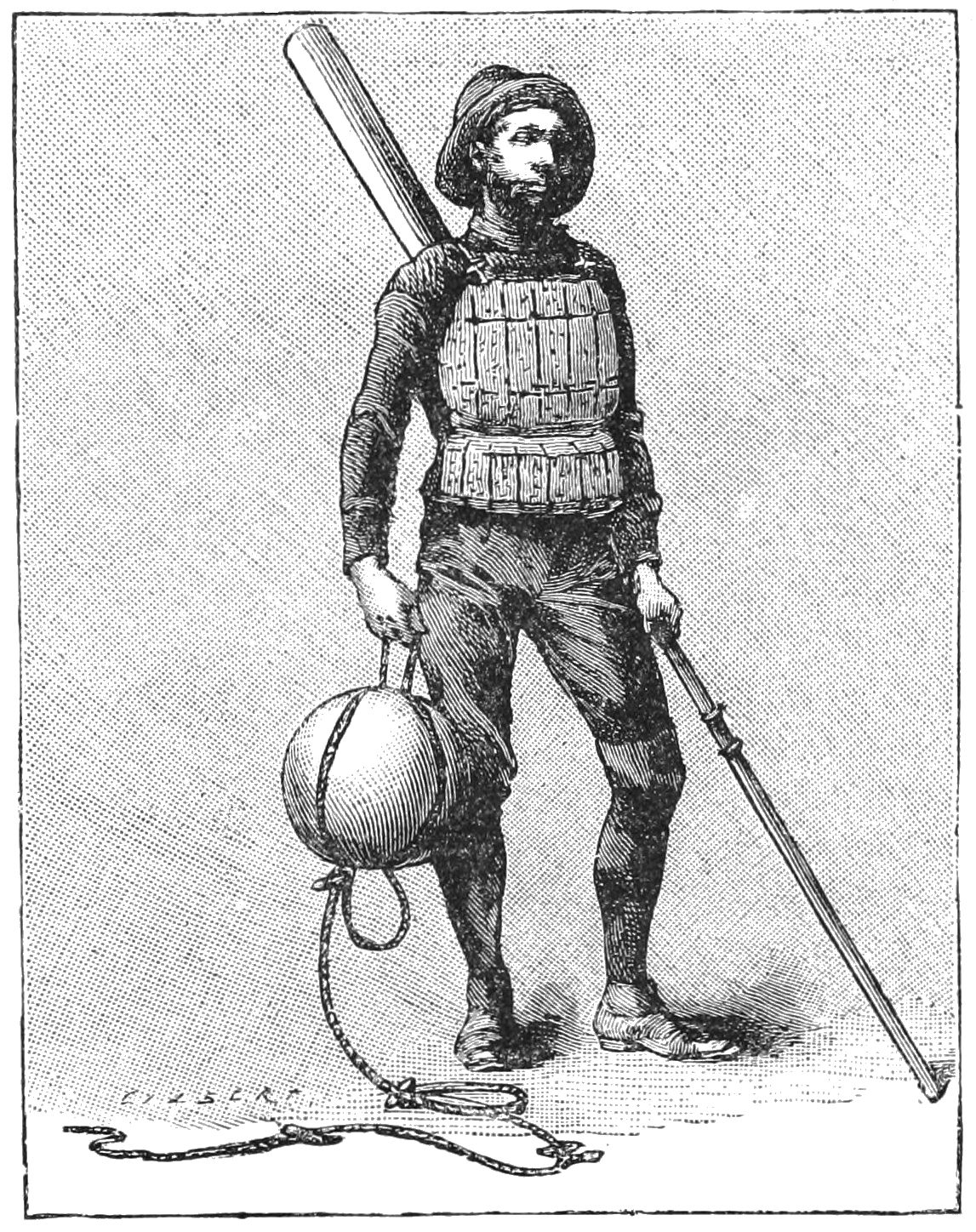
A typical cork jacket from 1887

The oldest examples of primitive life jackets can be traced back to inflated bladders, animal skins, or hollow sealed gourds for support when crossing deep streams and rivers. Purpose-designed buoyant safety devices consisting of simple blocks of wood or cork were used by Norwegian seamen.

In a letter to the Naval Chronicle, dated February 1802, Abraham Bosquet proposed issuing Royal Navy Ships with "strong canvas bags of dimensions, when filled with cork shavings, equal to about that of a bed bolster, coiled in manner like a collar, and sufficiently wide for the head and shoulders to pass through."

In 1804, a cork life jacket was available for sale in The Sporting Magazine.

In 1806, Francis Daniel, a physician working at Wapping, exhibited an inflatable life preserver, mounting a demonstration in which a number of suitably equipped men jumped into the Thames below Blackfriars Bridge, and variously played musical instruments, smoked pipes, discharged guns and drank wine, as the tide took them upstream. Daniel pursued his idea for some years, by his own account receiving a gold medal from the Royal Society of Arts after surrendering the idea to them.

Personal flotation devices were not part of the equipment issued to naval sailors until the early 19th century, for example at the Napoleonic Battle of Trafalgar, although seamen who were press-ganged into naval service might have used such devices to jump ship and swim to freedom.

Following the 1852 sinking of the troopship Birkenhead, Ensign G.A. Lucas of the 73rd Regiment of Foot wrote "Cornet Bond, 12th Lancers, was...the only person to have a lifejacket – a privately owned Macintosh Life Preserver and seems to have got ashore fairly easily."

It was not until lifesaving services were formed that the personal safety of lifeboat crews heading out in pulling boats in generally horrific sea conditions was addressed. The modern life jacket is generally credited to the Inspector of Lifeboats at the Royal National Lifeboat Institution in the UK, Captain John Ross Ward (later Vice Admiral of the Royal Navy). He created a brown cork vest in 1854 to be worn by lifeboat crews for both weather protection and buoyancy. They would be worn over the blue/grey waterproof oilskins. In 1900, French electrical engineer, Gustave Trouvé, patented a battery-powered wearable lifejacket. It incorporated small, rubber-insulated maritime electric batteries not only to inflate the jacket, but also to power a light to transmit and receive SOS messages and to launch a distress flare.

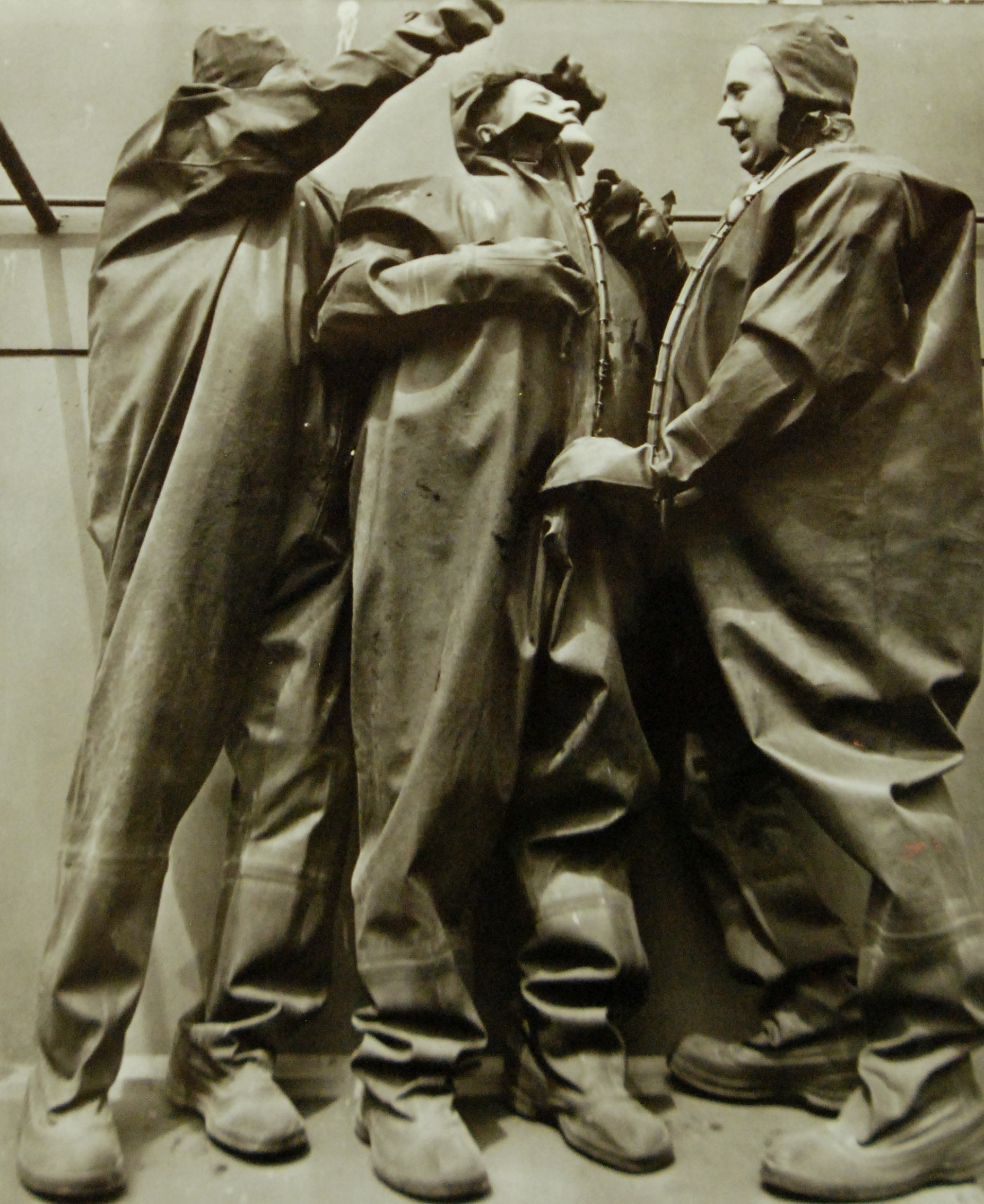
Men in brown kapok suits on Allied oil tanker during WWII

In 1904 the rigid cork material was supplanted by pouches containing watertight cells filled with kapok, a vegetable material. These soft cells were much more flexible and comfortable to wear compared with devices using hard cork pieces. Orpheus Beaumont created the Salvus life jacket which was approved by the British Board of Trade in 1918. Kapok buoyancy was used in many navies fighting in World War II. In 1972 yellow or red Beaufort synthetic foam life jackets supplanted kapok for 'inherently buoyant' (vs. inflated and therefore not inherently buoyant) flotation. These modern jackets could support not only the rescuer but the rescued at the same time.

The University of Victoria pioneered research and development of the UVic Thermo Float PFD, which provides superior protection from immersion hypothermia by incorporating a neoprene rubber "diaper" that seals the user's upper thigh and groin region from contact with otherwise cold, flushing and debilitating water.

During World War II, research to improve the design of life jackets was also conducted in the UK by Edgar Pask, the first Professor of Anaesthesia at Newcastle University. His research involved self-administered anaesthesia as a means of simulating unconsciousness in freezing sea-water. Pask's work earned him the OBE and the description of "the bravest man in the RAF never to have flown an aeroplane".

=== M1926 Inflatable Life Preserver Belt ===
The M1926 Life Preserver belt was issued to US infantry where they were on ships or near the water, in particular amphibious landings such as D-Day. The belt had two CO_{2} bottles that could be activated to inflate the belt if needed, or it could be blown up manually with a tube, if the CO_{2} bottles failed.

=== Admiralty Pattern 14124 inflatable life ring ===
The Admiralty Pattern 14124 inflatable life ring was the main life preserver issued to British sailors at the start of World War II. It provided about 8.5 pounds (38 N) of buoyancy. Its inherent flaw, and an issue with many life preservers at the time, was that it did not keep the wearer's head back out of the water while they were floating. This meant if they went unconscious they would roll forward and end up face down in the water and drown.

=== Mae West ===
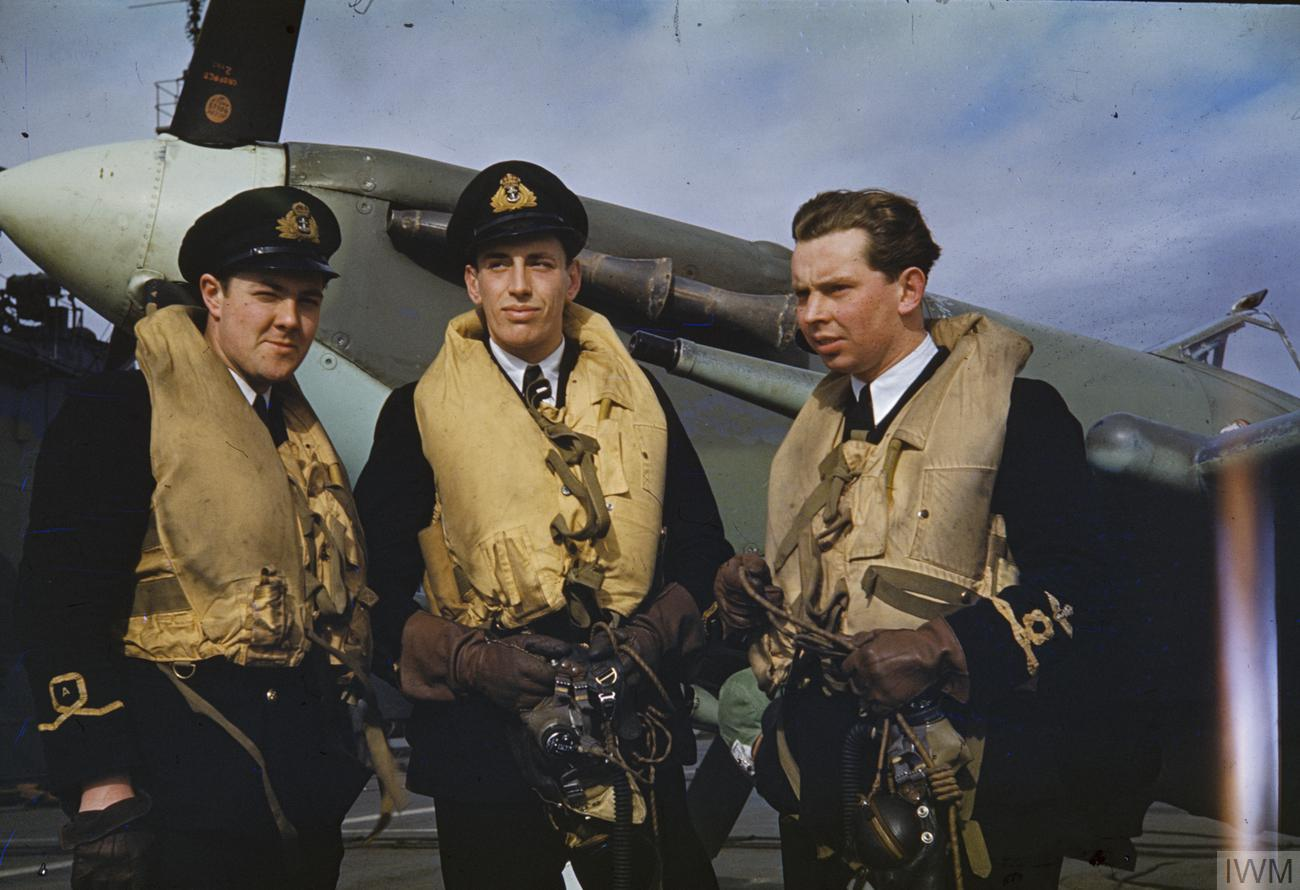
Three Fleet Air Arm pilots wearing "Mae West" life-jackets on board an aircraft carrier. A Supermarine Seafire can be seen in the background.

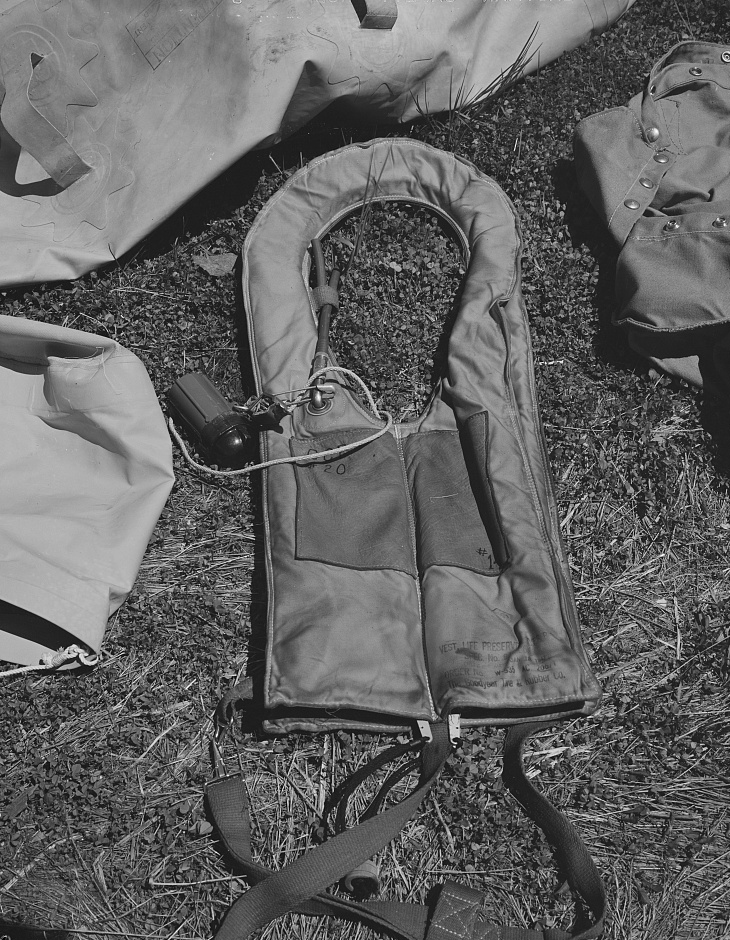
A "Mae West" life preserver

The Mae West was a common nickname for the first inflatable life preserver, which was invented in 1928 by Peter Markus (1885–1974) (US Patent 1694714), with his subsequent improvements in 1930 and 1931. The nickname originated because someone wearing the inflated life preserver often appeared to be as large-breasted as the actress Mae West. It was popular during the Second World War with U.S. Army Air Forces and Royal Air Force servicemen, who were issued inflatable Mae Wests as part of their flight gear. Air crew members whose lives were saved by use of the Mae West (and other personal flotation devices) were eligible for membership in the Goldfish Club.

British pilot Eric Brown noted in an interview that the Mae West device saved his life after he was forced into the ocean following the sinking of the aircraft carrier he was on, HMS Audacity, by a U-boat in WWII. Out of the twenty-four crew in his group in the water, the only two who survived were two pilots wearing Mae Wests, the rest were sailors wearing more basic flotation devices (inflatable rings) that kept them afloat, but did not keep their heads out of the water.

== Specifications ==
Devices designed and approved by authorities for use by civilians (recreational boaters, sailors, canoeists, kayakers) differ from those designed for use by passengers and crew of aircraft (helicopters, airplanes) and of commercial vessels (tugboats, passenger ferries, cargo ships). Devices used by government and military (e.g. water police, coast guard, navy, marines) generally have features not found on civilian or commercial models, for example compatibility with other items worn, like a survival vest, bulletproof vest/body armor, equipment harness, rappelling harness, or parachute harness, and the use of ballistic nylon cloth to protect pressurized CO_{2} canisters used for inflating the vest from injuring the wearer if struck by a round from a firearm. The ballistic cloth keeps the fragments from the canister from becoming shrapnel injurious to the user.

== Design and regulation ==
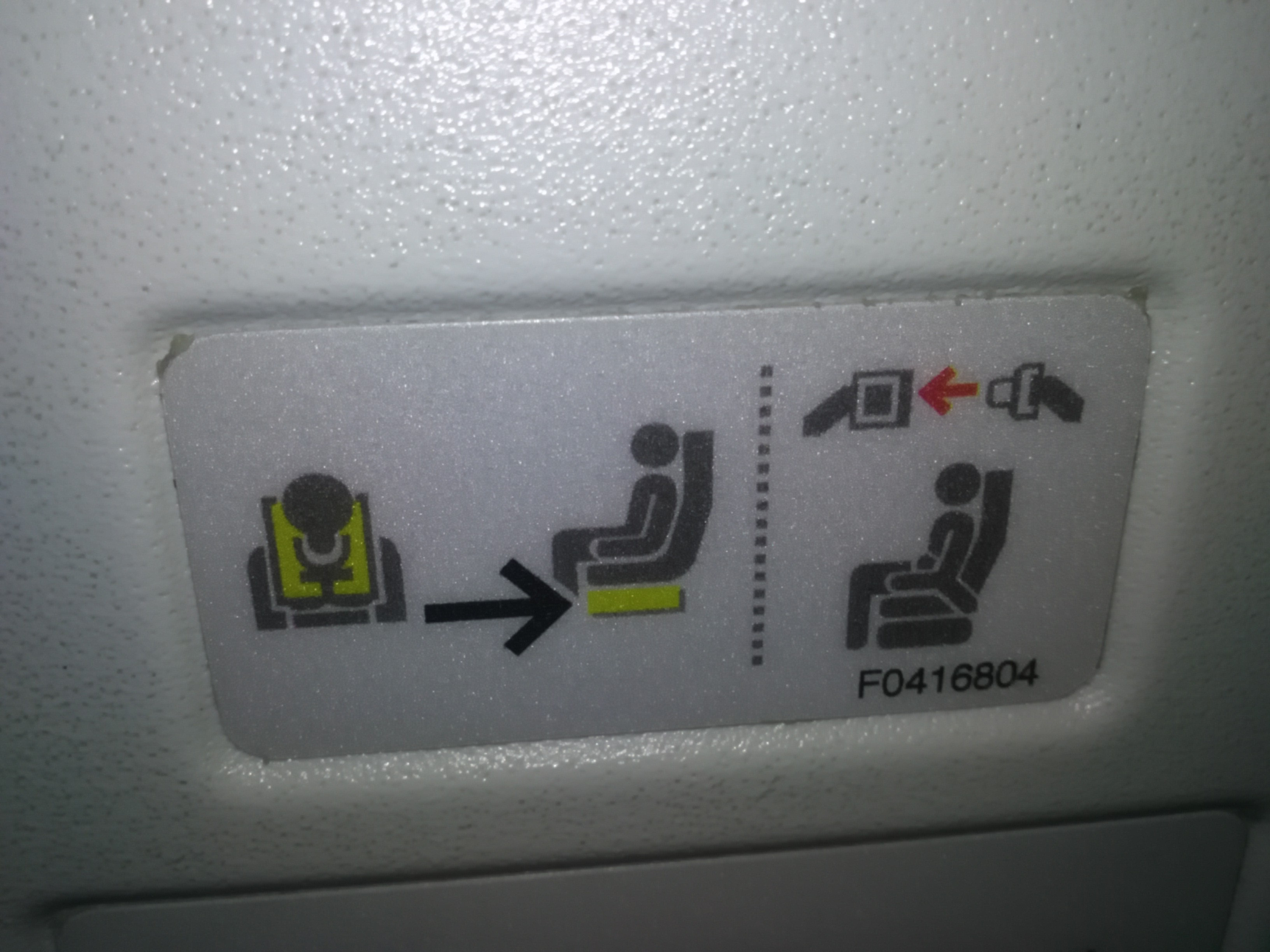
On many aircraft, life vests are stored underneath the seats, as indicated by this sign.

Life jackets or life vests are mandatory on airplanes flying over water bodies, in which case they consist of a pair of air cells (bladders) that can be inflated by triggering the release of carbon dioxide gas from a canister—one for each cell. Alternately, the cells can be inflated "orally", that is by blowing into a flexible tube with a one-way valve to seal the air in the cell. Life jackets must also be supplied on commercial seafaring vessels, be accessible to all crew and passengers, and be donned in an emergency.

Flotation devices are also found in near water-edges and at swimming pools. They may take the form of a simple vest, a jacket, a full-body suit (one piece coverall), or their variations suited for particular purposes. They are most commonly made of a tough synthetic fiber material encapsulating a source of buoyancy, such as foam or a chamber of air, and are often brightly colored yellow or orange to maximize visibility for rescuers. Some devices consist of a combination of both buoyancy foam and an air chamber. Retroreflective "SOLAS" tape is often sewn to the fabric used to construct life jackets and PFDs to facilitate a person being spotted in darkness when a search light is shone towards the wearer. In the US, federal regulations require all persons under the age of 13 to wear a life jacket (PFD) when in a watercraft under 39 feet (12 m) long. State regulations may raise or lower this number and must be followed when in that state's jurisdiction.

== Types ==
=== Buoyancy aid (foam core) ===
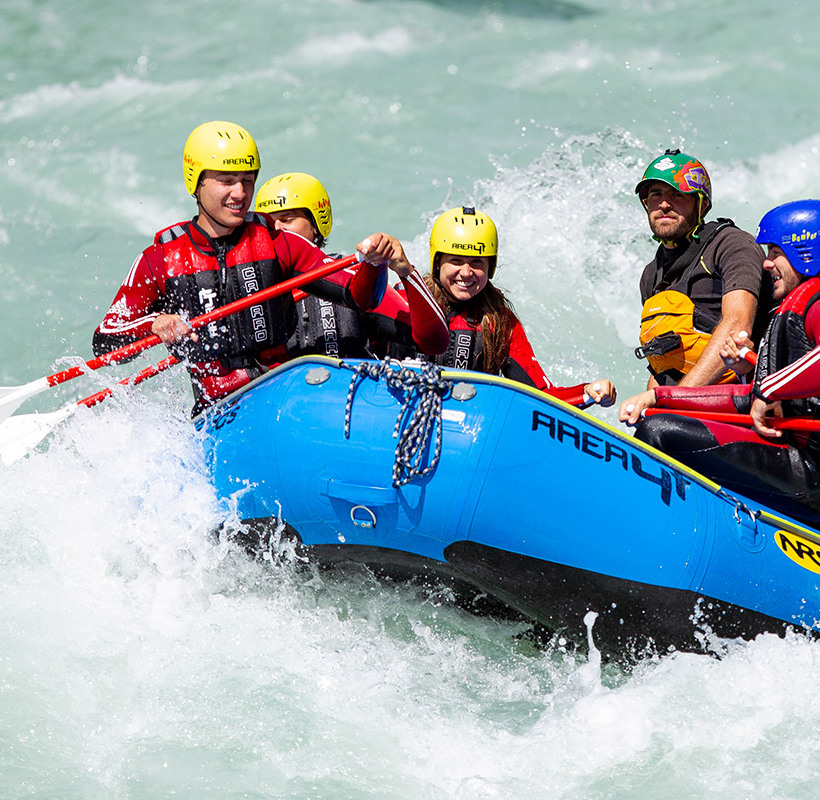
Rafting is a watersport where buoyancy aids are mandatory and often required by law, due to the constant risk of falling off the boat and into the wild water.

A buoyancy aid (with a foam core)

Buoyancy aids are designed to allow freedom of movement while providing a user with the necessary buoyancy. They are also designed for minimal maintenance and as they are only constructed from foam, they can be mass-produced inexpensively, making them one of the most common forms of PFDs.

Some buoyancy aids also come designed especially for children and youth. These vests may include one or two understraps to be worn between the legs of the wearer and also a headrest flap. The understraps are designed to keep the vest from riding up when worn in the water and restrict the wearer from slipping out of the life vest. These straps are adjustable and are included on many different life vests designed to be worn by everyone from infants to adults. The headrest flap is designed to help support the head and keep it out of the water. A grab handle is attached to the headrest to be used if needed to rescue or lift someone out of the water.

Buoyancy aids are rated by the amount of buoyancy they provide in pounds or Newtons - the minimum rating to be considered suitable as an adult life-jacket for offshore use is 34 pounds (150 N).

=== Life jacket ===
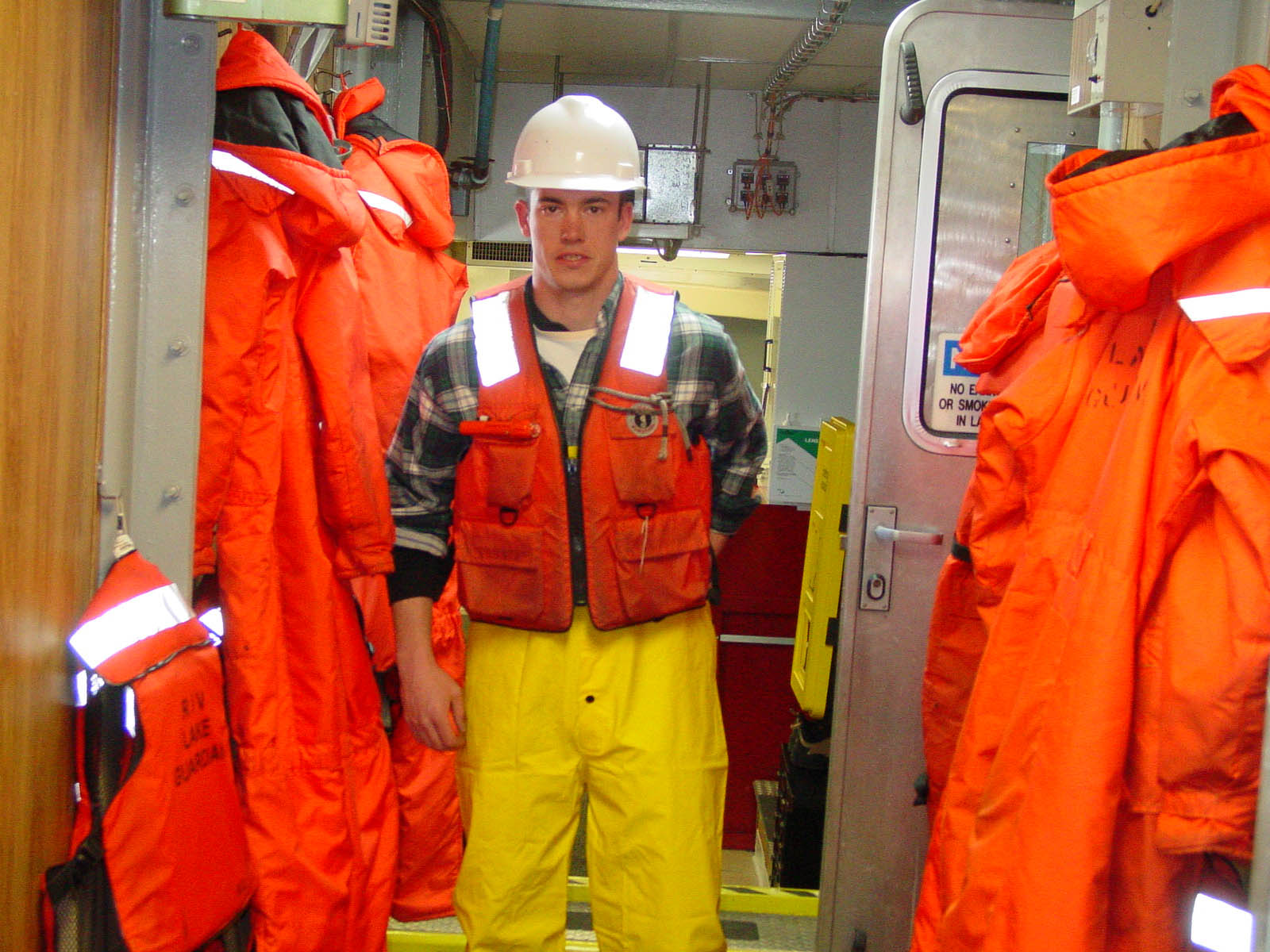
A man wearing a life vest, with another life vest hanging on a hook at lower left

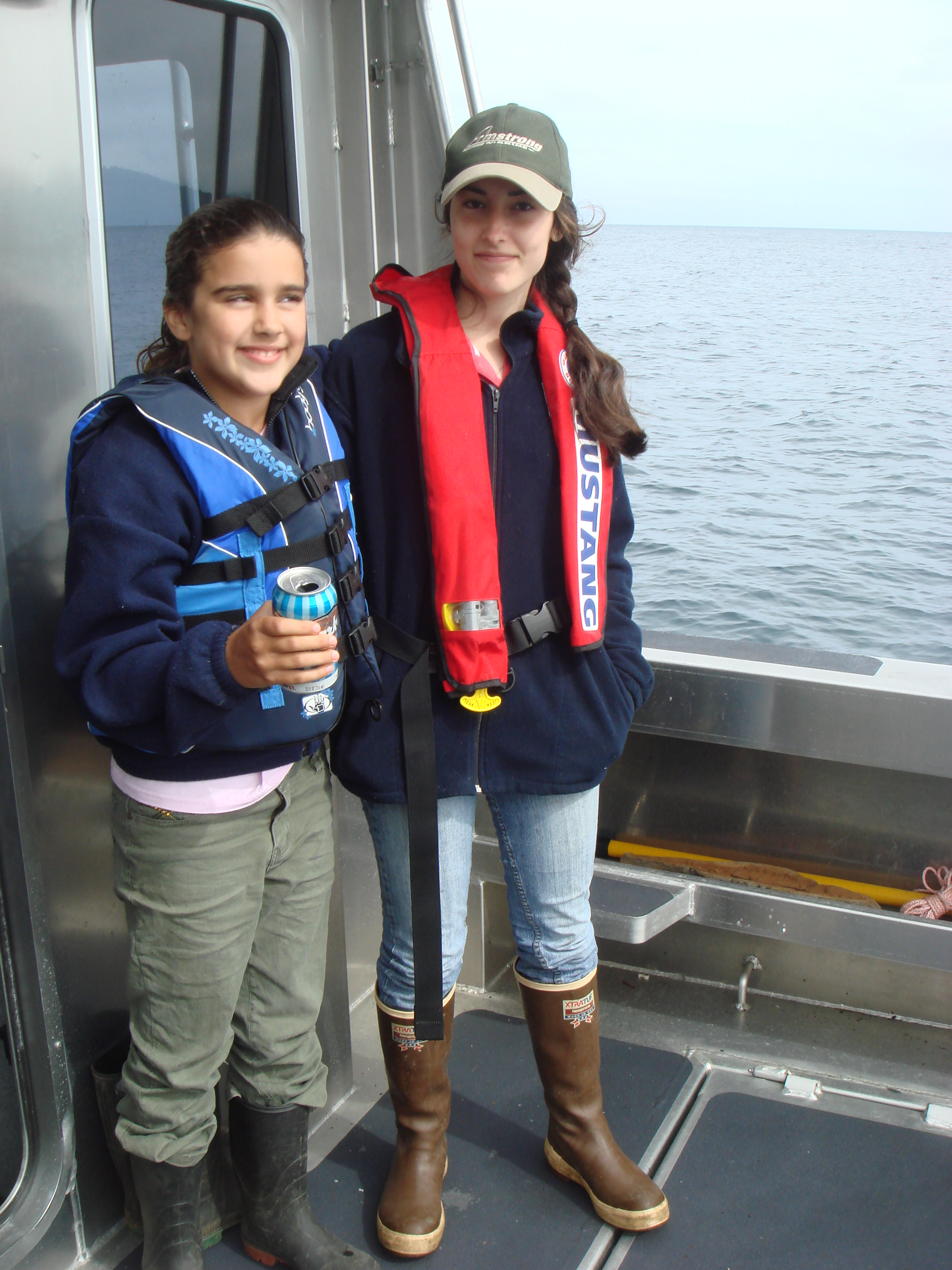
The person on the right is wearing an air chamber life jacket.

Life jackets for outfitting large commercial transport ventures in potentially dangerous waters, such as coastal cruises, offshore passages, and overwater air flights, consisting of either a single air chamber or a pair of (twin or double) sealed air chambers constructed of coated nylon (sometimes with a protective outer encasing of heavier, tougher material such as vinyl), joined, and buckled with a side release buckle. For use aboard ships they may be constructed of foam. Twin air chambers provide for redundancy in the event of one of the air chambers leaking or failing to "fire", for example if the thin air cell fabric is sliced open by sharp metal fragments during emergency evacuation and egress. Most life jackets for leisure use are of the single air chamber type.

Aircraft devices for crew and passengers are always inflatable since it may be necessary to swim down and away from a ditched or submerged aircraft and inflated or foam filled devices would significantly impede a person from swimming downward in order to escape a vehicle cabin. Upon surfacing, the person then inflates the device, orally or by triggering the gas canister release mechanism. Most commercial passenger life jackets are fitted with a plastic whistle for attracting attention. It has a light which is activated when in contact with water.

Quality life jackets always provide more buoyancy than offered by the buoyancy aids alone. The positioning of the buoyancy on the wearer's torso is such that a righting moment (rotational force) results that will eventually turn most persons who are floating face down in the water (for example, because they are unconscious) into a face up orientation with their bodies inclined backward, unlike more simply designed common foam buoyancy vests. A life jacket that is too loose may not provide sufficient buoyancy in case of an emergency.

Today these air chamber vests are commonly referred to as 'inflatable life jackets or vests' and are available not only for commercial applications but also for those engaged in recreational boating, fishing, sailing, kayaking and canoeing. They are available in a variety of styles and are generally more comfortable and less bulky than traditional foam vests. There are also life vests made especially for women.

The air chambers are always located over the breast, across the shoulders and encircle the back of the head. They may be inflated by either self-contained carbon dioxide cartridges activated by pulling a cord, or blow tubes with a one-way valve for inflation by exhalation. Some inflatable life jackets also react with salt or fresh water, which causes them to self-inflate. The latest generation of self-triggering inflation devices responds to water pressure when submerged and incorporates an actuator known as a 'hydrostatic release'. All automatic life-jackets can be fired manually if required. Regardless of whether manually or automatically triggered, a pin punctures the cartridge/canister and the CO_{2} gas escapes into the sealed air chamber.

However, there is a chance that these water pressure activated inflation devices do not inflate the life jacket if a person is wearing waterproof clothing and falls into the water face-down. In these cases the buoyancy of the clothing holds a person on the water surface, which prevents the hydrostatic release. As a result, a person can drown although wearing a fully functional life jacket. In addition there are some circumstances in which the use of self-triggering devices can result in the wearer becoming trapped underwater. For example, the coxswain of a bowloader rowing shell risks being unable to escape should the craft capsize.

To be on the safe side, a pill-activated inflation device is preferred. A small pill that dissolves on water contact is the safest option, as it also works in shallow waters where a hydrostatic activator fails. This type of jacket is called an 'automatic'. As it is more sensitive to the presence of water, early models could also be activated by very heavy rain or spray. For this reason, spare re-arming kits should be carried on board for each life jacket. However, with modern cup/bobbin mechanisms this problem rarely arises and mechanisms such as the Halkey Roberts Pro firing system have all but eliminated accidental firing.

Drifting in open seas and international waters, as encountered on long sea voyages and by military forces, requires prolonged survival in water. Suitable life jackets are often attached to a vest with pockets and attachment points for distress signaling and survival aids, for example, a handheld two-way radio (walkie-talkie), emergency beacon (406 MHz frequency), signal mirror, sea marker dye, smoke or light signal flares, strobe light, first-aid supplies, concentrated nutritional items, water purification supplies, shark repellent, knife, and pistol.

Accessories such as leg straps can be used to keep the inflated chambers in position for floating in a stable attitude, and splash or face shields constructed of clear see-through vinyl covers the head and face to prevent water from waves from inundating the face and entering the airway through the nose or mouth.

=== Immersion suit ===
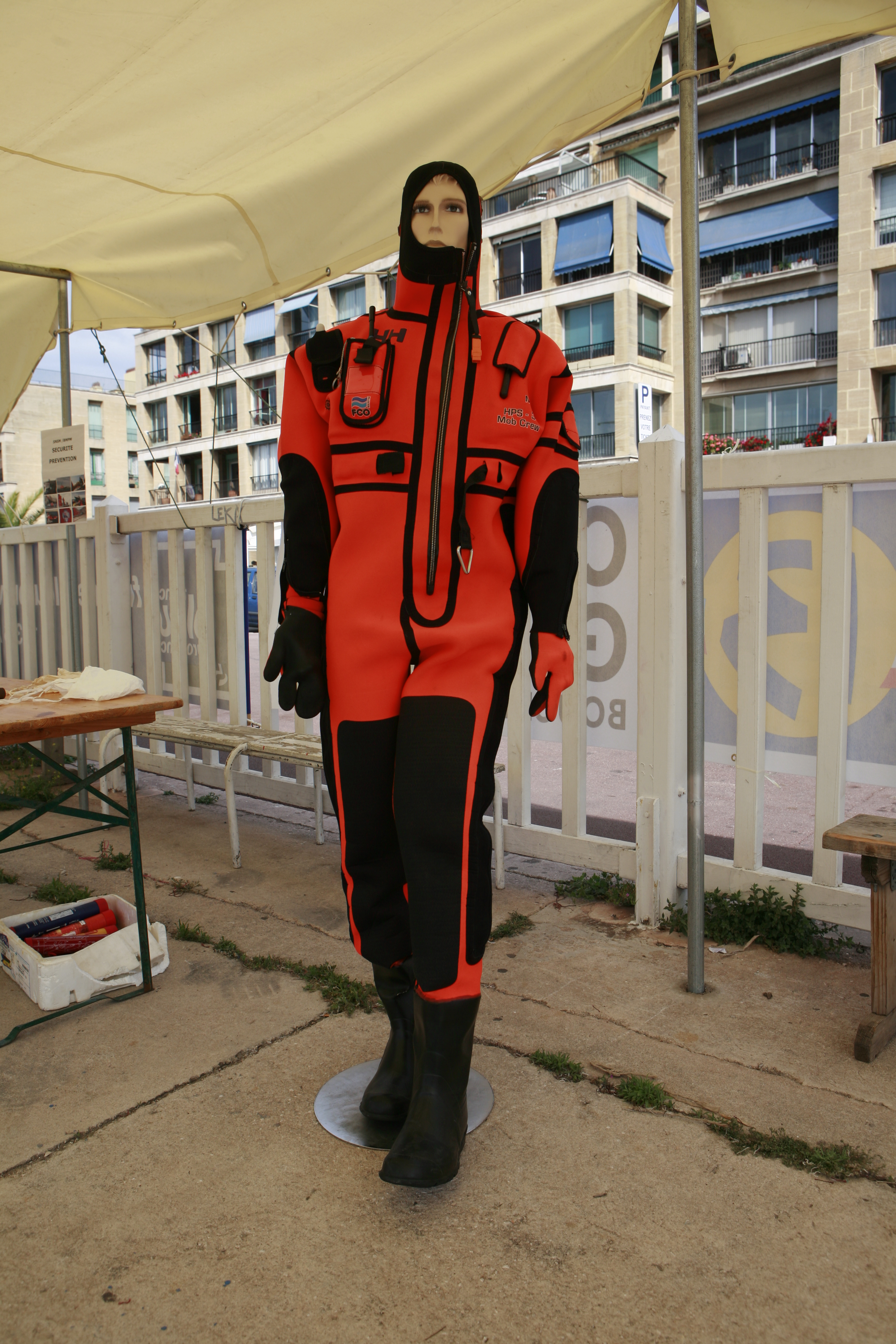
An example of an immersion suit on a mannequin

Some formats of PFDs are designed for long term immersion in cold water in that they provide insulation as well as buoyancy. While a wetsuit of neoprene rubber or a diver's drysuit provides a degree of flotation, in most maritime countries they are not formally considered by regulatory agencies as approved lifesaving devices or as PFDs.

It is possible for an incapacitated person in the water to float face-down while wearing only a wet suit or a dry suit since they are not designed to serve as lifesaving devices in the normal understanding of that term.

The Mark 10 Submarine Escape Immersion Equipment (SEIE) suit is intended to allow submariners to escape from much deeper depths than currently possible with the Steinke hood. Some United States Navy submarines already have the system, with an ambitious installation and training schedule in place for the remainder of the fleet.

Because it is a full-body suit, the Mark 10 provides thermal protection once the wearer reaches the surface, and the Royal Navy has successfully tested it at 600 feet (180 m) depths.

=== Buoyancy compensator ===
Scuba divers commonly wear a buoyancy compensator, which has an inflatable gas chamber. The amount of gas can be increased or decreased to enable the diver to ascend, descend or maintain neutral buoyancy at a given water depth and to provide positive buoyancy in an emergency to bring the diver to the surface or keep the diver at the surface.

=== Specialized ===
Specialized life jackets include shorter-profile vests commonly used for kayaking (especially playboating), and high-buoyant types for river outfitters and other whitewater professionals. PFDs which include harnesses for tethered rescue work ('live-bait rescue') and pockets or daisy-chains (a series of loops created by sewing flat nylon webbing at regular intervals for the attachment of rescue gear) are made for swiftwater rescue technicians.

=== PFDs for pets ===
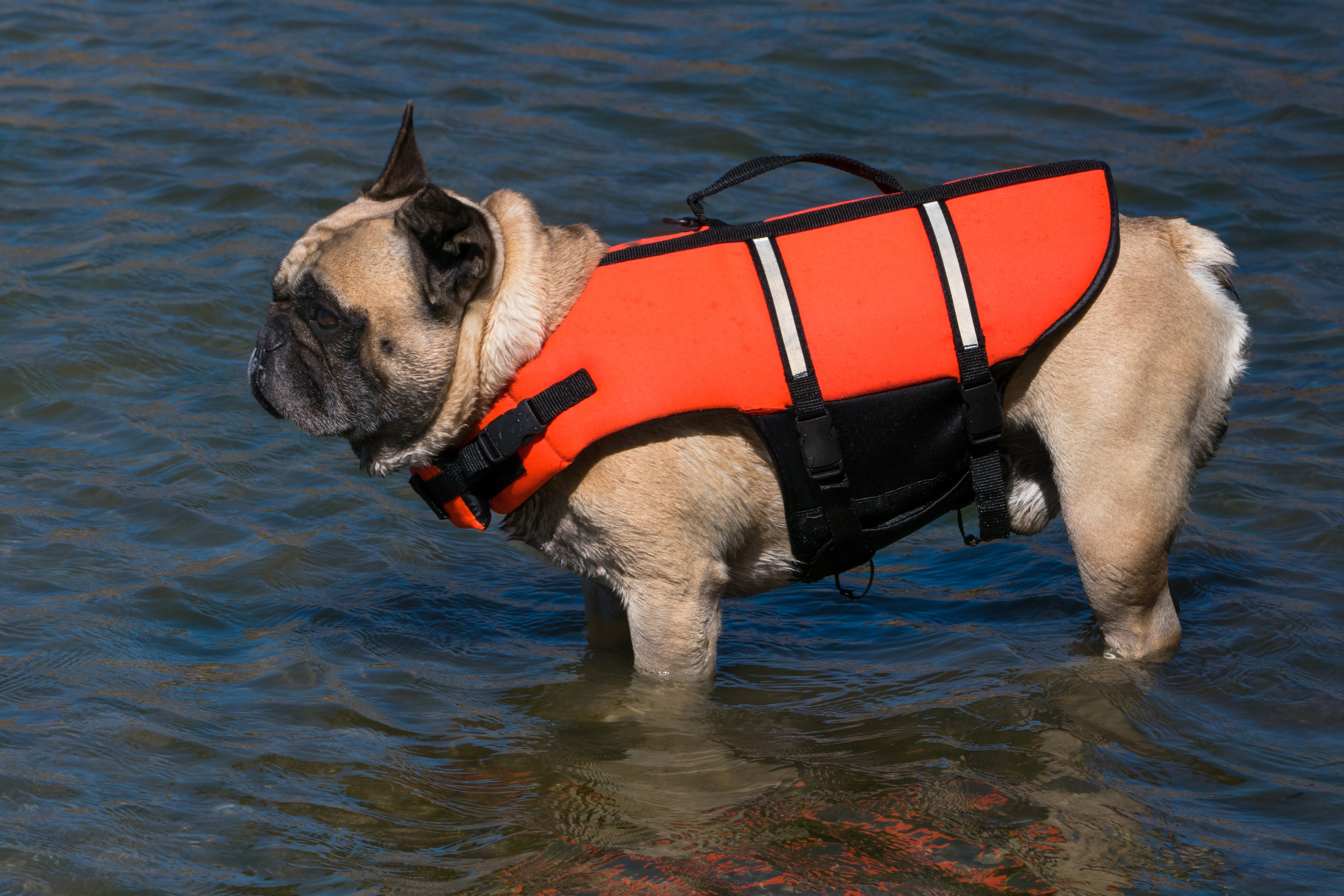
French bulldog wearing a life jacket

Personal flotation devices have been developed for dogs and other pets.

While the USCG does not certify personal flotation devices for animals, many manufacturers produce life jackets for dogs and cats. Dogs and cats have been known to die from drowning, either because they do not know how to swim, or because they tire out from overexposure or old age, or have a medical complication such as a seizure, or become unconscious.

Most life jackets on the market are designed with foam that wraps around the animal's torso and neck. They provide a basic amount of buoyancy for a dog, but may not provide enough support for the head. They are not ideal for use with heavy dogs. However, they often incorporate a grab handle, which may help to hoist the dog back into the boat.

Although most pet life jackets are passive devices, there is at least one automatically inflated life jacket available for pets (made by Critter's Inflatable, LLC). An automatic flotation device is generally more expensive than a foam life jacket, but, like automatic PFDs designed for humans, they are less bulky to wear when not inflated, and when inflated may provide more buoyancy than foam devices. Automatic pet flotation devices are popular in the bulldog community, and also for water therapy where extra support may be needed under the head.

== See also ==
- Napoleon Guerin
- Inflatable armbands
- Lifebuoy
- List of inflatable manufactured goods
- Muster drill
- Pool float
- Swim ring
