= Robert Guérin du Rocher =

French Jesuit

Blessed Robert Guérin du Rocher
- Born: 25 September 1736; Repas, France
- Died: 2 September 1792 (aged 55); Carmes Prison, Paris, France
- Venerated in: Catholic Church
- Beatified: 17 October 1926, Saint Peter's Basilica, Kingdom of Italy by Pope Pius XI
- Feast: September 2

Robert Guérin du Rocher was born in Repas in 1736. He was the younger brother of Petrus and like his brother became a Jesuit priest.

He did missionary work in the Middle east and eventually settled as a pastor in Salonika, before being expelled by the Ottomans. On returning to France he bacmae spiritual director for the Sisters of the Visitation in Paris.

On 2 September 1792 he was one of the priests, along with his older brother Petrus killed by a mob in the September Massacres. 134 years later he and his fellow Holy September Martyrs were beatified by Pope Pius XI in October 1926
