= Helene Guerin =

French opera composer

Mlle Helene Guerin (c. 1739 – fl. 1755) was a French composer. She composed an opera at age 16, titled Daphnis et Amalthée which was performed in Amiens in 1755. An anonymous writer reporting the event in the Mercure de France described her as coming from the "provinces" and having a good education.
