= Kouka =

Kouka may refer to:

- Kouka, Bam, Burkina Faso
- Kouka, Banwa, Burkina Faso
- Kouka, Cyprus
- Kouka, Togo
- The common name of Ahmed Hassan (footballer, born 1993)
