= Sainte-Honorine-la-Guillaume =

- Commune
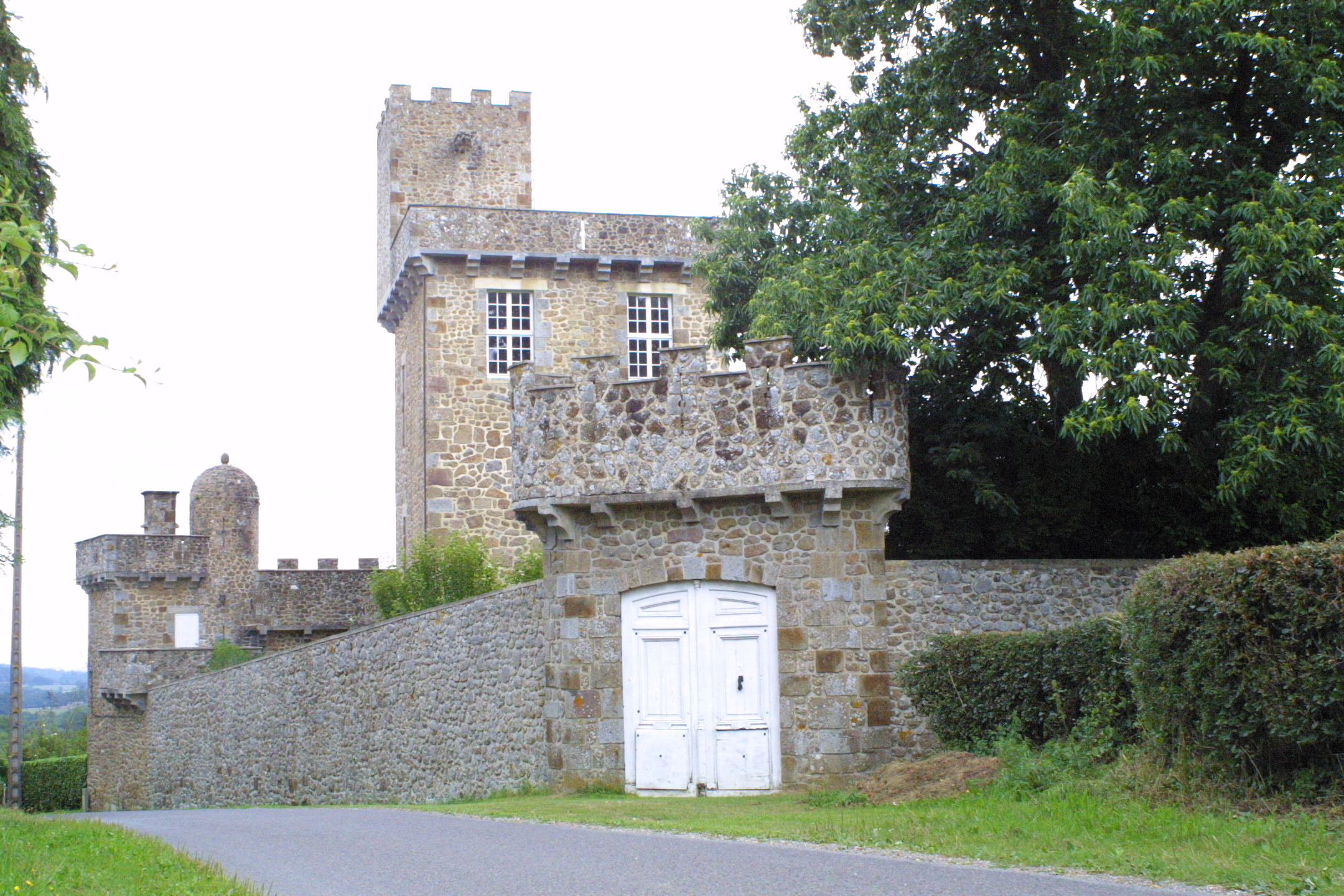
- The Joasière chateau in Sainte-Honorine-la-Guillaume
- Location of Sainte-Honorine-la-Guillaume
- Location within France Location within Normandy
- Coordinates: 48°46′54″N 0°22′41″W
- Country: France
- Region: Normandy
- Department: Orne
- Arrondissement: Argentan
- Canton: Athis-Val de Rouvre
- Intercommunality: Val d'Orne

Government
  - Mayor (2020–2026): Pierre Madeline
- Area^{1}: 14.87 km^{2} (5.74 sq mi)
- Elevation: 200 m (660 ft)
- Highest elevation: 276 m (906 ft)
- Lowest elevation: 124 m (407 ft)
- Population (2023): 349
  - Density: 23.5/km^{2} (60.8/sq mi)
- Time zone: UTC+01:00 (CET)
  - Summer (DST): UTC+02:00 (CEST)
- INSEE/Postal code: 61408 /61210
- ^{1} French Land Register data, which excludes lakes, ponds, glaciers > 1 km^{2} (0.386 sq mi or 247 acres) and river estuaries.

Sainte-Honorine-la-Guillaume is a commune in the Orne department in north-western France.

== Geography ==
The commune is made up of the following collection of villages and hamlets, La Fégrinière, Le Degré,La Thiboudière, La Guilminière, La Joasiére,La Dandière, La Héroudière, L'Être aux Roux,La Basserie, La Boscherie, La Briconnière,La Séramberie, L'Épierrière,L'Être Bisson and Sainte-Honorine-la-Guillaume.

The commune is part of the area known as Suisse Normande.

There are 4 watercourses that run through the commune, The river Rouvre plus three streams, Guesnerie, La Coulandre and the Vallees.

== History ==
- 1620: Georges Pierre is the vicar of this parish.
- 1622: Jean Le Corsonnois is curate and François Guérin "parish priest".
- 1622: "Mr Guillaume Lesage, squire, gentleman of la Bocherie and of the Rocher de Sainte-Honorine(la Guillaume)". His son is Jacques Lesage.

== Administration ==
Serge Clérembaux was mayor between 1971 and 2020. Pierre Madeline was elected mayor in 2020.

== Demography ==
Historical population
Year	Pop.	±% p.a.
1968	373	—
1975	322	−2.08%
1982	320	−0.09%
1990	327	+0.27%
1999	330	+0.10%
2007	364	+1.23%
2012	353	−0.61%
2017	334	−1.10%
2023	349	+0.73%
Source: INSEE

== Notable buildings and places ==
- Forest of Sainte-Honorine-La-Guillaume a public forest that is managed by National Forests Office of France.
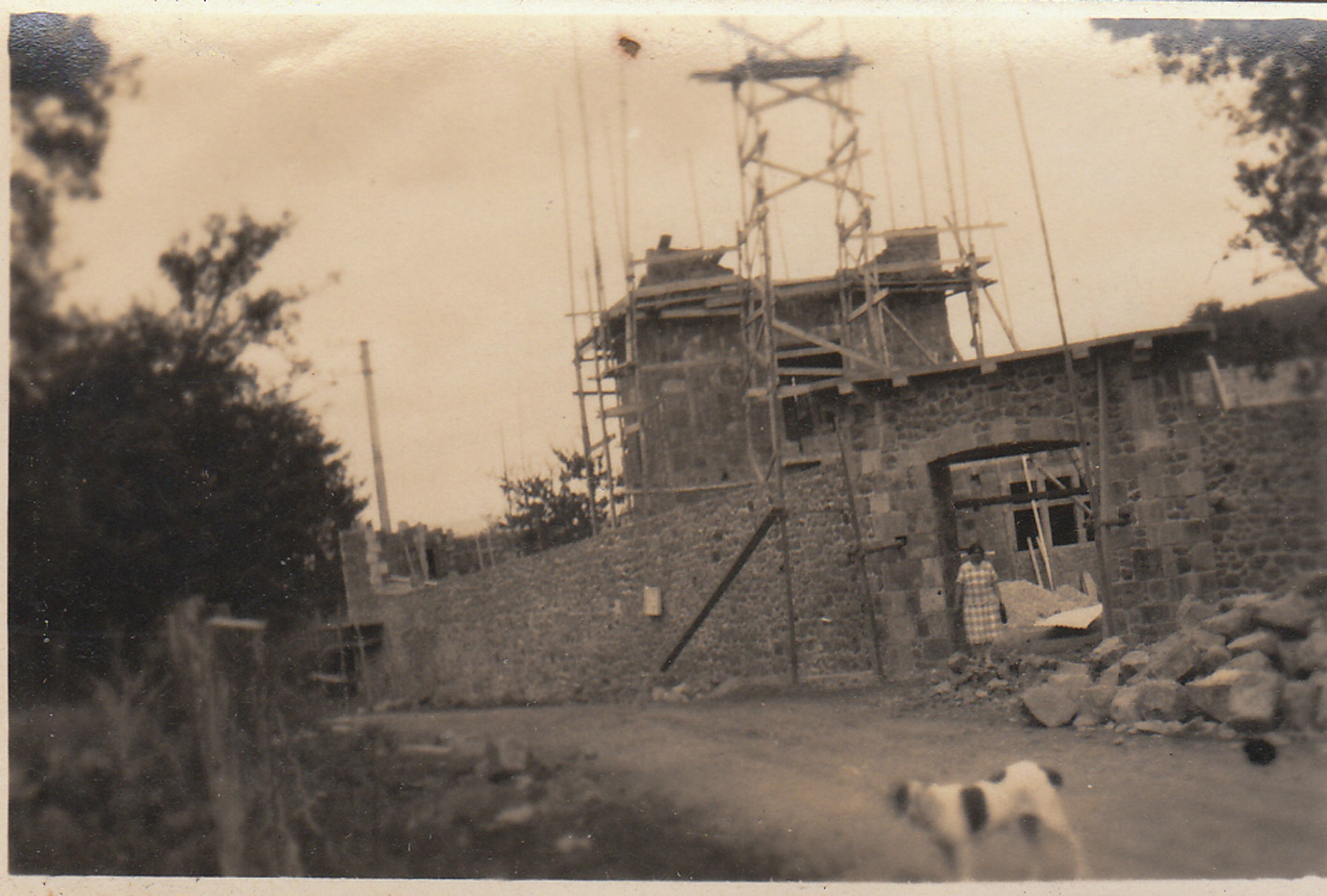
Sainte Honorine la Guillaume, La Joasière, 1930, Georges Baudy, restoration

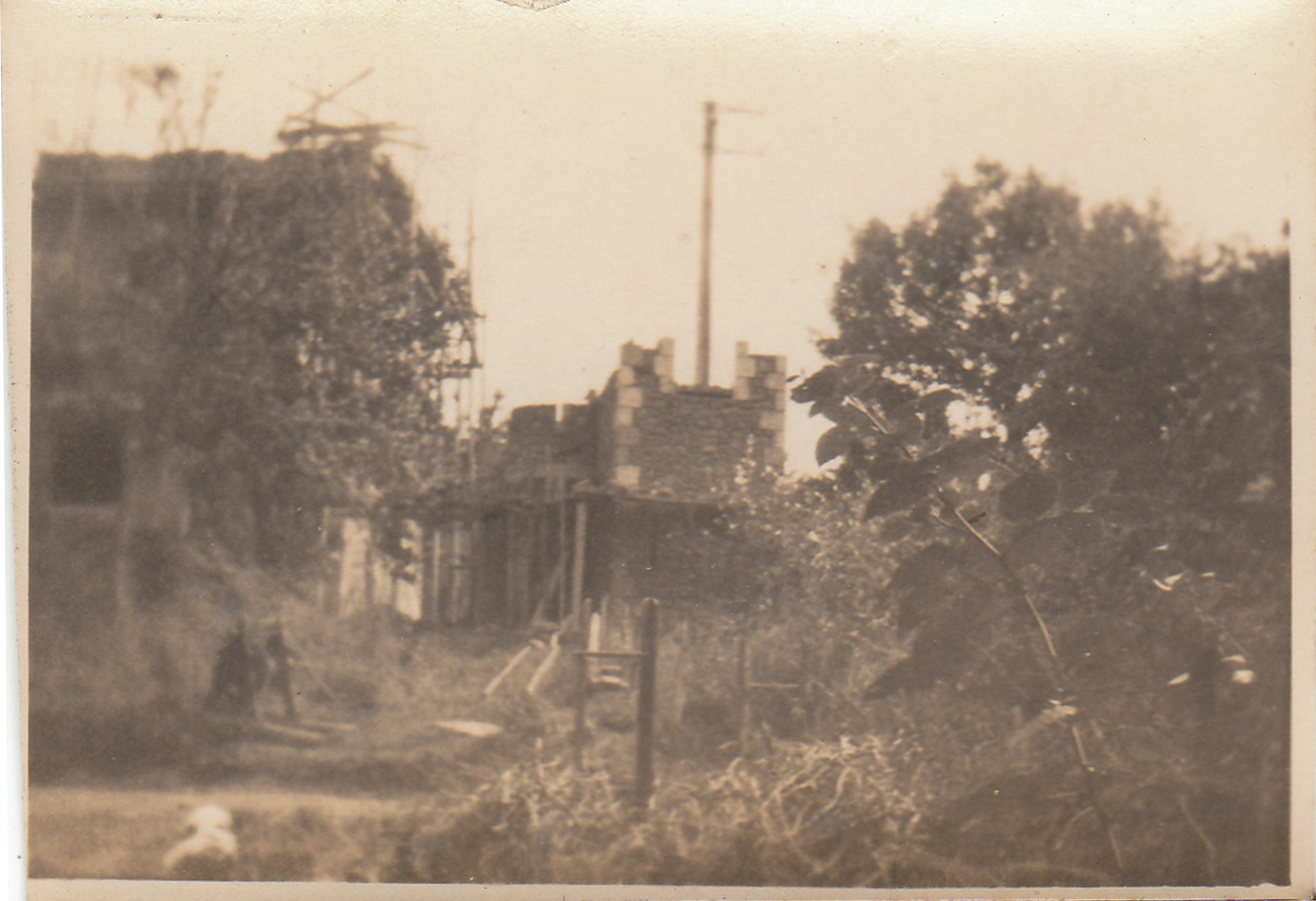
Sainte Honorine la Guillaume, La Joasière, 1930, Georges Baudy, restoration

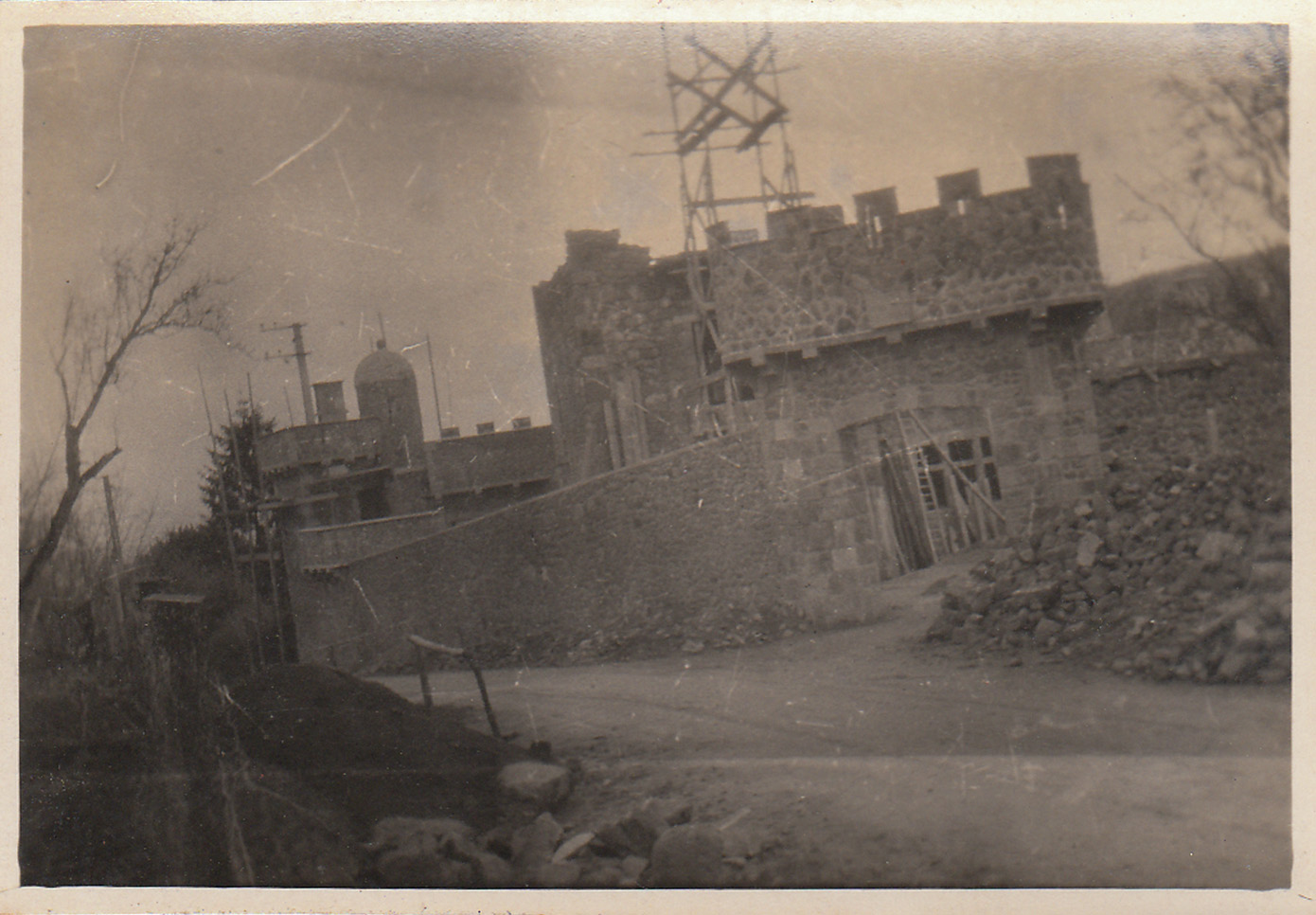
Sainte Honorine la Guillaume, La Joasière, 1930, Georges Baudy, restoration

== People linked with the commune ==
- Petrus Guérin du Rocher (1731–1792), a Jesuit priest, who was beatified by Pope Pius XI in October 1926.
- Hans-Joachim Klein, (1947 - 2022) a former German terrorist, who belonged to the Vienna commando in December 1975, was arrested at Sainte-Honorine in September 1998 where he had lived for several years. He was sentenced to nine years' imprisonment in Germany in January 2001 for the murder of an Iraqi security agent in 1975. He later benefitted from a pardon and returned to Sainte-Honorine-le-Guillaume. After his death he was buried here.

== See also ==
- Communes of the Orne department

== Bibliography ==
Jean-François Miniac (preface by Alain Lambert), Les Grandes Affaires criminelles de l'Orne, Éditions de Borée, coll. « Les Grandes Affaires criminelles », Paris, 2008, 336 p. (ISBN 978-2-84494-814-4)
