= Napoleon Guerin =

American inventor

Napoleon Guerin was an American inventor who obtained a U.S. patent for the first life preserver made of cork on November 16, 1841. It was constructed in jacket form, with two layers of material between which the cork could be inserted. Guerin suggested using between 18 and 20 quarts of rasped or grated cork, depending on the weight of the person, but he was not specific about the type of fabric to be used in the jacket, saying only that it could be "made of cotton or any other material."
