= Petrus Guérin du Rocher =

1700s contrarian Jesuit priest

Blessed Petrus Guérin du Rocher
- Born: 1 March 1731; Sainte-Honorine-la-Guillaume, France
- Died: 2 September 1792 (aged 61); Carmes Prison, Paris, France
- Venerated in: Catholic Church
- Beatified: 17 October 1926, Saint Peter's Basilica, Kingdom of Italy by Pope Pius XI
- Feast: September 2

Petrus Guérin du Rocher was born in Sainte-Honorine-la-Guillaume in 1731. He was a priest of the Jesuits. He taught philosophy at Bourges in 1762, before travelling around Italy, Germany and Poland, developing theories of biblical Exegesis, which contradicted the Encyclopédistes. His work saw him become director of a house of new converts in Paris and Queen Marie Antoinette chose him as her Confessor.

On the 2nd September 1792 he was one of the priests, along with his brother Robert Guérin du Rocher killed by a mob in the September Massacres. 134 years later, he and his fellow Holy September Martyrs were beatified by Pope Pius XI in October 1926
