= Polly Guerin =

American writer (died 2021)

Polly Guerin was an author, fashion historian and retired Fashion Institute of Technology adjunct professor.

Her 2013 book, The Cooper-Hewitt Dynasty of New York is an overview of Peter Cooper, his son-in-law, Abram S. Hewitt, and the latter's three daughters who were responsible for what is now the Cooper-Hewitt National Design Museum. In 2015, she published The General Society of Mechanics and Tradesmen of the City of New York: A History in honor of the more than two-hundred year history of the General Society of Mechanics and Tradesmen of the City of New York.
