= P. E. Guerin =

P.E. Guerin, Inc.
- Company type: Privately held company
- Founded: 1857; 168 years ago
- Founder: Pierre Emmanuel Guerin
- Headquarters: New York City, U.S.
- Key people: Andrew F. Ward (President); Martin Grubman (Vice President)
- Products: Bespoke hardware, furniture, lighting
- Owner: Ward family
- Website: peguerin.com

P.E. Guerin (/ɡəˈrɪn/; officially P.E. Guerin, Inc.) is the oldest decorative hardware firm in the United States and the only foundry based in New York City. Founded in 1857 by French-born immigrant Pierre Emmanuel Guerin (d. 1911), it has remained in its current location in the Greenwich Village since 1892. The company remains a family business in the fourth generation by Andrew F. Ward, the great-nephew of the founder.

== History ==
Pierre Emmanuel Guerin, originally from Brittany, France, immigrated to New York City in 1852 entering the country through Castle Garden in Lower Manhattan only aged 19. In 1857, he started Bertheley & Guerin which was the original predecessor of today's company as a general partnership specializing in metalworking.

In 1892, the company moved to its current location at 23–25 Jane Street, in the Greenwich Village of New York City. Its currently owned and managed by the fifth generation and remains a family business. P.E. Guerin is the only operating foundry in Manhattan.
