= 2016 meningitis outbreak in Ghana =

- Date: January 2016
- Deaths: 32
- Injuries: Reported cases: 153

Pneumococcal meningitis cases were recorded in Ghana in the last quarter of 2015 and an outbreak confirmed by the ministry of health was reported in January 2016. On January 26, 2016, it was reported that 153 people had become infected and 32 had died.
