= Jean Michel Prosper Guérin =

French painter

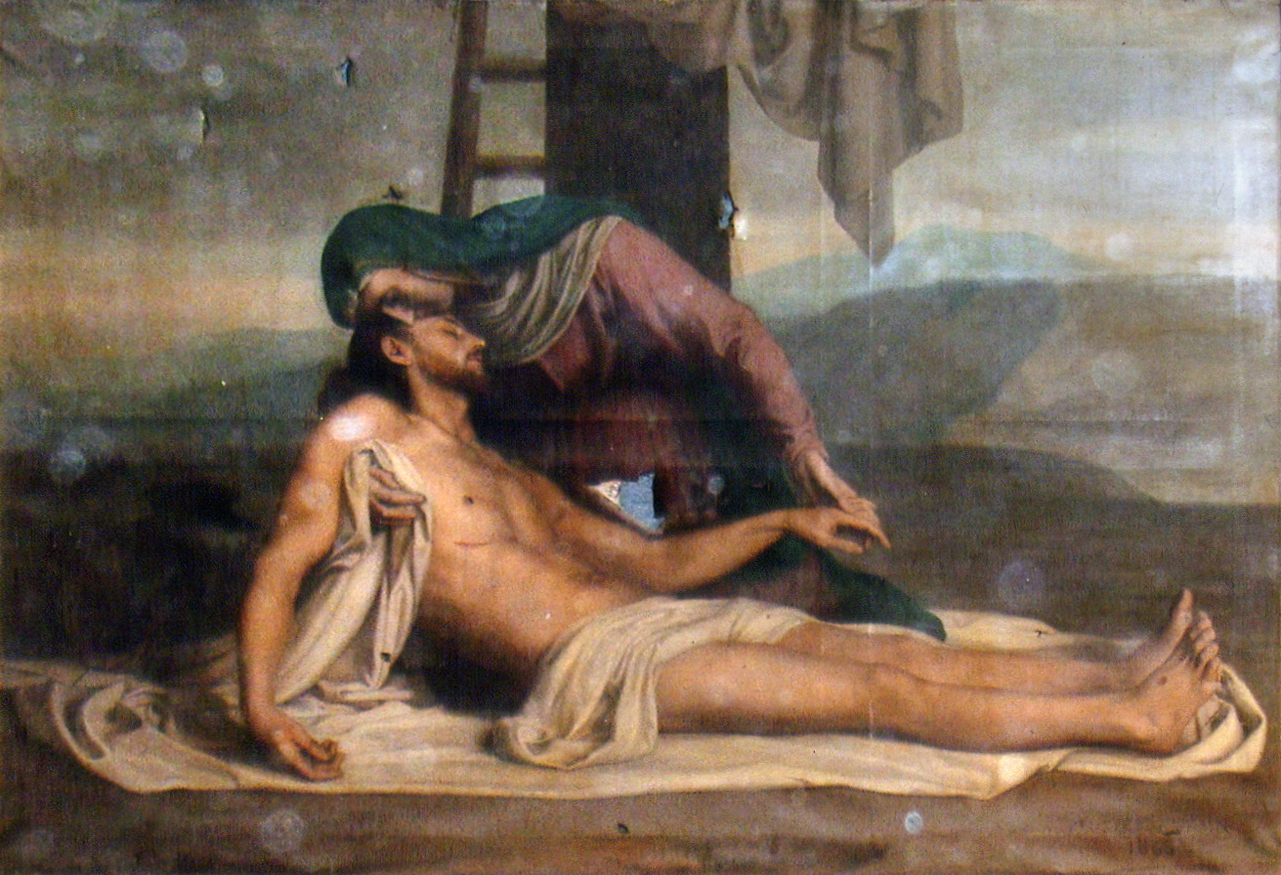

Jean Michel Prosper Guérin (1838 – 28 September 1917) was a 19th-century French painter. He studied in the Académie des Beaux-Arts where he was a pupil of painters like Flandrin. His son, Charles-François-Prosper Guérin (1875–1939) was also a painter.

== Works ==
These three pictures are property of French government:

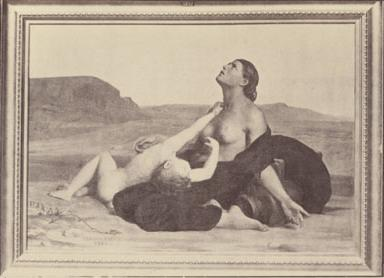
L'agar

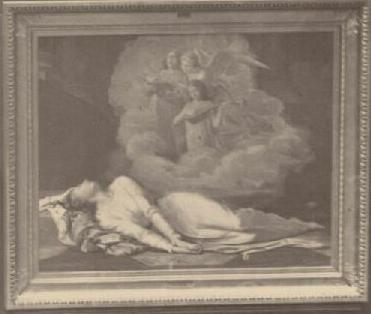
Sainte Cécile mourante entend un concert céleste

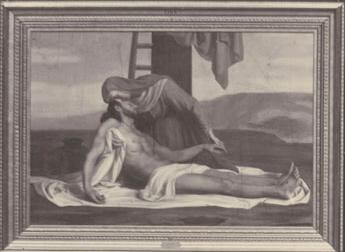
La Pietà
