= Guérin-Kouka, Dankpen =

- Location in Togo
- Coordinates: 9°41′N 0°36′E
- Country: Togo
- Region: Kara Region

Guérin-Kouka (or Kouka) is a city in Togo with 13,200 inhabitants (2004). It is the seat of Dankpen prefecture in Kara Region.
