= Rocher =

Rocher may refer to:

== Places ==
=== Canada ===
- Rocher Lake (Nipukatasi River), in the Broadback River watershed in Quebec
- Petit-Rocher, a village in Gloucester County, New Brunswick
- Rocher Percé, a natural arch near the village of Percé, Quebec

=== France ===
- Rocher, Ardèche, a commune in the department of the Ardèche
- Rochers de Naye, a summit of Alps
- Notre-Dame-du-Rocher, a commune in the department of Orne
- Saint-Antoine-du-Rocher, a commune in the department of Indre-et-Loire

=== Elsewhere ===
- Rocher de Monaco or Rock of Monaco, a monolith

== Other uses ==
- Allan Rocher (1936–2016), Australian politician
- Captain Rocher, a character in Dan Brown's book, Angels & Demons
- Ferrero Rocher, chocolate balls
- Guy Rocher (1924–2025), Canadian sociologist and academic
- Thierry Rocher (1959–2025), French playwright and actor
- Yves Rocher (1930–2009), French businessman and cosmetician
