= La Carneille =

Merged commune in Orne, France

- Part of Athis-Val-de-Rouvre
- Location of La Carneille
- Location within France Location within Normandy
- Coordinates: 48°46′43″N 0°26′41″W
- Country: France
- Region: Normandy
- Department: Orne
- Arrondissement: Argentan
- Canton: Athis-de-l'Orne
- Commune: Athis-Val-de-Rouvre
- Area^{1}: 15.91 km^{2} (6.14 sq mi)
- Elevation: 235 m (771 ft)
- Highest elevation: 262 m (860 ft)
- Lowest elevation: 135 m (443 ft)
- Population (2022): 565
  - Density: 35.5/km^{2} (92.0/sq mi)
- Time zone: UTC+01:00 (CET)
  - Summer (DST): UTC+02:00 (CEST)
- Postal code: 61100
- ^{1} French Land Register data, which excludes lakes, ponds, glaciers > 1 km^{2} (0.386 sq mi or 247 acres) and river estuaries.

La Carneille (French pronunciation: [la kaʁnɛj]) is a commune in the Orne department in north-western France. On 1 January 2016, it was merged into the new commune of Athis-Val-de-Rouvre.

The former commune is part of the area known as Suisse Normande.

== See also ==
- Communes of the Orne department
