= Antoine de Montchrestien =

French soldier, dramatist, adventurer and economist

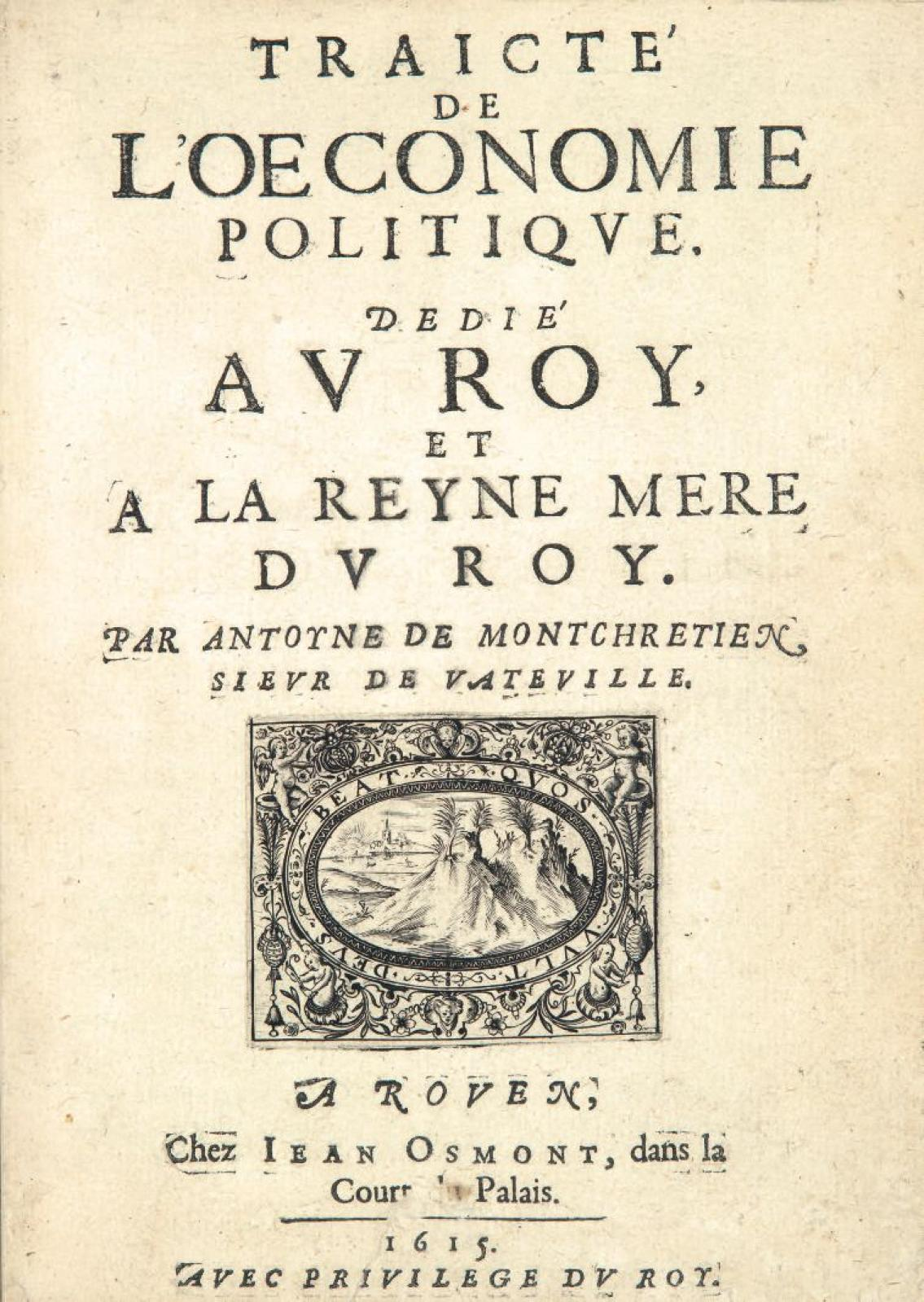
- Traicté de l'oeconomie politique (1615) written by Antoyne de Montchrétien
- Born: 1574; Falaise, France
- Died: October 1621 (aged 46–47); Les Tourailles, France
- Occupations: Soldier, dramatist, adventurer, economist

Antoine de Montchrestien (French: [ɑ̃twan də mɔ̃kʁetjɛ̃]; also Montchrétien; c. 1575 – 7 or 8 October 1621) was a French soldier, dramatist, adventurer and economist.

== Biography ==
Montchrestien was born in Falaise, Normandy. Son of an apothecary named Mauchrestien and orphan at a young age, Montchrestien came under the protection of François Thésart, baron de Tournebu and des Essarts, and became the valet of Thésart's children (allowing him to participate in their studies); he would later (1618) marry Thésart's daughter Suzanne. Later in his life he would also be favored by Henri II de Bourbon, prince de Condé.

Montchrestien initially sought a literary career (inspired by François de Malherbe): in 1595 he published his first tragedy, Sophonisbe or La Carthaginoise. In 1601, he published five more plays: the tragedies L'Ecossaise (on Mary Stuart), Les Lacènes, David ou l'Adultère, Aman, and the pastoral La Bergerie. In 1604, he added his tragedy Hector (which may not have been performed).

Montchrestien was involved in several duels (illegal in France from 1602 on); in 1603 he was left near dead; in 1604 or 1605 he killed his opponent and was forced to flee to England temporarily to avoid royal prosecution, but most likely through the influence of James I, to whom he dedicated his tragedy, L'Ecossaise, he was allowed to return to France, and he established himself at Auxonne-sur-Loire, where he set up a steel foundry.

In 1615 he published Traicté de l'économie politique, based chiefly on the works of Jean Bodin. In the history of economic thought, it is the first use of 'political economy' in the title of a book. It challenged Aristotle's position on the independence of politics from other social life, including economic activities. It also developed some major elements of subsequent Mercantilist thought, such as the value of productive labor use and wealth acquisition in promoting political stability. From around this time, Montchrestien was favored with several official positions (including governor of Châtillon-sur-Loire in 1617) which were financially advantageous, and he took the title "baron" and married.

In 1620 Montchrestien joined the rebellion of the Huguenots (there is no evidence that he shared the religious opinions of the party for which he fought; he had earlier belonged to the moderate party which had rallied round Henry IV) and was forced to fight against his former protector the prince de Condé. Unable to hold the city of Sancerre, Montchrestien returned to Normandy to attempt a raise troops, but on the night of October 7, 1621, he was discovered in an inn at Les Tourailles, near Falaise, and was killed. Tried posthumously, Montchrestien's body was put on the wheel and burned for lèse-majesté.

== Montchrestien's theater ==
Together with Robert Garnier and Alexandre Hardy, Montchrestien is one of the founders of 17th century French drama.

Montchrestien's tragedies are "regular"; they are in five acts, in verse and use a chorus; battles and shocking events occur off stage and are reported by messengers. His style shows an attention to detail (he reworked his verses extensively), and avoids both pedantry and convoluted syntax (unlike Alexandre Hardy). He was fond of laments, the use of stichomythia and gnomic or sententious lines (often indicated in his published plays by the use of marginal quotation marks).

Montchrestien's plays have been frequently criticized for being too close to Renaissance or Senecan tragedy in their lack of dramatic action and concentration on pathos and lament, and also for their dramatic inconsistencies. In L'Ecossaise, Elizabeth first pardons Mary, Queen of Scots, and no explanation is given of the change that leads to her execution. In Hector, the first two acts have Andromache, Priam and Hecuba trying to convince Hector to avoid fighting; act three has Hector rushing to the battle without a word to aid his faltering troops; act four has the residents of Troy believe that Hector has won the battle; the final act relates Hector's death and the play ends in lamentation.

Despite this lack of action, there is a great debate of ideas in this play (Is it better to seek glory or remain prudent? If prudence is mocked, does it affect one's reputation? Is one's duty to one's parents and king superior to one's duty to personal honor? Is virtue seen only through action?) that prefigures the dramatic debates and cult of heroism of Pierre Corneille (Horace, Le Cid) and Montchrestien's emotional women (touched by dreams and bad omens) also mirror Corneille's tragic female characters.

Montchrétien's Aman has been compared to Jean Racine's Esther, though Haman's hatred for Mordecai is expressed with more vigour than in Racine's play.

Montchrétien was a poet, economist, iron-master and soldier, as literature was not yet a profession.

== Works ==
- Montchrestien, Antoine de, 1615. Traicté de l'oeconomie politique. F. Billacois, ed., 1999, critical-edition preview.
