= Athis-Val de Rouvre =

- Commune
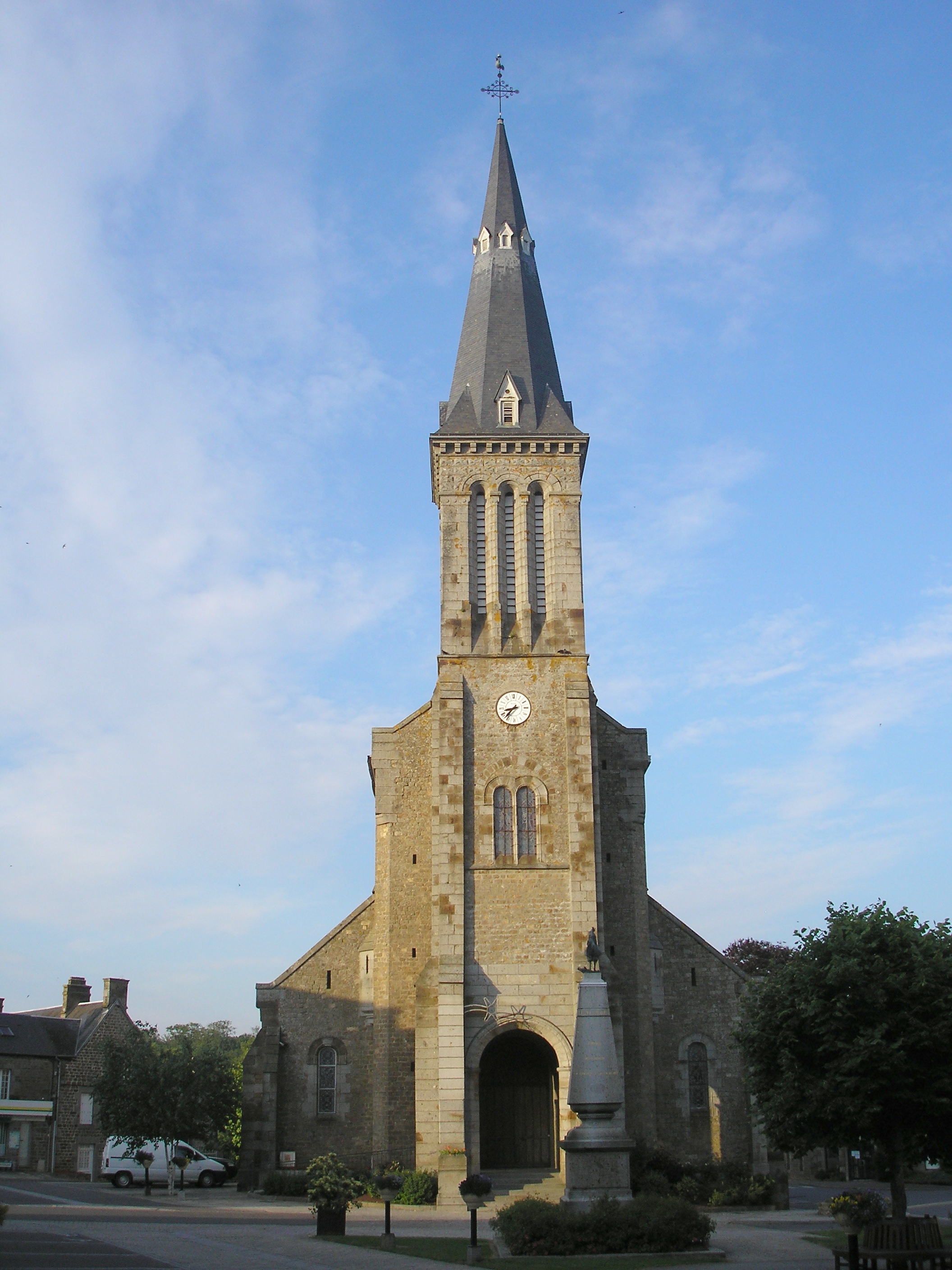
- The church in Athis-Val-de-Rouvre
- Location of Athis-Val de Rouvre
- Location within France Location within Normandy
- Coordinates: 48°48′40″N 0°29′56″W
- Country: France
- Region: Normandy
- Department: Orne
- Arrondissement: Argentan
- Canton: Athis-Val de Rouvre
- Intercommunality: CA Flers Agglo

Government
  - Mayor (2020–2026): Alain Lange
- Area^{1}: 76.97 km^{2} (29.72 sq mi)
- Population (2023): 4,201
  - Density: 54.58/km^{2} (141.4/sq mi)
- Time zone: UTC+01:00 (CET)
  - Summer (DST): UTC+02:00 (CEST)
- INSEE/Postal code: 61007 /61430, 61100
- ^{1} French Land Register data, which excludes lakes, ponds, glaciers > 1 km^{2} (0.386 sq mi or 247 acres) and river estuaries.

Athis-Val de Rouvre (French pronunciation: [atis val də ʁuvʁ]) is a commune in the department of Orne, northwestern France, the municipality was established on 1 January 2016 by merger of the former communes of Athis-de-l'Orne (the seat), Bréel, La Carneille, Notre-Dame-du-Rocher, Ronfeugerai, Ségrie-Fontaine, Taillebois and Les Tourailles.

== Geography ==
The commune is part of the area known as Suisse Normande.

The commune is made up of the following collection of villages and hamlets: Le Rocher Nantreuil, La Tarillée, La Motte, Ronfeugerai, La Fosse, La Mancelière, L'Être Hardy, La Pigeonnière, La Carneille, Taillebois, Le Hamel, Les Onfrairies, Les Tourailles, Notre-Dame-du-Rocher, Ségrie-Fontaine, Oëtre, Le Douit de Bréel, Bréel, Le Val Fermé and Athis.

The Commune with another 20 communes shares part of a 2,115 hectare, Natura 2000 conservation area, called the Vallée de l'Orne et ses affluents.

The commune has four rivers running through it, La Vere, the Gine, Le Lembron and the Rouvre. In addition there are eight streams running through the commune, Aubusson, La Coulandre, Meheudin, Ferronniere, Fontaine, Le Lembronnet, La Courteille and Onfrairies.

=== Climate ===
Athis-Val de Rouvre benefits from an oceanic climate with mild winters and temperate summers.

Climate data for Athis-Val de Rouvre (1991–2012 normals, extremes 1968–2012)
Month	Jan	Feb	Mar	Apr	May	Jun	Jul	Aug	Sep	Oct	Nov	Dec	Year
Record high °C (°F)	15.0 (59.0)	20.0 (68.0)	24.0 (75.2)	27.9 (82.2)	31.1 (88.0)	35.4 (95.7)	36.0 (96.8)	39.2 (102.6)	33.5 (92.3)	29.5 (85.1)	19.7 (67.5)	15.6 (60.1)	39.2 (102.6)
Mean daily maximum °C (°F)	7.3 (45.1)	8.6 (47.5)	11.9 (53.4)	14.7 (58.5)	18.4 (65.1)	21.4 (70.5)	23.4 (74.1)	23.7 (74.7)	20.3 (68.5)	15.7 (60.3)	11.0 (51.8)	7.5 (45.5)	15.3 (59.5)
Daily mean °C (°F)	4.3 (39.7)	4.9 (40.8)	7.2 (45.0)	9.3 (48.7)	12.8 (55.0)	15.6 (60.1)	17.4 (63.3)	17.6 (63.7)	14.6 (58.3)	11.3 (52.3)	7.4 (45.3)	4.4 (39.9)	10.6 (51.1)
Mean daily minimum °C (°F)	1.3 (34.3)	1.1 (34.0)	2.6 (36.7)	3.9 (39.0)	7.2 (45.0)	9.8 (49.6)	11.5 (52.7)	11.5 (52.7)	8.9 (48.0)	7.0 (44.6)	3.9 (39.0)	1.4 (34.5)	5.8 (42.4)
Record low °C (°F)	−22.6 (−8.7)	−15.0 (5.0)	−12.0 (10.4)	−6.0 (21.2)	−4.7 (23.5)	0.2 (32.4)	2.5 (36.5)	1.6 (34.9)	−1.5 (29.3)	−6.8 (19.8)	−9.3 (15.3)	−12.5 (9.5)	−22.6 (−8.7)
Average precipitation mm (inches)	98.9 (3.89)	75.4 (2.97)	65.1 (2.56)	65.4 (2.57)	73.1 (2.88)	61.2 (2.41)	60.6 (2.39)	69.1 (2.72)	69.0 (2.72)	96.5 (3.80)	97.5 (3.84)	112.9 (4.44)	944.7 (37.19)
Average precipitation days (≥ 1.0 mm)	14.3	12.6	11.7	11.3	10.4	8.6	8.8	9.5	9.9	13.5	14.7	15.4	140.9
Source: Meteociel

== Population ==
Population data refer to the area corresponding with the commune as of January 2025.

Historical population
Year	Pop.	±% p.a.
1968	3,739	—
1975	3,885	+0.55%
1982	4,194	+1.10%
1990	4,175	−0.06%
1999	4,066	−0.29%
2007	4,298	+0.70%
2012	4,319	+0.10%
2017	4,256	−0.29%
2023	4,201	−0.22%
Source: INSEE

== Notable buildings and places ==
Jardin Intérieur à Ciel Ouvert is a contemporary garden that was made open to the public in 2011, featuring over 1,200 species of plants. It was classified as a Jardins remarquables by the Ministry of Culture and the Comité des Parcs et Jardins de France in 2019.

=== National heritage sites ===
The Commune has 6 buildings and areas listed as a Monument historique.

- Martinique cotton spinning factory a nineteenth century spinning factory, based in Athis-de-l'Orne that is still being used today .
- Croix de pierre a sixteenth century cross in La Carneille.
- Church of Saint-Vigor a nineteenth century church in Athis-de-l'Orne, designed by architect Ruprich-Robert and the walls were decorated by artist Louis Chifflet.
- Church of Saint-Pierre and Saint-Paul a modern church in Bréel that contains a chapel from the end of the 15th century, intended for the burial of the Corday family.
- Hamel Saint-Etienne Lodge a 15th-century lodge in La Carneille.
- Logis dit la Cour a 15th-century Manor house in Taillebois.
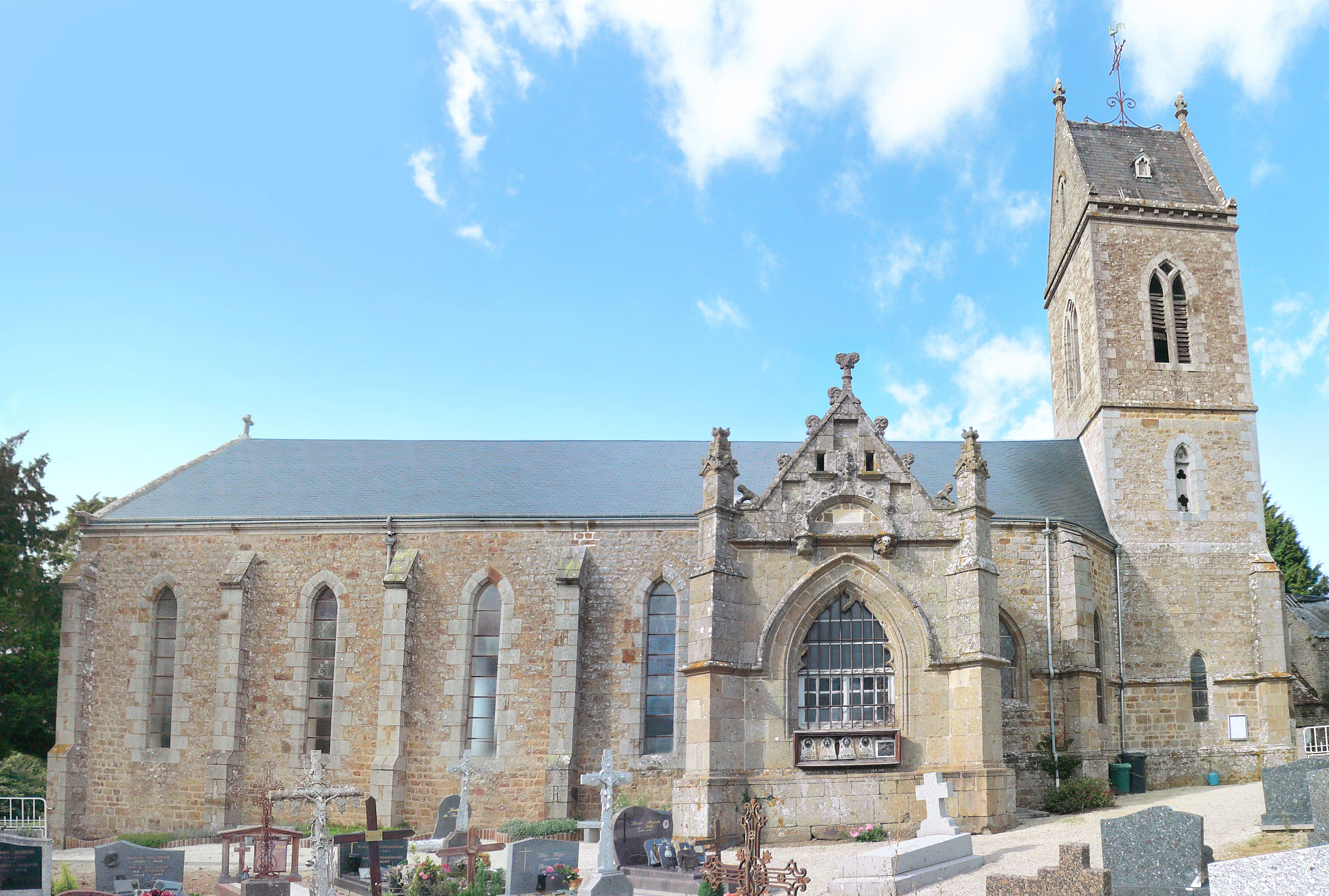
Church of SaintPierre-et-SaintPaul in Breel-by Rundvald

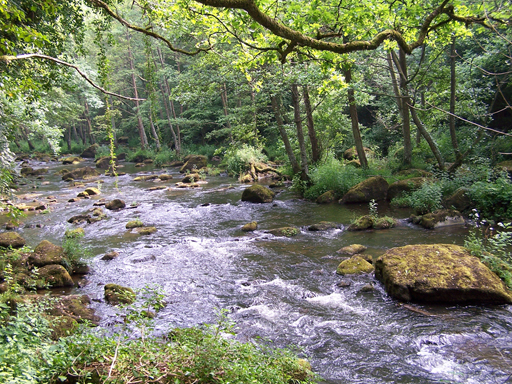
Gorges of la Rouvre

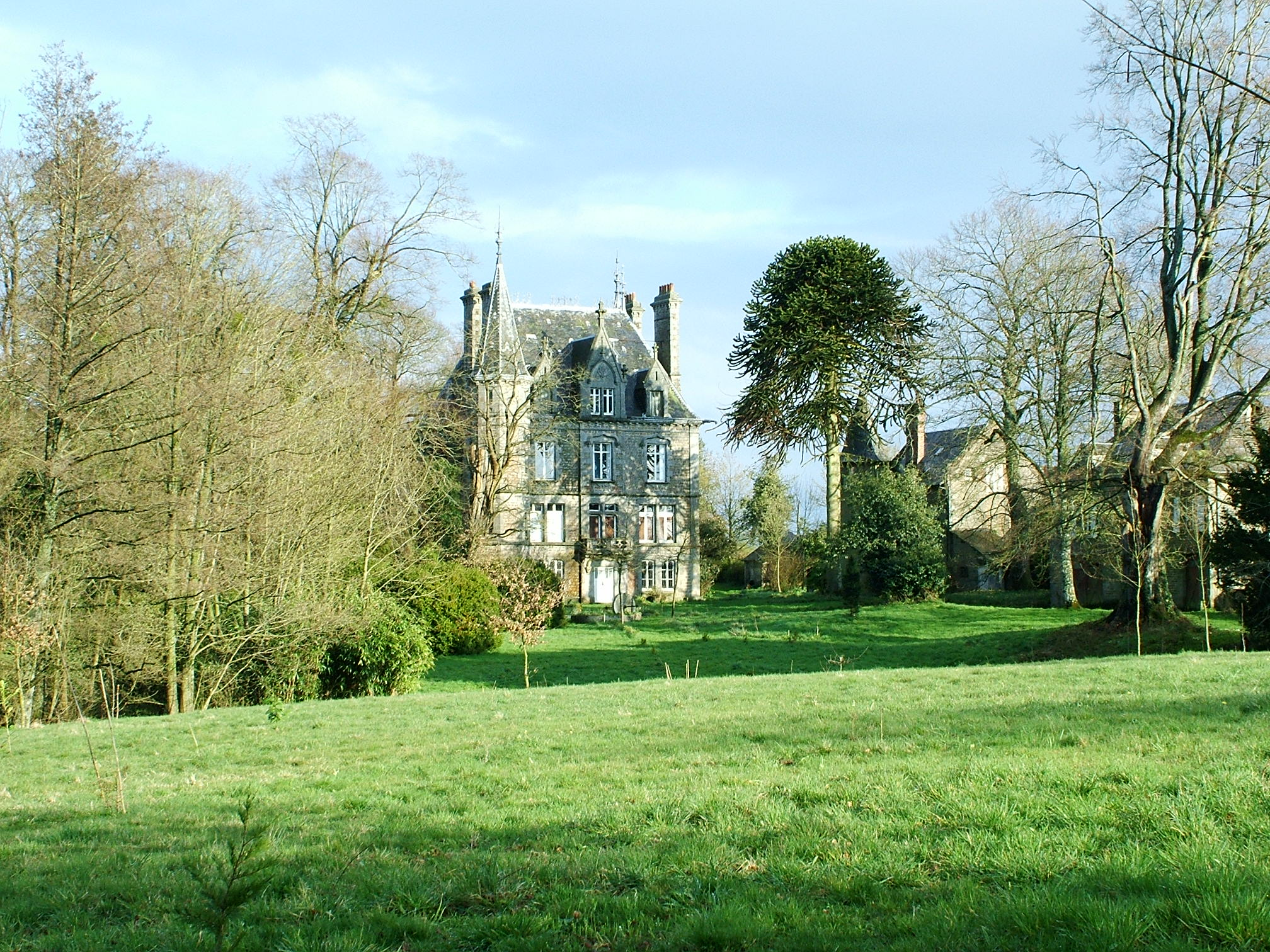
Château des Hayes

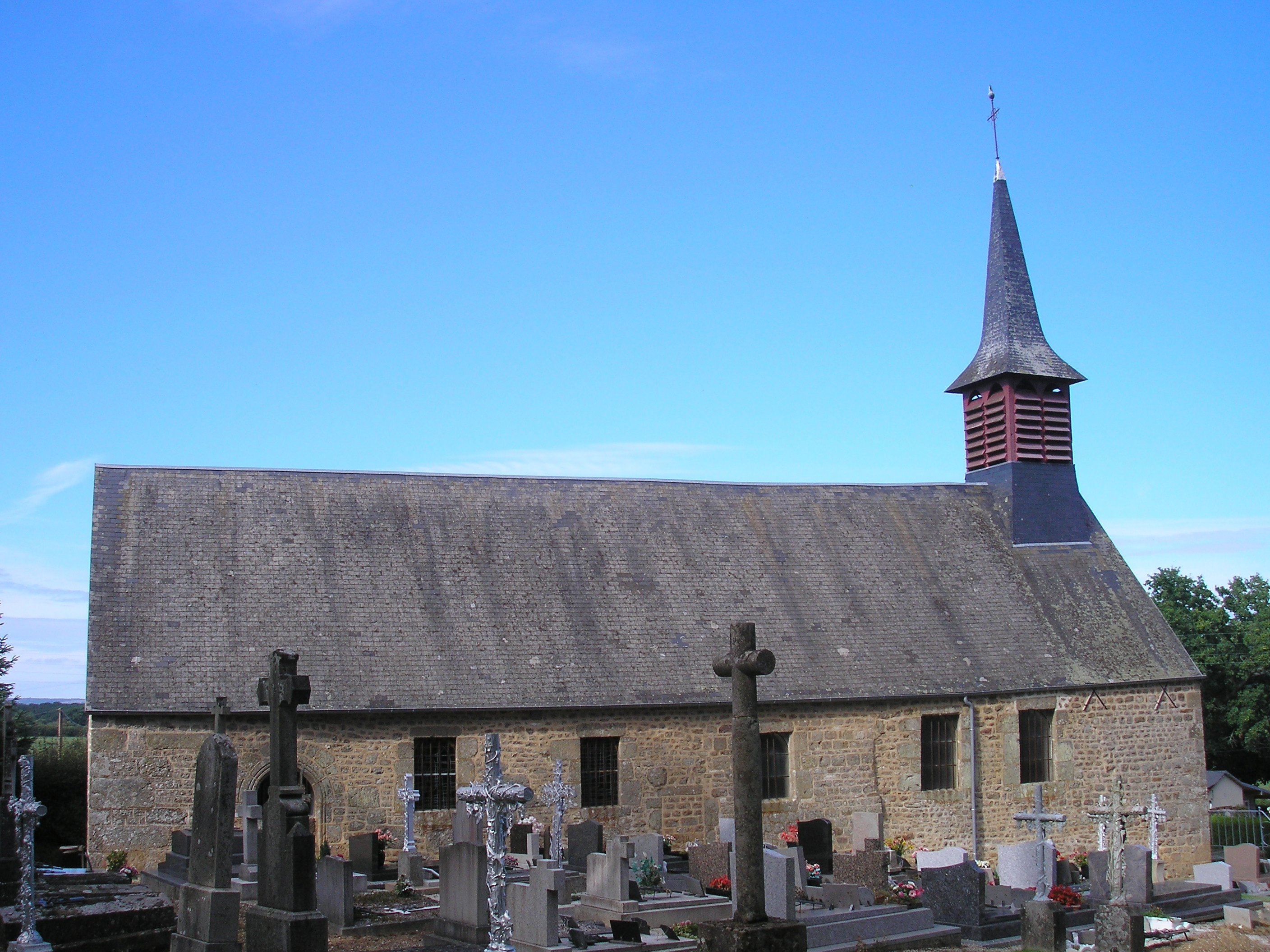
Notre Dame Du Rocher

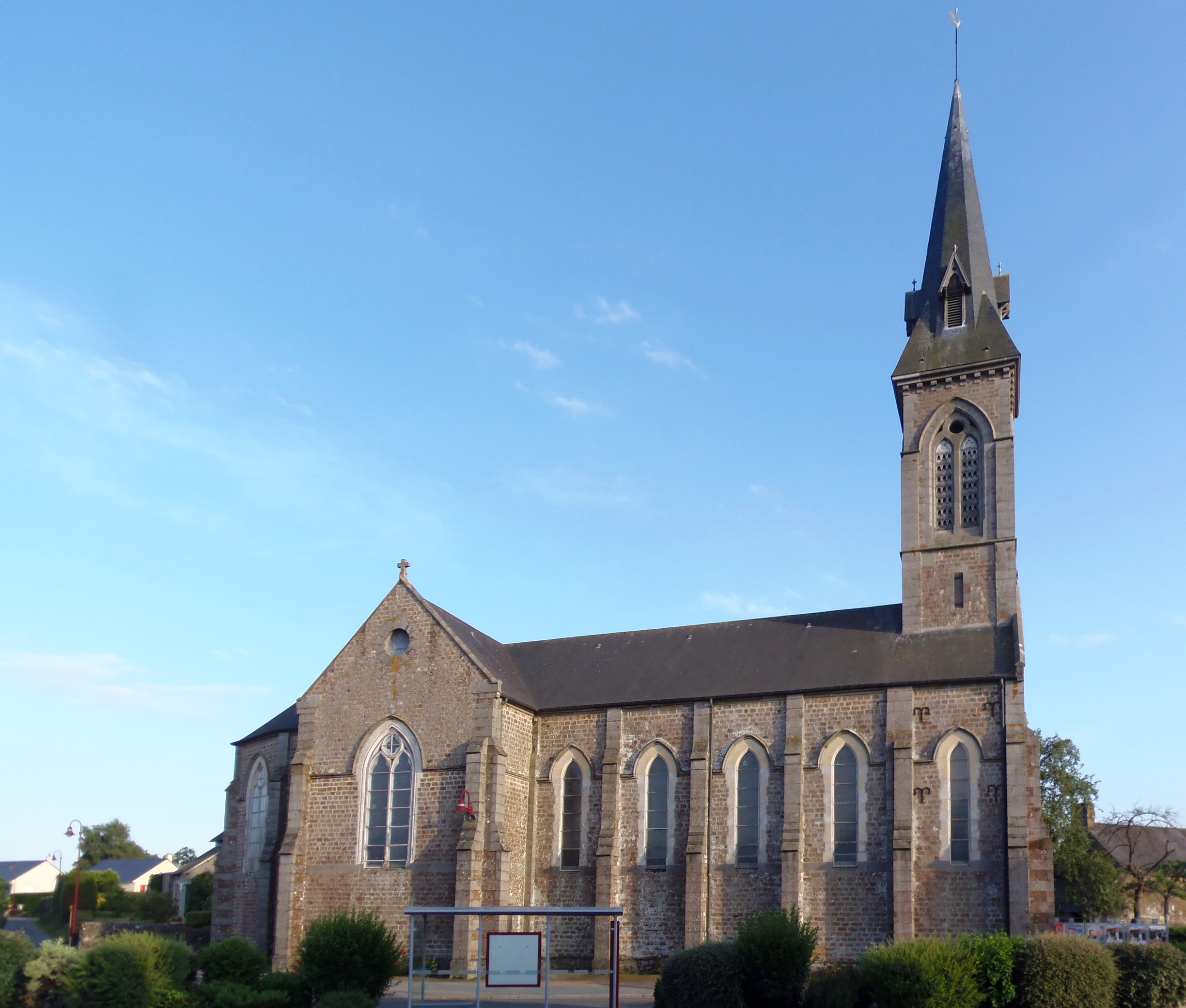
Ronfeugerai church

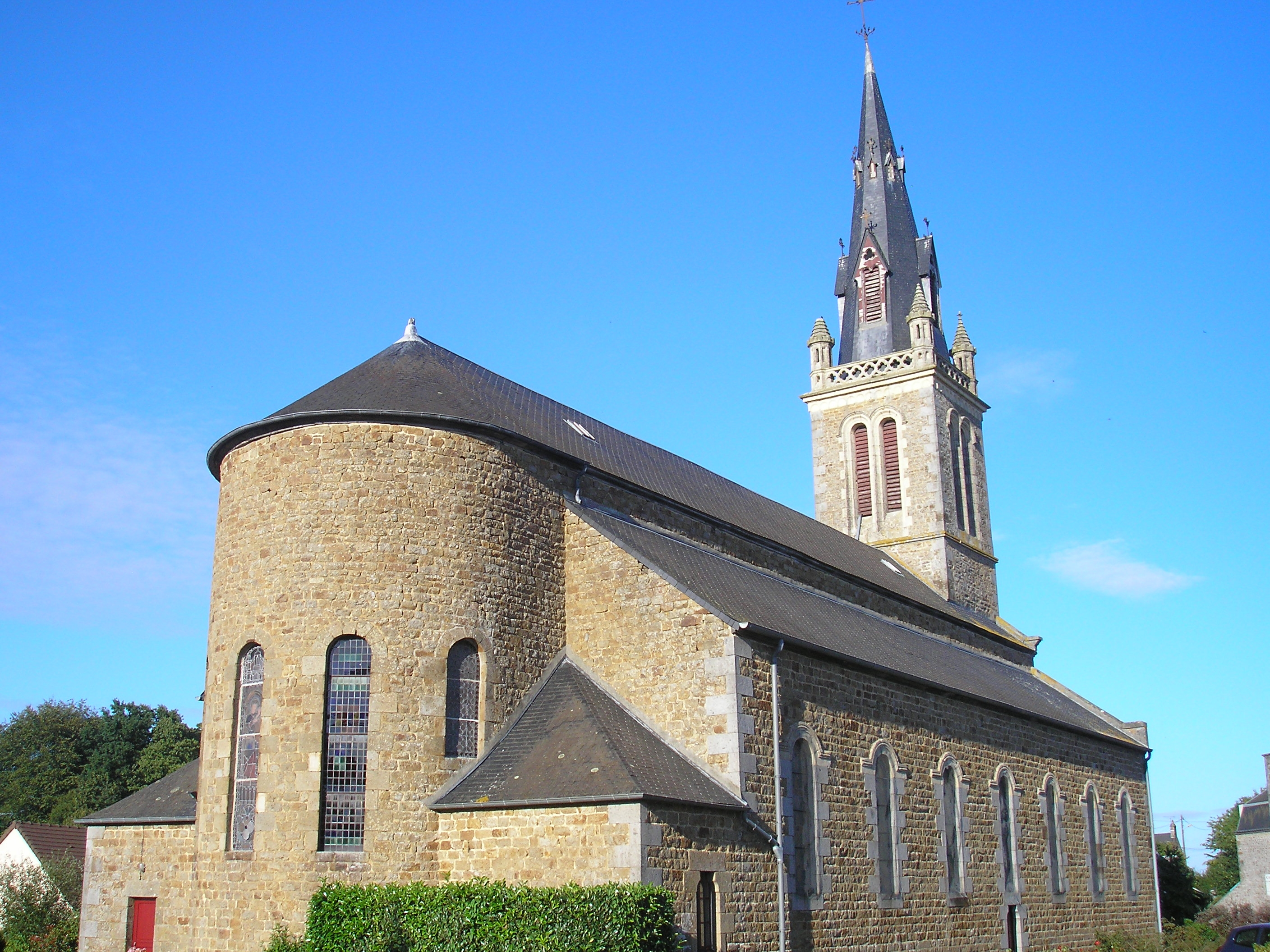
Segrie Fontaine church

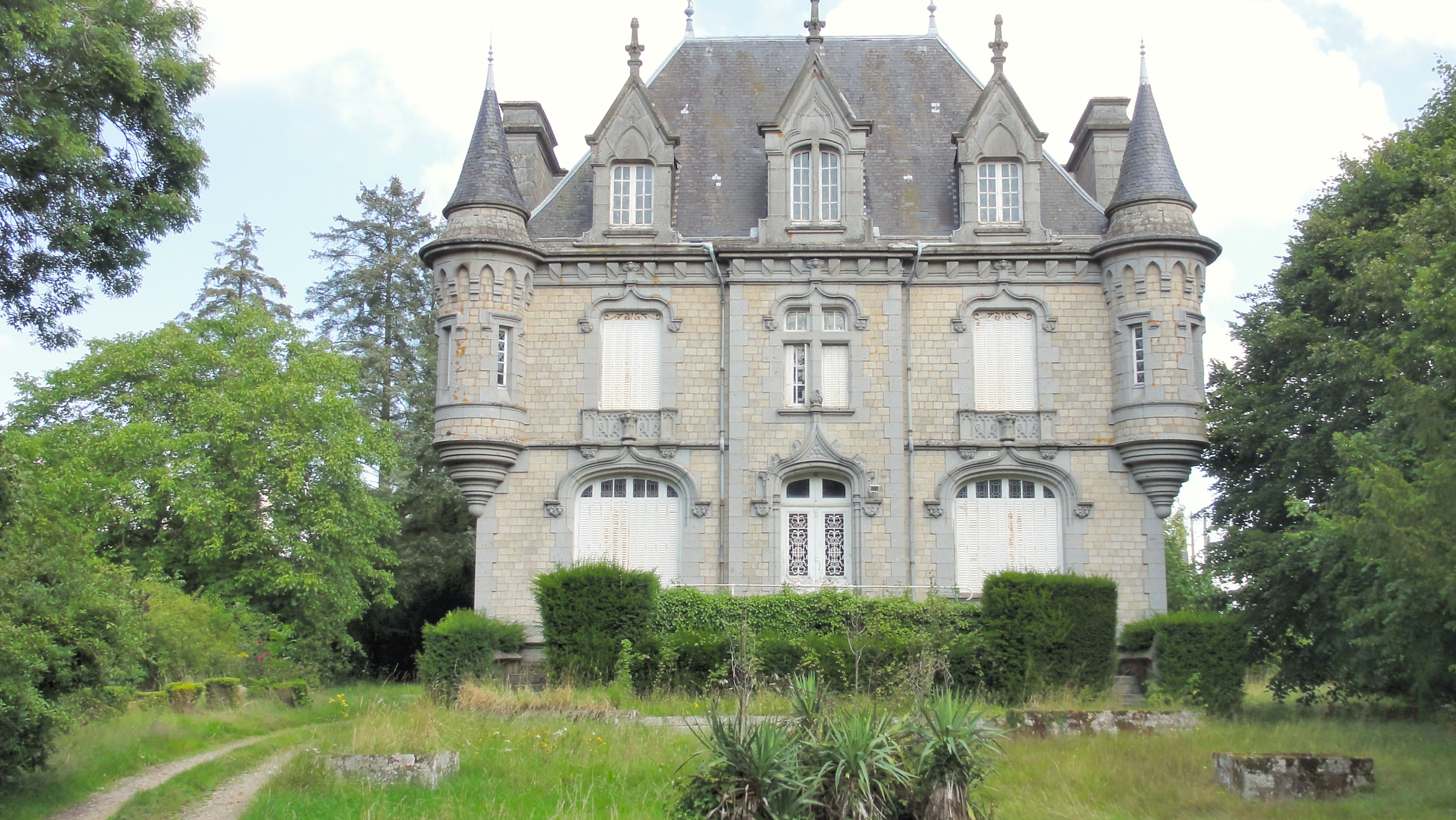
Chateau de Segrie

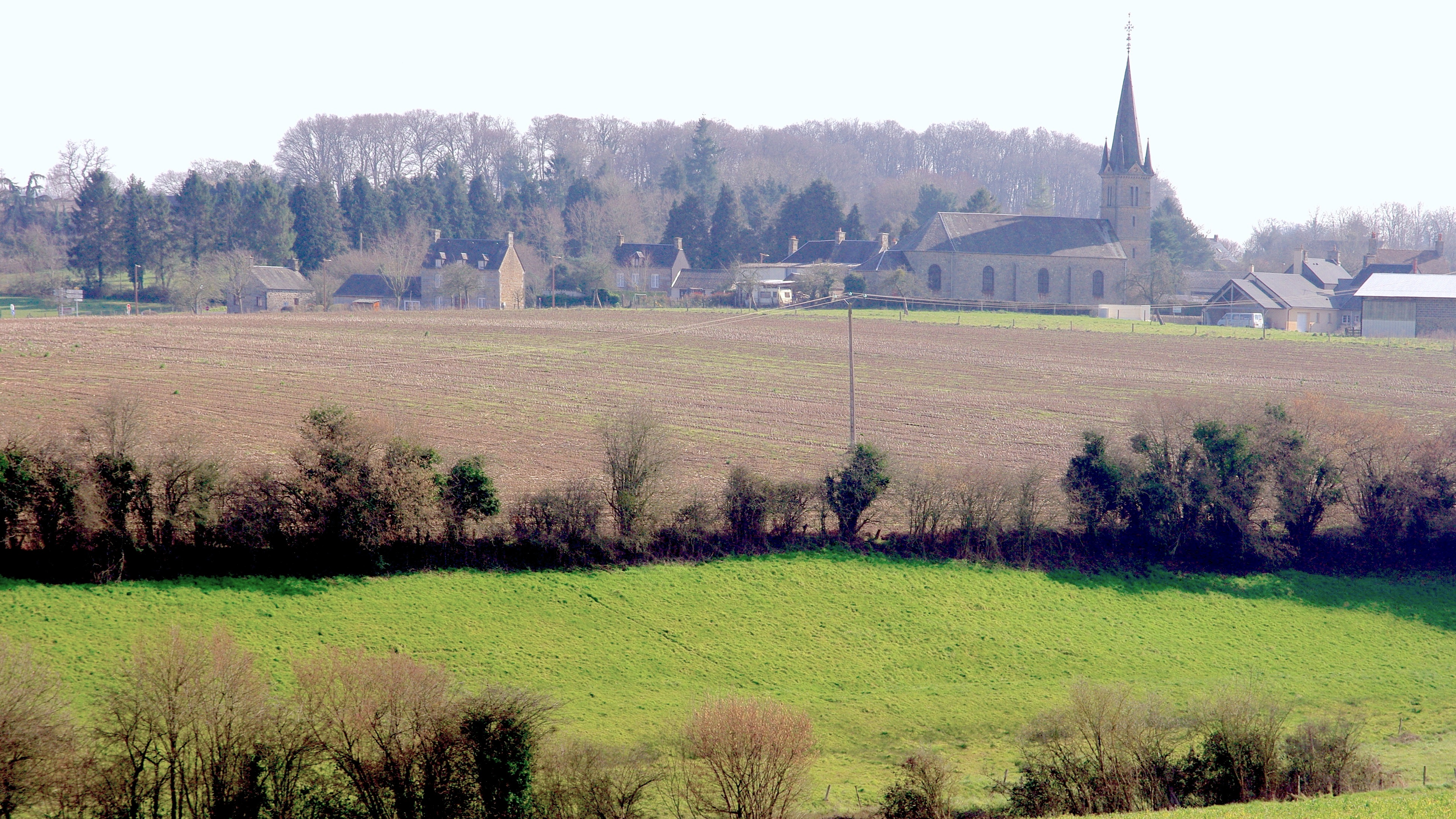
Taillebois

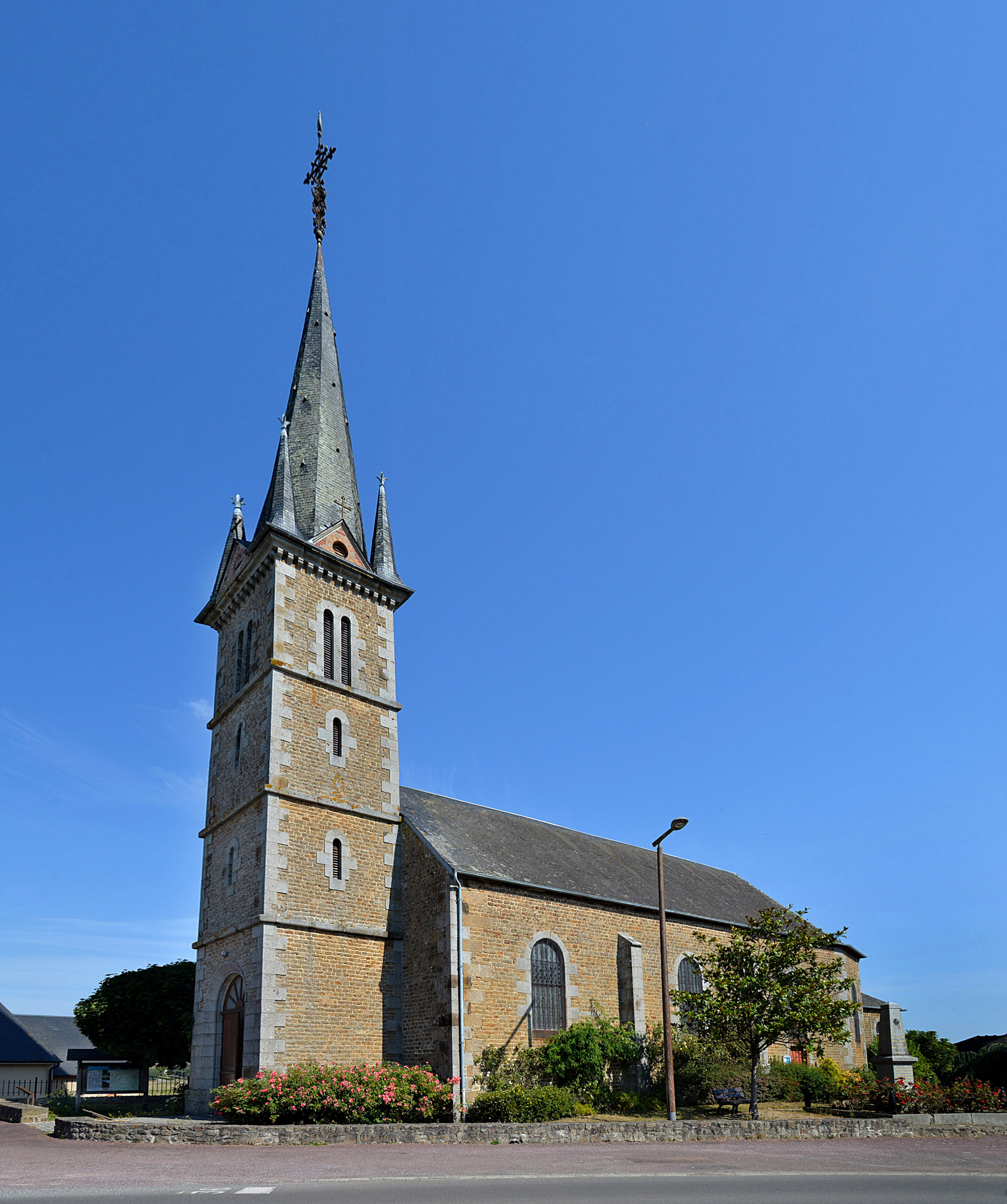
church of Saint-Laurent in Taillebois

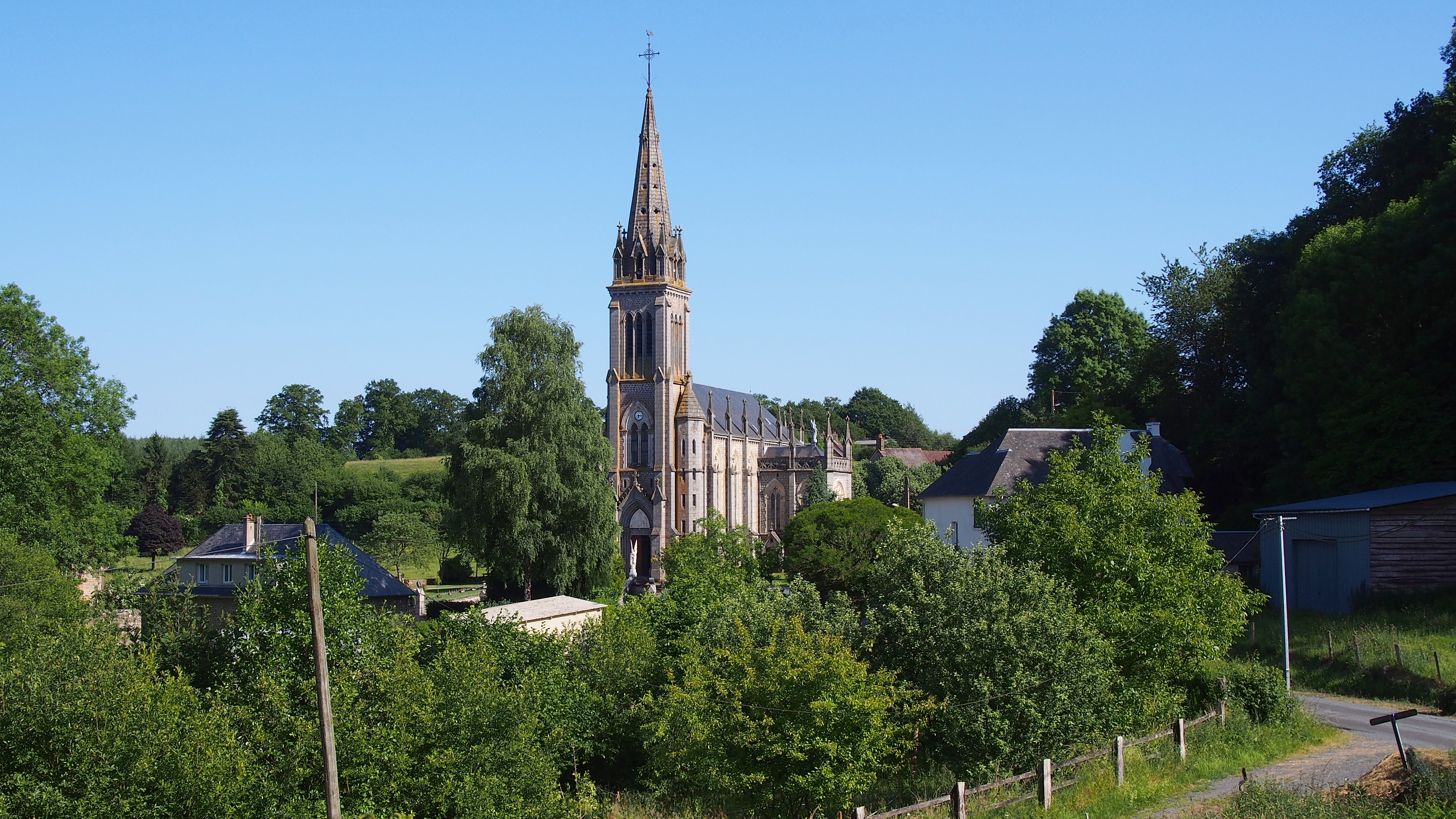
Les Tourailles Basilique

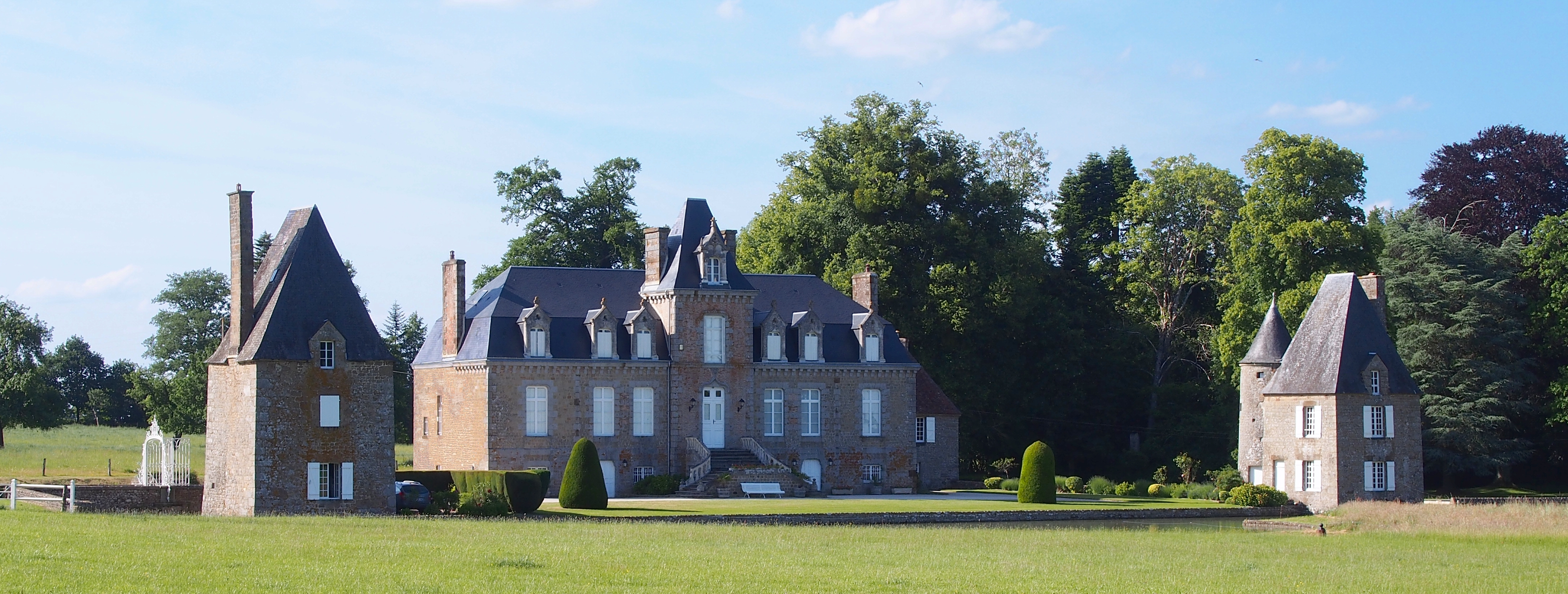
Les Tourailles Chateau

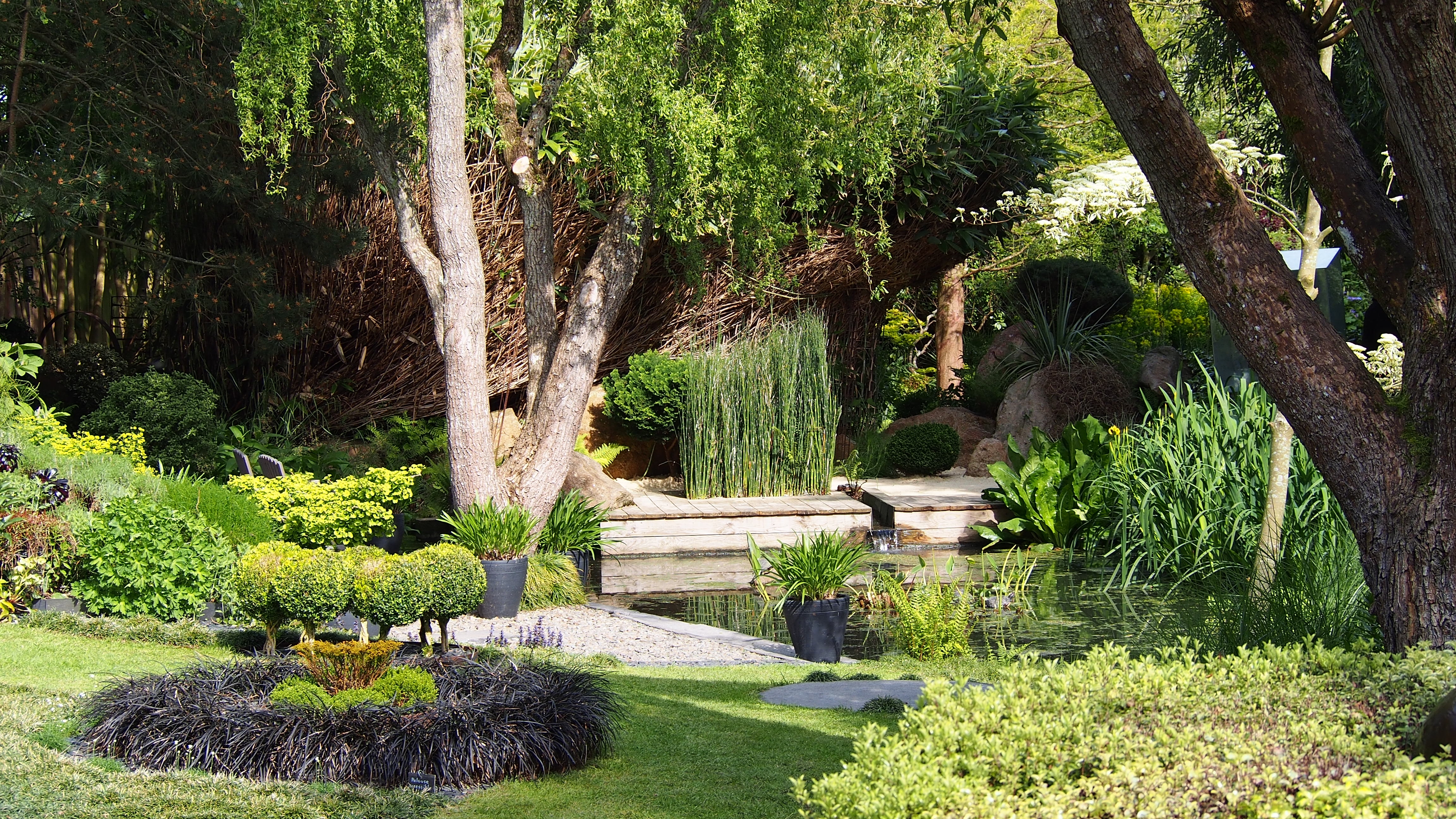
Jardin Interieur A Ciel ouvert

== Notable people ==
- Antoine de Montchrestien -(c. 1575 - 1621) a French soldier, dramatist, adventurer and economist, died here in Les Tourailles.
- Myriam Colombi - (1940 – 2021) a film, television and stage actress was born here in La Carneille.

== Twin towns ==
- Schöppenstedt, Germany.
- Bromyard, England.

== See also ==
- Communes of the Orne department
