= Les Tourailles =

- Part of Athis-Val-de-Rouvre
- Location of Les Tourailles
- Location within France Location within Normandy
- Coordinates: 48°46′00″N 0°24′00″W
- Country: France
- Region: Normandy
- Department: Orne
- Arrondissement: Argentan
- Canton: Athis-de-l'Orne
- Commune: Athis-Val-de-Rouvre
- Area^{1}: 2.46 km^{2} (0.95 sq mi)
- Elevation: 190 m (620 ft)
- Highest elevation: 254 m (833 ft)
- Lowest elevation: 159 m (522 ft)
- Population (2023): 84
  - Density: 34/km^{2} (88/sq mi)
- Time zone: UTC+01:00 (CET)
  - Summer (DST): UTC+02:00 (CEST)
- Postal code: 61100
- ^{1} French Land Register data, which excludes lakes, ponds, glaciers > 1 km^{2} (0.386 sq mi or 247 acres) and river estuaries.

Les Tourailles (French pronunciation: [le tuʁaj]) is a commune in the Orne département and the region of Normandy in north-western France. On 1 January 2016, it was merged into the new commune of Athis-Val-de-Rouvre. The former commune is part of the area known as Suisse Normande.

== Geography ==
- Watercourses: The river Rouvre.

== History ==
- Notre-Dame de la Recouvrance chapel, departure point for pilgrimages since the 9th century.

== Administration ==
List of Mayors
Start	End	Name	Party
?	March 2001	Paul Le Secq	-
March 2001	2016	Odile Gauquelin	Independent

== Population ==
Historical population
Year	Pop.	±% p.a.
1962	102	—
1968	84	−3.18%
1975	74	−1.79%
1982	96	+3.79%
1990	102	+0.76%
1999	67	−4.56%
2007	75	+1.42%
2012	71	−1.09%
2023	84	+1.54%
Source: EHESS and INSEE (2007-2023)

== Sites and monuments ==
- Basilica of the Notre-Dame de la Recouvrance chapel, completed in 1939.
- 16th-century castle keep, a good ensemble with two pavilions.
- Bridge of Tourailles, the remains of a Roman bridge.
- Pilgrimages on 8 September and 31 May.

== People associated with Les Tourailles ==
- Antoine de Montchrestien (born Falaise, Calvados 1570, died Les Tourailles 1621). Poet and author. Known by the name of 'Vatteville'. He tried to revive the religious wars of the sixteenth century but was killed when making a traveller's stop in Les Tourailles.

== See also ==
- Communes of the Orne department
