= Bréel =

- Part of Athis-Val-de-Rouvre
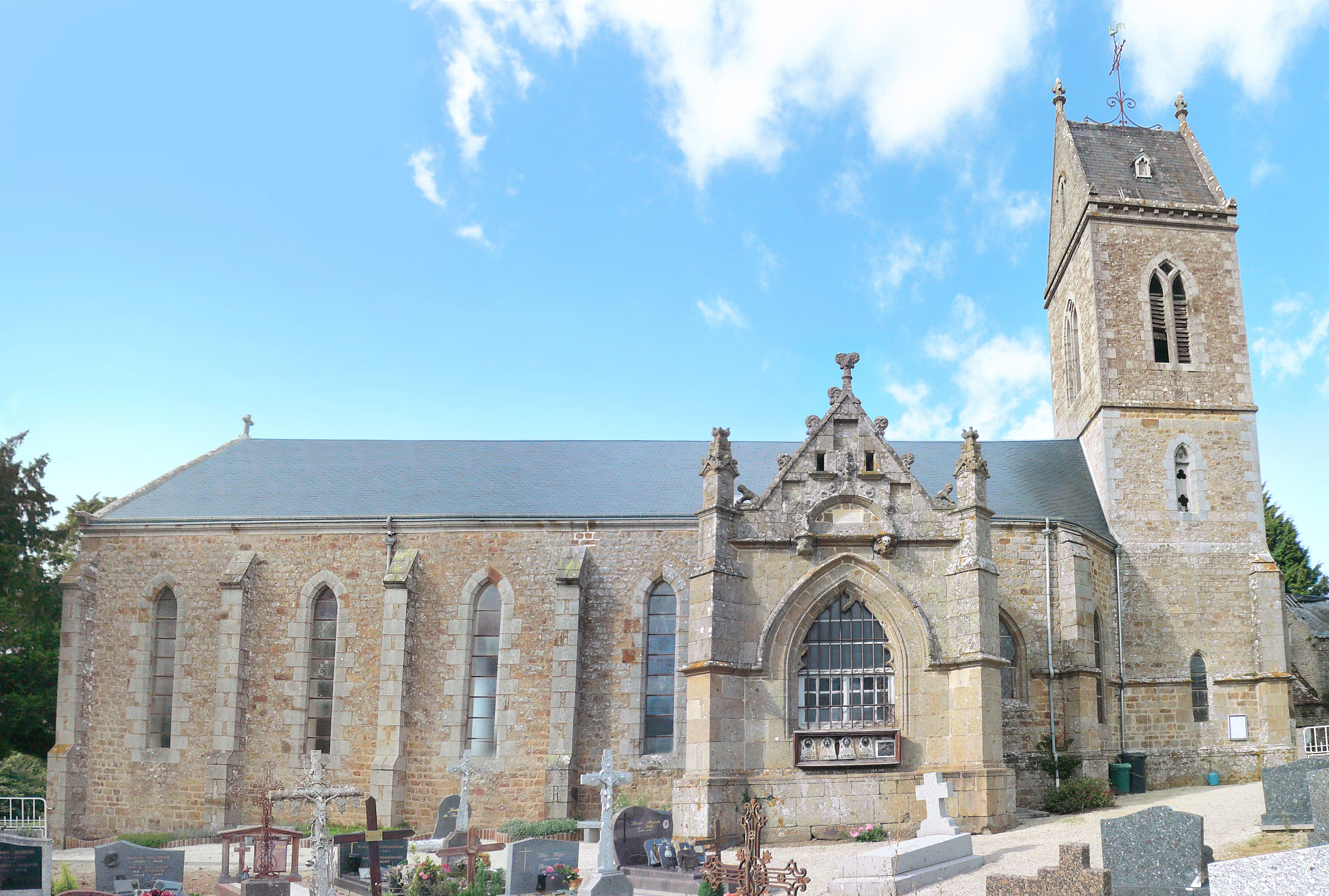
- Church of Saint-Pierre and Saint-Paul of Bréel.
- Location of Bréel
- Location within France Location within Normandy
- Coordinates: 48°48′50″N 0°23′21″W
- Country: France
- Region: Normandy
- Department: Orne
- Arrondissement: Argentan
- Canton: Athis-de-l'Orne
- Commune: Athis-Val-de-Rouvre
- Area^{1}: 3.71 km^{2} (1.43 sq mi)
- Elevation: 239 m (784 ft)
- Highest elevation: 241 m (791 ft)
- Lowest elevation: 73 m (240 ft)
- Population (2023): 142
  - Density: 38.3/km^{2} (99.1/sq mi)
- Time zone: UTC+01:00 (CET)
  - Summer (DST): UTC+02:00 (CEST)
- Postal code: 61100
- ^{1} French Land Register data, which excludes lakes, ponds, glaciers > 1 km^{2} (0.386 sq mi or 247 acres) and river estuaries.

Bréel is a commune in the Orne department in northwestern France. On 1 January 2016, it was merged into the new commune of Athis-Val-de-Rouvre. The former commune is part of the area known as Suisse Normande.

== See also ==
- Communes of the Orne department
