= Taillebois =

- Part of Athis-Val-de-Rouvre
- Location of Taillebois
- Location within France Location within Normandy
- Coordinates: 48°48′09″N 0°25′59″W
- Country: France
- Region: Normandy
- Department: Orne
- Arrondissement: Argentan
- Canton: Athis-de-l'Orne
- Commune: Athis-Val-de-Rouvre
- Area^{1}: 5.51 km^{2} (2.13 sq mi)
- Elevation: 173 m (568 ft)
- Highest elevation: 206 m (676 ft)
- Lowest elevation: 110 m (360 ft)
- Population (2022): 137
  - Density: 24.9/km^{2} (64.4/sq mi)
- Time zone: UTC+01:00 (CET)
  - Summer (DST): UTC+02:00 (CEST)
- Postal code: 61100
- ^{1} French Land Register data, which excludes lakes, ponds, glaciers > 1 km^{2} (0.386 sq mi or 247 acres) and river estuaries.

Taillebois is a commune in the Orne department in north-western France. On 1 January 2016, it was merged into the new commune of Athis-Val-de-Rouvre. The commune is part of the area known as Suisse Normande.

== See also ==
- Communes of the Orne department
