= Ronfeugerai =

- Part of Athis-Val-de-Rouvre
- Location of Ronfeugerai
- Location within France Location within Normandy
- Coordinates: 48°46′55″N 0°28′29″W
- Country: France
- Region: Normandy
- Department: Orne
- Arrondissement: Argentan
- Canton: Athis-de-l'Orne
- Commune: Athis-Val-de-Rouvre
- Area^{1}: 6.57 km^{2} (2.54 sq mi)
- Elevation: 210 m (690 ft)
- Highest elevation: 258 m (846 ft)
- Lowest elevation: 179 m (587 ft)
- Population (2022): 324
  - Density: 49.3/km^{2} (128/sq mi)
- Time zone: UTC+01:00 (CET)
  - Summer (DST): UTC+02:00 (CEST)
- Postal code: 61100
- ^{1} French Land Register data, which excludes lakes, ponds, glaciers > 1 km^{2} (0.386 sq mi or 247 acres) and river estuaries.

Ronfeugerai is a commune in the Orne department in north-western France. On 1 January 2016, it was merged into the new commune of Athis-Val-de-Rouvre. The former commune is part of the area known as Suisse Normande.

== See also ==
- Communes of the Orne department
