= Notre-Dame-du-Rocher =

- Part of Athis-Val-de-Rouvre
- Location of Notre-Dame-du-Rocher
- Location within France Location within Normandy
- Coordinates: 48°47′45″N 0°24′19″W
- Country: France
- Region: Normandy
- Department: Orne
- Arrondissement: Argentan
- Canton: Athis-de-l'Orne
- Commune: Athis-Val-de-Rouvre
- Area^{1}: 3.43 km^{2} (1.32 sq mi)
- Elevation: 280 m (920 ft)
- Highest elevation: 200 m (660 ft)
- Lowest elevation: 99 m (325 ft)
- Population (2022): 58
  - Density: 17/km^{2} (44/sq mi)
- Time zone: UTC+01:00 (CET)
  - Summer (DST): UTC+02:00 (CEST)
- Postal code: 61100
- ^{1} French Land Register data, which excludes lakes, ponds, glaciers > 1 km^{2} (0.386 sq mi or 247 acres) and river estuaries.

Notre-Dame-du-Rocher (French pronunciation: [nɔtʁ dam dy ʁɔʃe]) is a commune in the Orne department in north-western France. On 1 January 2016, it was merged into the new commune of Athis-Val-de-Rouvre. The former commune is part of the area known as Suisse Normande.

== See also ==
- Communes of the Orne department
