= Saint-Denis-sur-Huisne =

- Commune
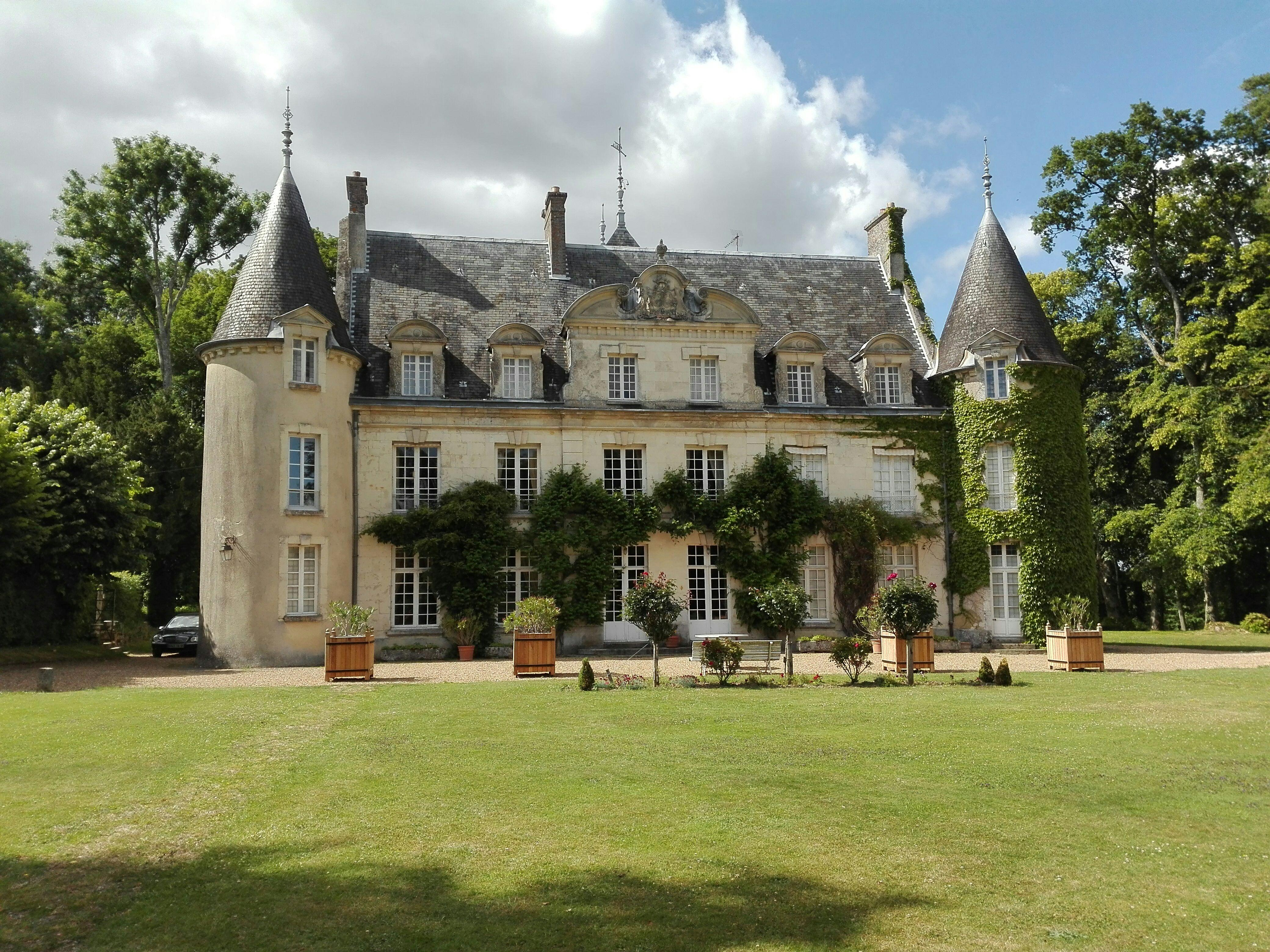
- The chateau in Saint-Denis-sur-Huisne
- Location of Saint-Denis-sur-Huisne
- Location within France Location within Normandy
- Coordinates: 48°28′10″N 0°32′37″E
- Country: France
- Region: Normandy
- Department: Orne
- Arrondissement: Mortagne-au-Perche
- Canton: Mortagne-au-Perche
- Intercommunality: Pays de Mortagne-au-Perche

Government
  - Mayor (2020–2026): Valérie Yell
- Area^{1}: 4.59 km^{2} (1.77 sq mi)
- Elevation: 159 m (522 ft)
- Highest elevation: 190 m (620 ft)
- Lowest elevation: 147 m (482 ft)
- Population (2023): 59
  - Density: 13/km^{2} (33/sq mi)
- Time zone: UTC+01:00 (CET)
  - Summer (DST): UTC+02:00 (CEST)
- INSEE/Postal code: 61381 /61400
- ^{1} French Land Register data, which excludes lakes, ponds, glaciers > 1 km^{2} (0.386 sq mi or 247 acres) and river estuaries.

Saint-Denis-sur-Huisne (French pronunciation: [sɛ̃ dəni syʁ ɥin], literally Saint-Denis on Huisne) is a commune in the Orne department in north-western France.

== Geography ==
The commune is made up of the following collection of villages and hamlets, Les Rouchères and Saint-Denis-sur-Huisne.

The river Huisne flows through the commune.

== Points of interest ==
=== National heritage sites ===
- Church of Saint-Denis-sur-Huisne is a twelfth century church which was registered as a Monument historique in 2004.

== See also ==
- Communes of the Orne department
