= Corbon, Orne =

Corbon
- Commune
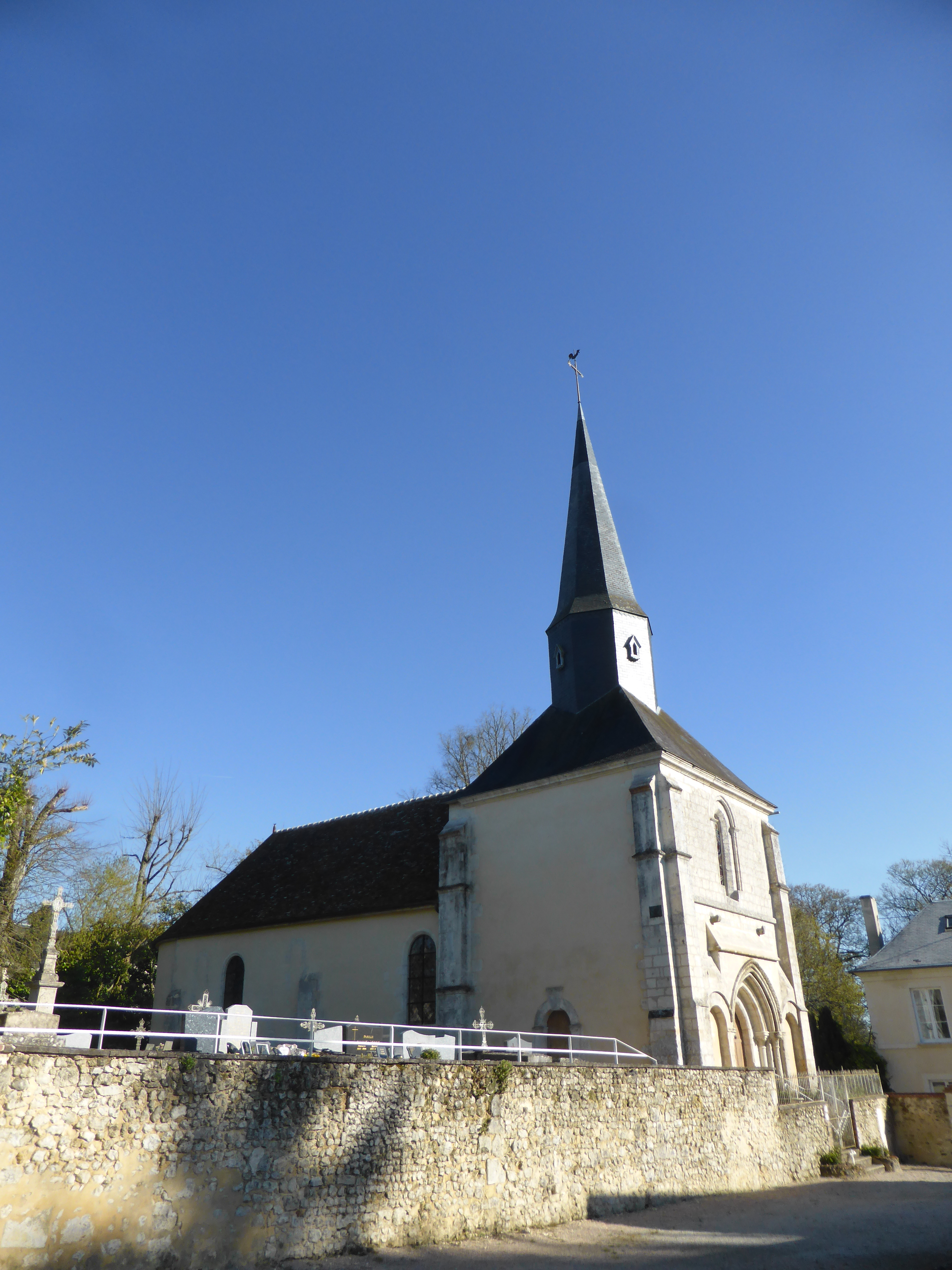
- The church in Corbon
- Location of Corbon
- Location within France Location within Normandy
- Coordinates: 48°27′18″N 0°37′41″E
- Country: France
- Region: Normandy
- Department: Orne
- Arrondissement: Mortagne-au-Perche
- Canton: Mortagne-au-Perche

Government
  - Mayor (2020–2026): Sarah Falconnet
- Area^{1}: 8.38 km^{2} (3.24 sq mi)
- Elevation: 122 m (400 ft)
- Highest elevation: 222 m (728 ft)
- Lowest elevation: 132 m (433 ft)
- Population (2023): 111
  - Density: 13.2/km^{2} (34.3/sq mi)
- Time zone: UTC+01:00 (CET)
  - Summer (DST): UTC+02:00 (CEST)
- INSEE/Postal code: 61118 /61400
- ^{1} French Land Register data, which excludes lakes, ponds, glaciers > 1 km^{2} (0.386 sq mi or 247 acres) and river estuaries.

Corbon (French pronunciation: [kɔʁbɔ̃]) is a commune in the Orne department in north-western France.

== Geography ==
The commune is made up of the following collection of villages and hamlets, La Blandelière, Corbon and Le Breuil.

The Commune along with another 70 communes shares part of a 47,681 hectare, Natura 2000 conservation area, called the Forêts et étangs du Perche.

Two rivers Huisne and La Vilette flow through the commune.

== Points of interest ==
=== National heritage sites ===
- Manoir de la Vove, fifteenth century manor house that was registered as a Monument historique 1974.

== See also ==
- Communes of the Orne department
