= Comblot =

- Commune
- Location of Comblot
- Location within France Location within Normandy
- Coordinates: 48°27′46″N 0°35′41″E
- Country: France
- Region: Normandy
- Department: Orne
- Arrondissement: Mortagne-au-Perche
- Canton: Mortagne-au-Perche
- Intercommunality: Pays de Mortagne au Perche

Government
  - Mayor (2020–2026): Xavier Goutte
- Area^{1}: 4.31 km^{2} (1.66 sq mi)
- Elevation: 156 m (512 ft)
- Highest elevation: 177 m (581 ft)
- Lowest elevation: 139 m (456 ft)
- Population (2023): 58
  - Density: 13/km^{2} (35/sq mi)
- Time zone: UTC+01:00 (CET)
  - Summer (DST): UTC+02:00 (CEST)
- INSEE/Postal code: 61113 /61400
- ^{1} French Land Register data, which excludes lakes, ponds, glaciers > 1 km^{2} (0.386 sq mi or 247 acres) and river estuaries.

Comblot (French pronunciation: [kɔ̃blo]) is a commune in the Orne department in north-western France.

== Geography ==
The commune is made up of the following collection of villages and hamlets, Comblot, La Prévoté and L'Anglaicherie.

The river Huisne flows through the commune. In addition La Chippe and Le Chêne Galon are another two watercourses that traverses through the commune.

== See also ==
- Communes of the Orne department
