= Arrondissement of Mortagne-au-Perche =

Coordinates: 48°31′15″N 0°32′34″E

Mortagne-au-Perche
- Arrondissement
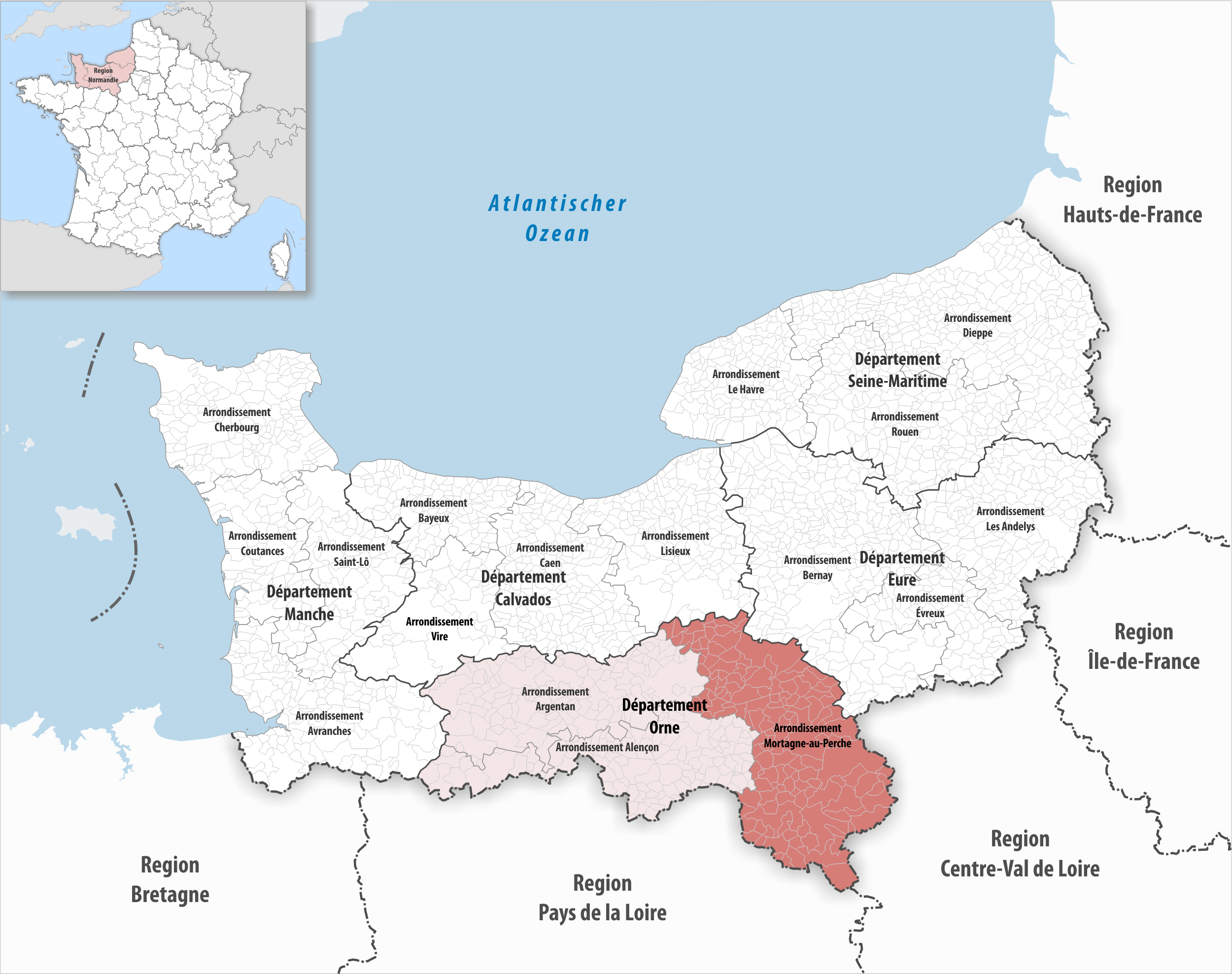
- Location within the region Normandy
- Country: France
- Region: Normandy
- Department: Orne
- No. of communes: {{{nbcomm}}}
- Area: 2,650.8 km^{2} (1,023.5 sq mi)
- Population (2023): 83,629
  - Density: 31.549/km^{2} (81.710/sq mi)
- INSEE code: 613

The arrondissement of Mortagne-au-Perche is an arrondissement of France in the Orne department in the Normandy region. It has 147 communes. Its population is 84,469 (2021), and its area is 2,650.8 km^{2} (1,023.5 sq mi).

== Composition ==
The communes of the arrondissement of Mortagne-au-Perche, and their INSEE codes, are:

1. L'Aigle (61214)
2. Appenai-sous-Bellême (61005)
3. Les Aspres (61422)
4. Aube (61008)
5. Aubry-le-Panthou
6. Auguaise (61012)
7. Avernes-Saint-Gourgon
8. Bazoches-sur-Hoëne (61029)
9. Beaufai (61032)
10. Beaulieu (61034)
11. Belforêt-en-Perche (61196)
12. Bellavilliers (61037)
13. Bellême (61038)
14. Bellou-le-Trichard (61041)
15. Berd'huis (61043)
16. Bizou (61046)
17. Boëcé (61048)
18. Bonnefoi (61052)
19. Bonsmoulins (61053)
20. Le Bosc-Renoult
21. Brethel (61060)
22. Bretoncelles (61061)
23. Camembert
24. Canapville
25. Ceton (61079)
26. Les Champeaux
27. Champeaux-sur-Sarthe (61087)
28. Champ-Haut
29. Champosoult
30. Chandai (61092)
31. La Chapelle-Montligeon (61097)
32. La Chapelle-Souëf (61099)
33. La Chapelle-Viel (61100)
34. Charencey (61429)
35. Chaumont
36. Chemilli (61105)
37. Cisai-Saint-Aubin
38. Comblot (61113)
39. Corbon (61118)
40. Coulimer (61121)
41. Coulmer
42. Courgeon (61129)
43. Courgeoût (61130)
44. Cour-Maugis-sur-Huisne (61050)
45. Croisilles
46. Crouttes
47. Crulai (61140)
48. Dame-Marie (61142)
49. Échauffour
50. Écorcei (61151)
51. Fay (61159)
52. Feings (61160)
53. La Ferrière-au-Doyen (61162)
54. La Ferté-en-Ouche
55. La Fresnaie-Fayel
56. Fresnay-le-Samson
57. Gacé
58. Les Genettes (61187)
59. La Gonfrière
60. Guerquesalles
61. L'Hôme-Chamondot (61206)
62. Igé (61207)
63. Irai (61208)
64. Lignères
65. Loisail (61229)
66. Longny-les-Villages (61230)
67. La Madeleine-Bouvet (61241)
68. Le Mage (61242)
69. Mahéru (61244)
70. Mardilly
71. Mauves-sur-Huisne (61255)
72. Le Ménil-Bérard (61259)
73. Ménil-Froger
74. Ménil-Hubert-en-Exmes
75. Le Ménil-Vicomte
76. Les Menus (61274)
77. Merlerault-le-Pin (61275)
78. La Mesnière (61277)
79. Montgaudry (61286)
80. Mortagne-au-Perche (61293)
81. Moulins-la-Marche (61297)
82. Moutiers-au-Perche (61300)
83. Neuville-sur-Touques
84. Orgères
85. Origny-le-Roux (61319)
86. Parfondeval (61322)
87. Le Pas-Saint-l'Homer (61323)
88. Perche-en-Nocé (61309)
89. Pervenchères (61327)
90. Le Pin-la-Garenne (61329)
91. Planches
92. Pontchardon
93. Pouvrai (61336)
94. Rai (61342)
95. Rémalard-en-Perche (61345)
96. Le Renouard
97. Résenlieu
98. Réveillon (61348)
99. Roiville
100. Sablons-sur-Huisne (61116)
101. Saint-Aquilin-de-Corbion (61363)
102. Saint-Aubin-de-Bonneval
103. Saint-Aubin-de-Courteraie (61367)
104. Saint-Cyr-la-Rosière (61379)
105. Saint-Denis-sur-Huisne (61381)
106. Sainte-Céronne-lès-Mortagne (61373)
107. Sainte-Gauburge-Sainte-Colombe
108. Saint-Evroult-de-Montfort
109. Saint-Evroult-Notre-Dame-du-Bois
110. Saint-Fulgent-des-Ormes (61388)
111. Saint-Germain-d'Aunay
112. Saint-Germain-de-Clairefeuille
113. Saint-Germain-de-la-Coudre (61394)
114. Saint-Germain-de-Martigny (61396)
115. Saint-Germain-des-Grois (61395)
116. Saint-Hilaire-le-Châtel (61404)
117. Saint-Hilaire-sur-Erre (61405)
118. Saint-Hilaire-sur-Risle (61406)
119. Saint-Jouin-de-Blavou (61411)
120. Saint-Langis-lès-Mortagne (61414)
121. Saint-Mard-de-Réno (61418)
122. Saint-Martin-d'Écublei (61423)
123. Saint-Martin-des-Pézerits (61425)
124. Saint-Martin-du-Vieux-Bellême (61426)
125. Saint-Michel-Tubœuf (61432)
126. Saint-Nicolas-de-Sommaire
127. Saint-Ouen-de-Sécherouvre (61438)
128. Saint-Ouen-sur-Iton (61440)
129. Saint-Pierre-des-Loges (61446)
130. Saint-Pierre-la-Bruyère (61448)
131. Saint-Sulpice-sur-Risle (61456)
132. Saint-Symphorien-des-Bruyères (61457)
133. Le Sap-André
134. Sap-en-Auge
135. Soligny-la-Trappe (61475)
136. Suré (61476)
137. Ticheville
138. Touquettes
139. Tourouvre au Perche (61491)
140. La Trinité-des-Laitiers
141. Val-au-Perche (61484)
142. Vaunoise (61498)
143. La Ventrouze (61500)
144. Verrières (61501)
145. Villiers-sous-Mortagne (61507)
146. Vimoutiers
147. Vitrai-sous-Laigle (61510)

== History ==
The arrondissement of Mortagne-au-Perche was created in 1800, disbanded in 1926 and restored in 1942. At the January 2017 reorganisation of the arrondissements of Orne, it gained 49 communes from the arrondissement of Argentan and one commune from the arrondissement of Alençon, and it lost five communes to the arrondissement of Alençon.

As a result of the reorganisation of the cantons of France which came into effect in 2015, the borders of the cantons are no longer related to the borders of the arrondissements. The cantons of the arrondissement of Mortagne-au-Perche were, as of January 2015:

1. L'Aigle-Est
2. L'Aigle-Ouest
3. Bazoches-sur-Hoëne
4. Bellême
5. Longny-au-Perche
6. Mortagne-au-Perche
7. Moulins-la-Marche
8. Nocé
9. Pervenchères
10. Rémalard
11. Le Theil
12. Tourouvre
