= Parfondeval =

Parfondeval may refer to the following places in France:

- Parfondeval, Aisne
- Parfondeval, Orne
