= Réveillon, Orne =

Réveillon
- Commune
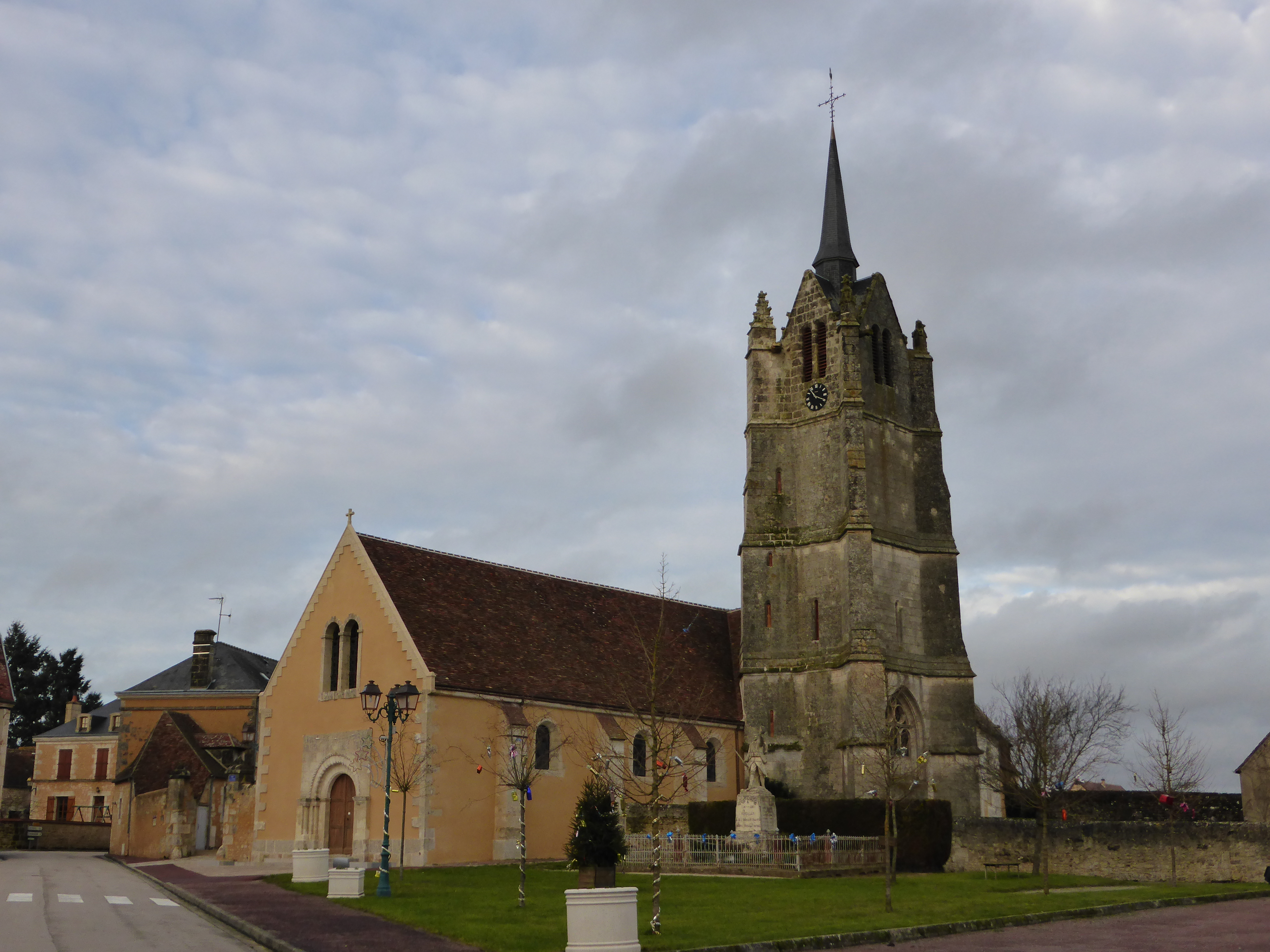
- The church in Réveillon
- Location of Réveillon
- Location within France Location within Normandy
- Coordinates: 48°28′49″N 0°33′36″E
- Country: France
- Region: Normandy
- Department: Orne
- Arrondissement: Mortagne-au-Perche
- Canton: Mortagne-au-Perche
- Intercommunality: Pays de Mortagne au Perche

Government
  - Mayor (2020–2026): Jean-Claude Mauny
- Area^{1}: 11.66 km^{2} (4.50 sq mi)
- Elevation: 179 m (587 ft)
- Highest elevation: 191 m (627 ft)
- Lowest elevation: 143 m (469 ft)
- Population (2023): 349
  - Density: 29.9/km^{2} (77.5/sq mi)
- Time zone: UTC+01:00 (CET)
  - Summer (DST): UTC+02:00 (CEST)
- INSEE/Postal code: 61348 /61400
- ^{1} French Land Register data, which excludes lakes, ponds, glaciers > 1 km^{2} (0.386 sq mi or 247 acres) and river estuaries.

Réveillon (French pronunciation: [ʁevɛjɔ̃]) is a commune in the Orne department in north-western France.

== Geography ==
The commune is made up of the following collection of villages and hamlets, Les Feugerets, La Perrotière, Réveillon and La Maricottière.

The river Huisne flows through the commune.

== Population ==
Historical population
Year	Pop.	±% p.a.
1968	402	—
1975	381	−0.76%
1982	341	−1.57%
1990	349	+0.29%
1999	288	−2.11%
2007	353	+2.58%
2012	359	+0.34%
2017	374	+0.82%
2023	349	−1.15%
Source: INSEE

== Notable buildings and places ==
Bourdonniere garden is a 5000 m^{2} nature garden that was made open to the public.

=== National heritage sites ===
Manoir des Rosiers is a 16th-century mansion that was built with a defensive tower, a typical build of the region between the Hundred Years' War and mid 16th Century, that was classed as a Monument historique on 1992.

== See also ==
- Communes of the Orne department
