= Sainte-Céronne-lès-Mortagne =

- Commune
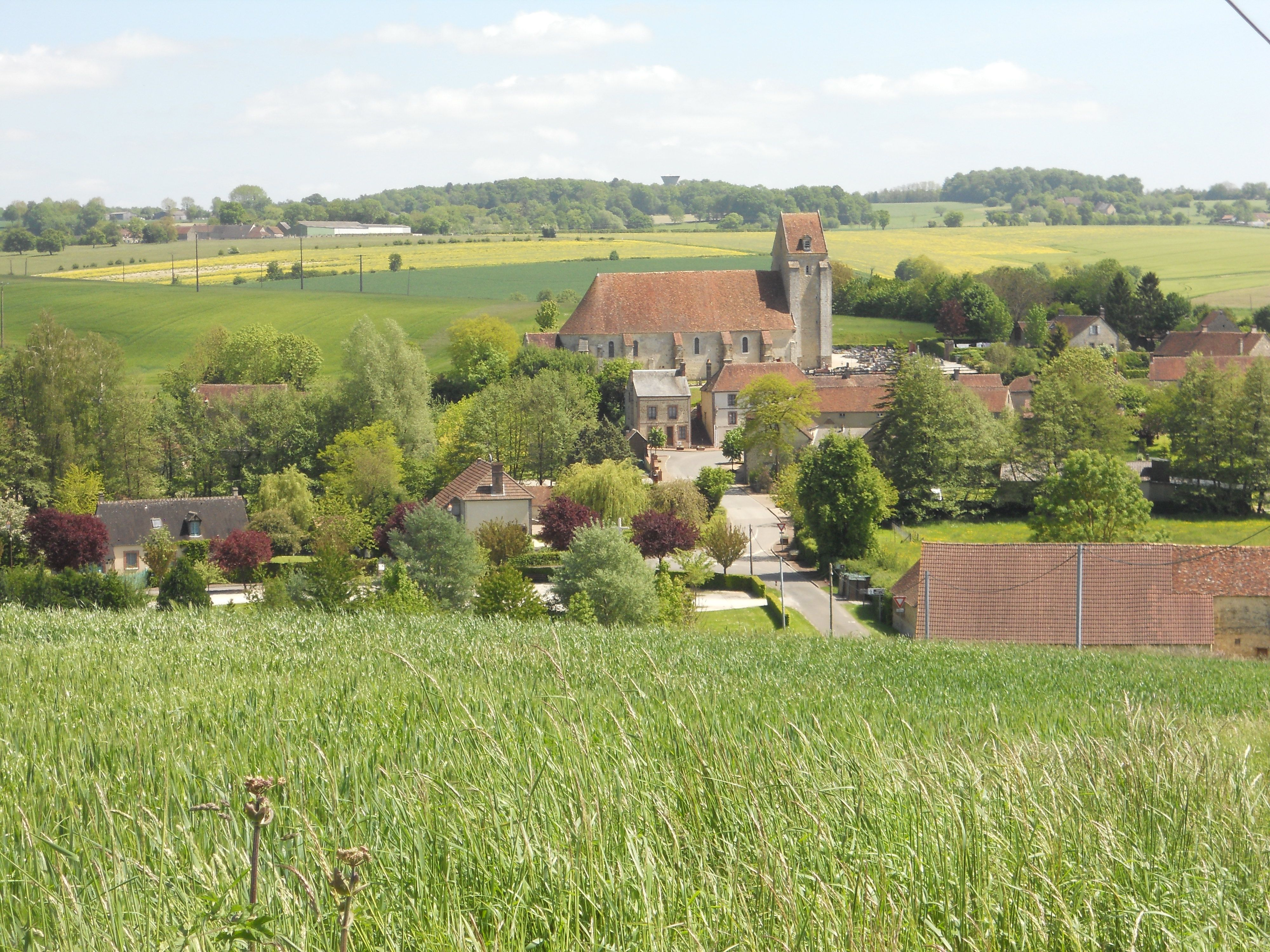
- A general view of Sainte-Céronne-lès-Mortagne

- Coat of arms
- Location of Sainte-Céronne-lès-Mortagne
- Location within France Location within Normandy
- Coordinates: 48°34′07″N 0°32′01″E
- Country: France
- Region: Normandy
- Department: Orne
- Arrondissement: Mortagne-au-Perche
- Canton: Mortagne-au-Perche
- Intercommunality: Pays de Mortagne au Perche

Government
  - Mayor (2020–2026): Dominique Ragot
- Area^{1}: 12.55 km^{2} (4.85 sq mi)
- Elevation: 186 m (610 ft)
- Highest elevation: 297 m (974 ft)
- Lowest elevation: 168 m (551 ft)
- Population (2023): 251
  - Density: 20.0/km^{2} (51.8/sq mi)
- Time zone: UTC+01:00 (CET)
  - Summer (DST): UTC+02:00 (CEST)
- INSEE/Postal code: 61373 /61380
- ^{1} French Land Register data, which excludes lakes, ponds, glaciers > 1 km^{2} (0.386 sq mi or 247 acres) and river estuaries.

Sainte-Céronne-lès-Mortagne (French pronunciation: [sɛ̃t seʁɔn lɛ mɔʁtaɲ]) is a commune in the Orne department in north-western France.

== Geography ==
The commune is made up of the following collection of villages and hamlets, Boisse, Poix, La Tuée, Beauroussel, Fresnay and Sainte-Céronne-lès-Mortagne.

The Commune along with another 70 communes shares part of a 47,681 hectare, Natura 2000 conservation area, called the Forêts et étangs du Perche.

== Notable buildings and places ==
=== National heritage sites ===
The Commune has two buildings and areas listed as a Monument historique.

Sainte-Céronne Church is a church built during the 12th century was classed as a Monument historique in 1975.

Feudal motte is a small castle on a motte that dates back to the 11th century, it was listed as a monument in 1975.

== See also ==
- Communes of the Orne department
