= Boëcé =

- Commune
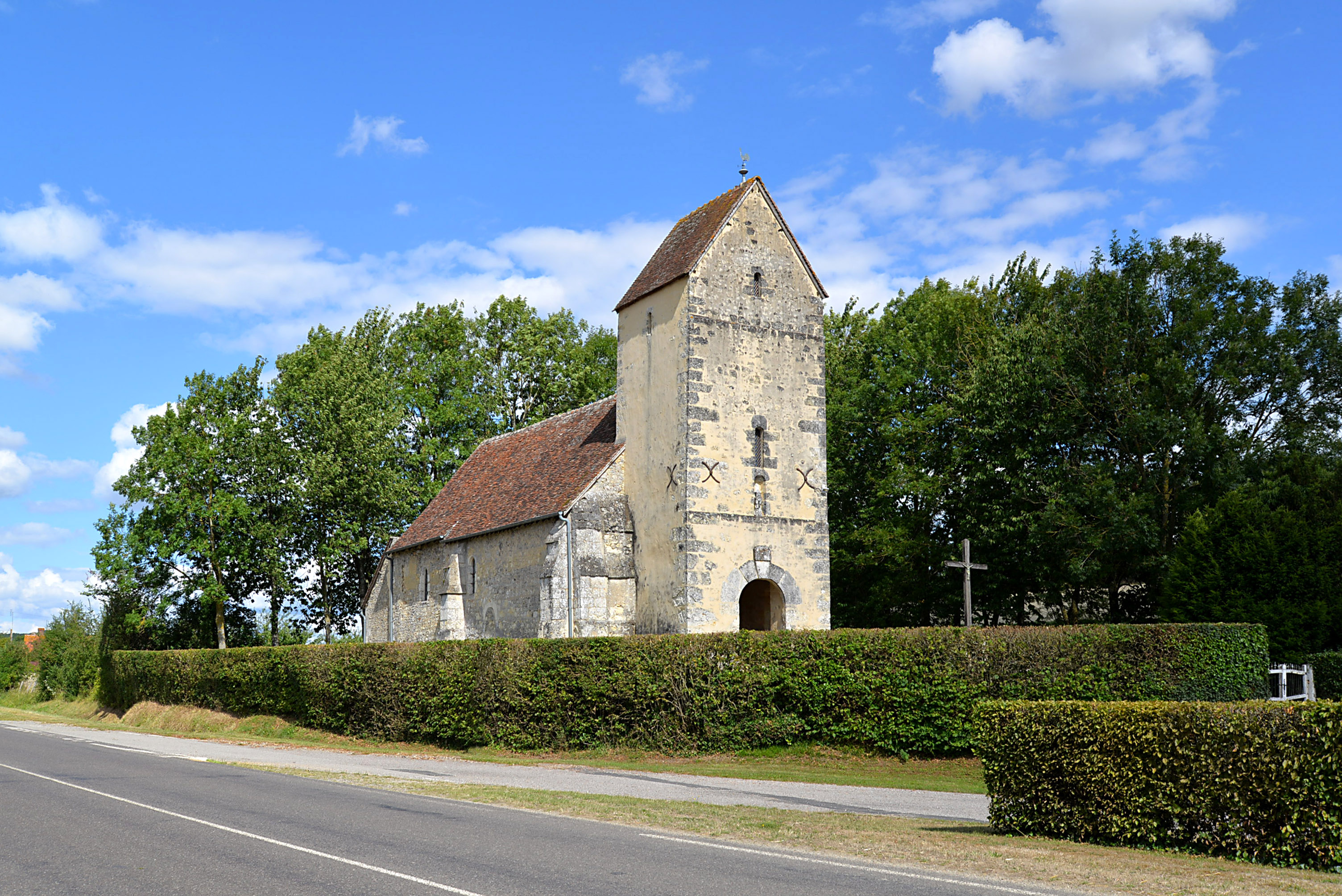
- The church in Boëcé
- Location of Boëcé
- Location within France Location within Normandy
- Coordinates: 48°31′01″N 0°27′31″E
- Country: France
- Region: Normandy
- Department: Orne
- Arrondissement: Mortagne-au-Perche
- Canton: Mortagne-au-Perche
- Intercommunality: Pays de Mortagne au Perche

Government
  - Mayor (2020–2026): Ludovic Vincent
- Area^{1}: 2.41 km^{2} (0.93 sq mi)
- Elevation: 188 m (617 ft)
- Highest elevation: 224 m (735 ft)
- Lowest elevation: 164 m (538 ft)
- Population (2023): 125
  - Density: 51.9/km^{2} (134/sq mi)
- Time zone: UTC+01:00 (CET)
  - Summer (DST): UTC+02:00 (CEST)
- INSEE/Postal code: 61048 /61560
- ^{1} French Land Register data, which excludes lakes, ponds, glaciers > 1 km^{2} (0.386 sq mi or 247 acres) and river estuaries.

Boëcé (French pronunciation: [bɔɛse]) is a commune in the Orne department in north-western France.

== Geography ==
The commune is made up of the following collection of villages and hamlets, Boëcé, Le Petit Boëcé and La Fosse.

== Population ==
Historical population
| Year | Pop. | ±% p.a. |
|---|---|---|
| 1968 | 77 | — |
| 1975 | 84 | +1.25% |
| 1982 | 79 | −0.87% |
| 1990 | 101 | +3.12% |
| 1999 | 104 | +0.33% |
| 2007 | 133 | +3.12% |
| 2012 | 117 | −2.53% |
| 2017 | 124 | +1.17% |
| 2023 | 125 | +0.13% |
Source: INSEE

== See also ==
- Communes of the Orne department
