= Le Pin-la-Garenne =

- Commune
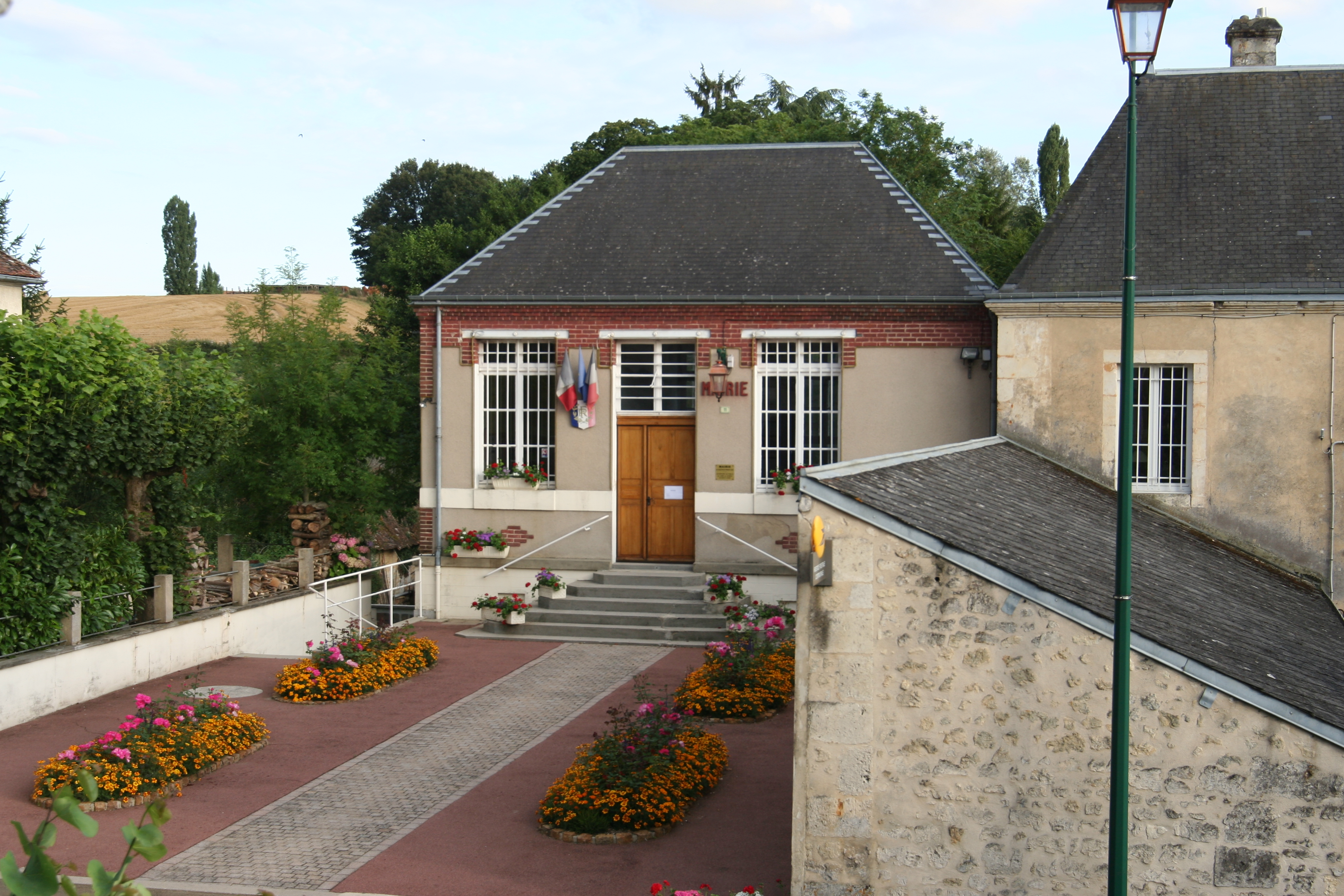
- The town hall in Le Pin-la-Garenne
- Location of Le Pin-la-Garenne
- Location within France Location within Normandy
- Coordinates: 48°26′34″N 0°32′51″E
- Country: France
- Region: Normandy
- Department: Orne
- Arrondissement: Mortagne-au-Perche
- Canton: Mortagne-au-Perche
- Intercommunality: Pays de Mortagne au Perche

Government
  - Mayor (2020–2026): Alain Maraquin
- Area^{1}: 15.88 km^{2} (6.13 sq mi)
- Elevation: 167 m (548 ft)
- Highest elevation: 190 m (620 ft)
- Lowest elevation: 142 m (466 ft)
- Population (2023): 618
  - Density: 38.9/km^{2} (101/sq mi)
- Time zone: UTC+01:00 (CET)
  - Summer (DST): UTC+02:00 (CEST)
- INSEE/Postal code: 61329 /61400
- Website: www.lepinlagarenne.com
- ^{1} French Land Register data, which excludes lakes, ponds, glaciers > 1 km^{2} (0.386 sq mi or 247 acres) and river estuaries.

Le Pin-la-Garenne (French pronunciation: [lə pɛ̃ la ɡaʁɛn]) is a commune North of Bellême in the Orne department in north-western France.

== Geography ==
The commune is made up of the following collection of villages and hamlets, L'Aître Forêt, La Courtinière, Le Pin-la-Garenne, Manoir de la Pellonière and La Martellière.

Le Chêne Galon is the only watercourse that traverses through the commune.

== Points of interest ==
=== National heritage sites ===
- Château de la Pellonière a thirteenth century chateau, during the Hundred Years' War the castle was occupied by Henry V of England. It was registered as a Monument historique 1967.

== Notable people ==
- Peter II, Count of Alençon (1340 – 1404), the count of Alençon and count of Perche is buried here.

== See also ==
- Communes of the Orne department
