= Saint-Jouin-de-Blavou =

- Commune
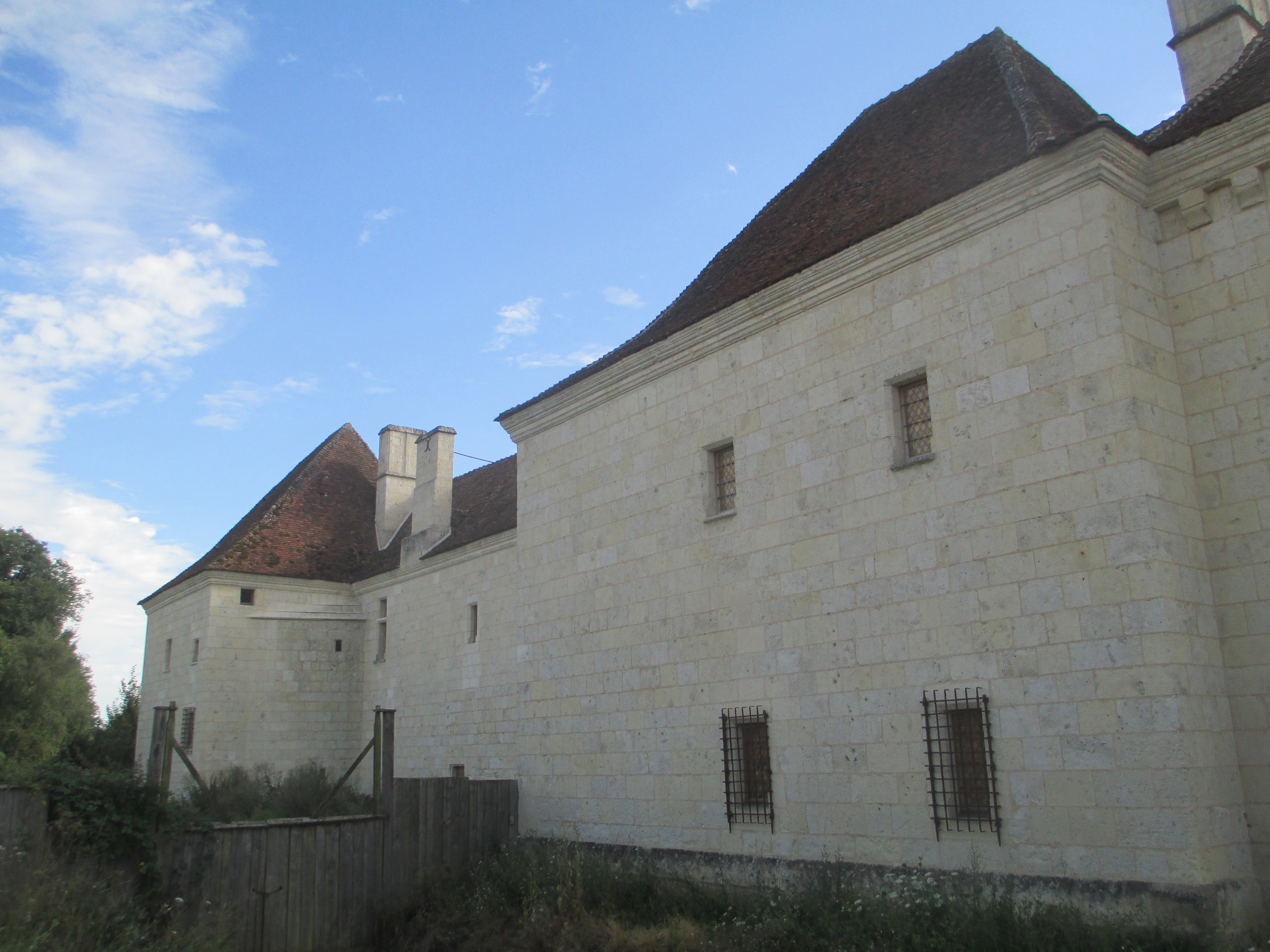
- Chanceaux manor in Saint-Jouin-de-Blavou
- Location of Saint-Jouin-de-Blavou
- Location within France Location within Normandy
- Coordinates: 48°27′10″N 0°28′27″E
- Country: France
- Region: Normandy
- Department: Orne
- Arrondissement: Mortagne-au-Perche
- Canton: Mortagne-au-Perche
- Intercommunality: Pays de Mortagne au Perche

Government
  - Mayor (2020–2026): Nicolas Laforet
- Area^{1}: 17.71 km^{2} (6.84 sq mi)
- Elevation: 187 m (614 ft)
- Highest elevation: 207 m (679 ft)
- Lowest elevation: 152 m (499 ft)
- Population (2023): 311
  - Density: 17.6/km^{2} (45.5/sq mi)
- Time zone: UTC+01:00 (CET)
  - Summer (DST): UTC+02:00 (CEST)
- INSEE/Postal code: 61411 /61360
- ^{1} French Land Register data, which excludes lakes, ponds, glaciers > 1 km^{2} (0.386 sq mi or 247 acres) and river estuaries.

Saint-Jouin-de-Blavou (French pronunciation: [sɛ̃ ʒwɛ̃ də blavu]) is a commune in the Orne department in the Normandy region of north-western France. Its inhabitants are known as Jovinians.

== Geography ==
The river Huisne flows through the commune.

== Demography ==
Historical population

Year	Pop.	±% p.a.
1793	692	—
1821	864	+0.80%
1846	900	+0.16%
1872	848	−0.23%
1901	599	−1.19%
1926	489	−0.81%
1946	461	−0.29%
1962	474	+0.17%
1968	398	−2.87%

Year	Pop.	±% p.a.
1975	322	−2.98%
1982	284	−1.78%
1990	302	+0.77%
1999	309	+0.25%
2007	285	−1.01%
2012	306	+1.43%
2017	282	−1.62%
2023	311	+1.64%

Source: EHESS and INSEE

== Places of interest ==
- Church of Saint-Jouin (sixteenth century)
- The manor house of Blavou (sixteenth century) and its bread oven, classified as a Monument historique
- The château de Chanceaux (sixteenth century) and its chapel of Saint-Marc (seventeenth century), also classified as historic monuments

== See also ==
- Communes of the Orne department
