= Saint-Germain-de-Martigny =

- Commune
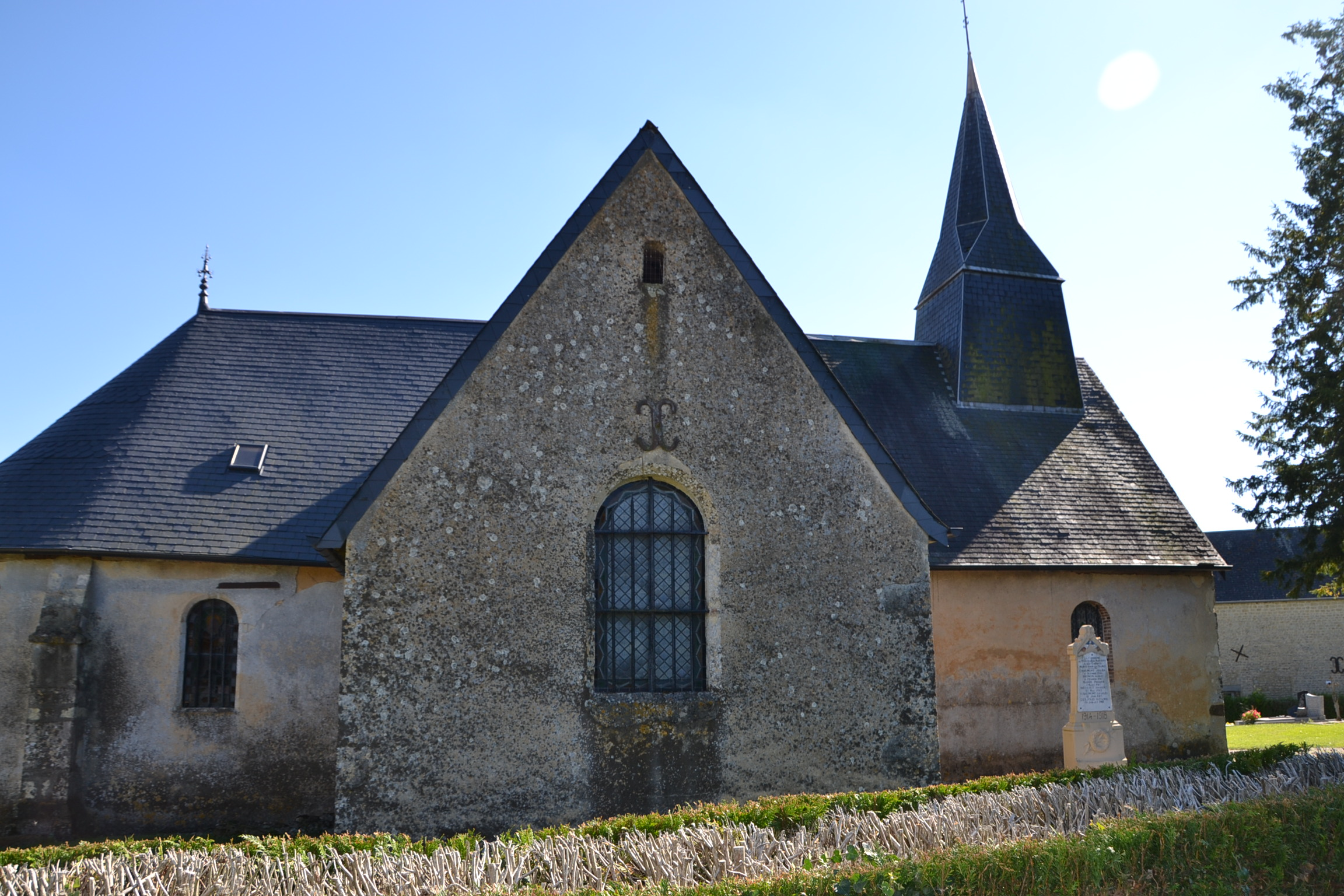
- Location of Saint-Germain-de-Martigny
- Location within France Location within Normandy
- Coordinates: 48°35′23″N 0°27′46″E
- Country: France
- Region: Normandy
- Department: Orne
- Arrondissement: Mortagne-au-Perche
- Canton: Mortagne-au-Perche
- Intercommunality: Pays de Mortagne au Perche

Government
  - Mayor (2020–2026): Denis Mousset
- Area^{1}: 3.89 km^{2} (1.50 sq mi)
- Elevation: 193 m (633 ft)
- Highest elevation: 246 m (807 ft)
- Lowest elevation: 175 m (574 ft)
- Population (2023): 78
  - Density: 20/km^{2} (52/sq mi)
- Demonym: Germinois
- Time zone: UTC+01:00 (CET)
  - Summer (DST): UTC+02:00 (CEST)
- INSEE/Postal code: 61396 /61560
- ^{1} French Land Register data, which excludes lakes, ponds, glaciers > 1 km^{2} (0.386 sq mi or 247 acres) and river estuaries.

Saint-Germain-de-Martigny (French pronunciation: [sɛ̃ ʒɛʁmɛ̃ də maʁtiɲi]) is a commune in the Orne department in north-western France.

== See also ==
- Communes of the Orne department
