= Montgaudry =

- Commune
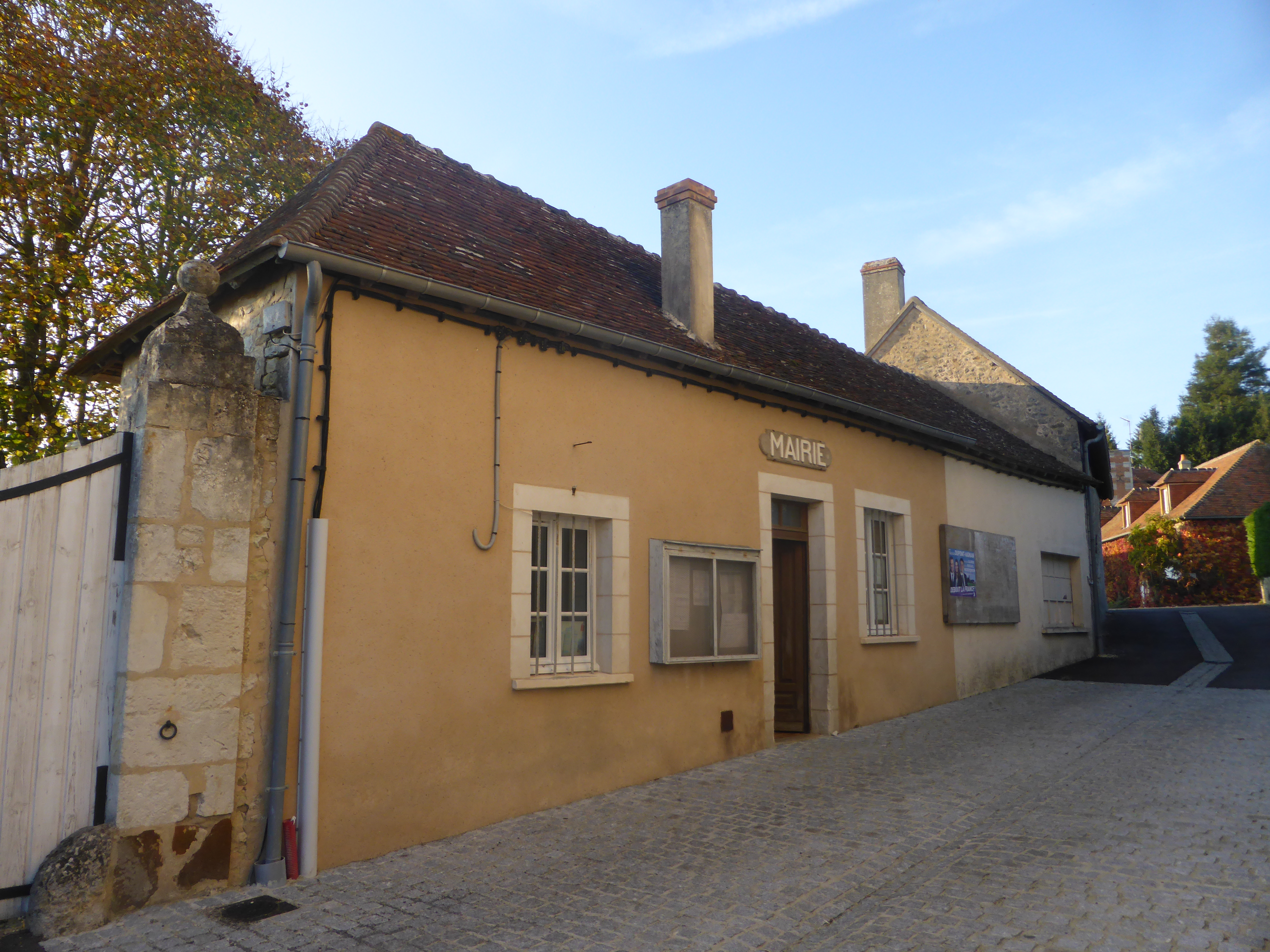
- The town hall in Montgaudry
- Location of Montgaudry
- Location within France Location within Normandy
- Coordinates: 48°24′25″N 0°24′10″E
- Country: France
- Region: Normandy
- Department: Orne
- Arrondissement: Mortagne-au-Perche
- Canton: Mortagne-au-Perche
- Intercommunality: Pays de Mortagne au Perche

Government
  - Mayor (2020–2026): Marie-Claude Chorin
- Area^{1}: 11.05 km^{2} (4.27 sq mi)
- Elevation: 100 m (330 ft)
- Highest elevation: 205 m (673 ft)
- Lowest elevation: 134 m (440 ft)
- Population (2023): 108
  - Density: 9.77/km^{2} (25.3/sq mi)
- Time zone: UTC+01:00 (CET)
  - Summer (DST): UTC+02:00 (CEST)
- INSEE/Postal code: 61286 /61360
- ^{1} French Land Register data, which excludes lakes, ponds, glaciers > 1 km^{2} (0.386 sq mi or 247 acres) and river estuaries.

Montgaudry (French pronunciation: [mɔ̃ɡodʁi]) is a commune in the Orne department in north-western France.

== Geography ==
The commune is made up of the following collection of villages and hamlets, Montgaudry, Biard and La Cochetterie.

The river the l'Orne Saosnoise flows through the commune. In addition another two watercourses La Pervenche and Le Belnoë passes through the commune.

== See also ==
- Communes of the Orne department
