= Fresnay-le-Samson =

- Commune
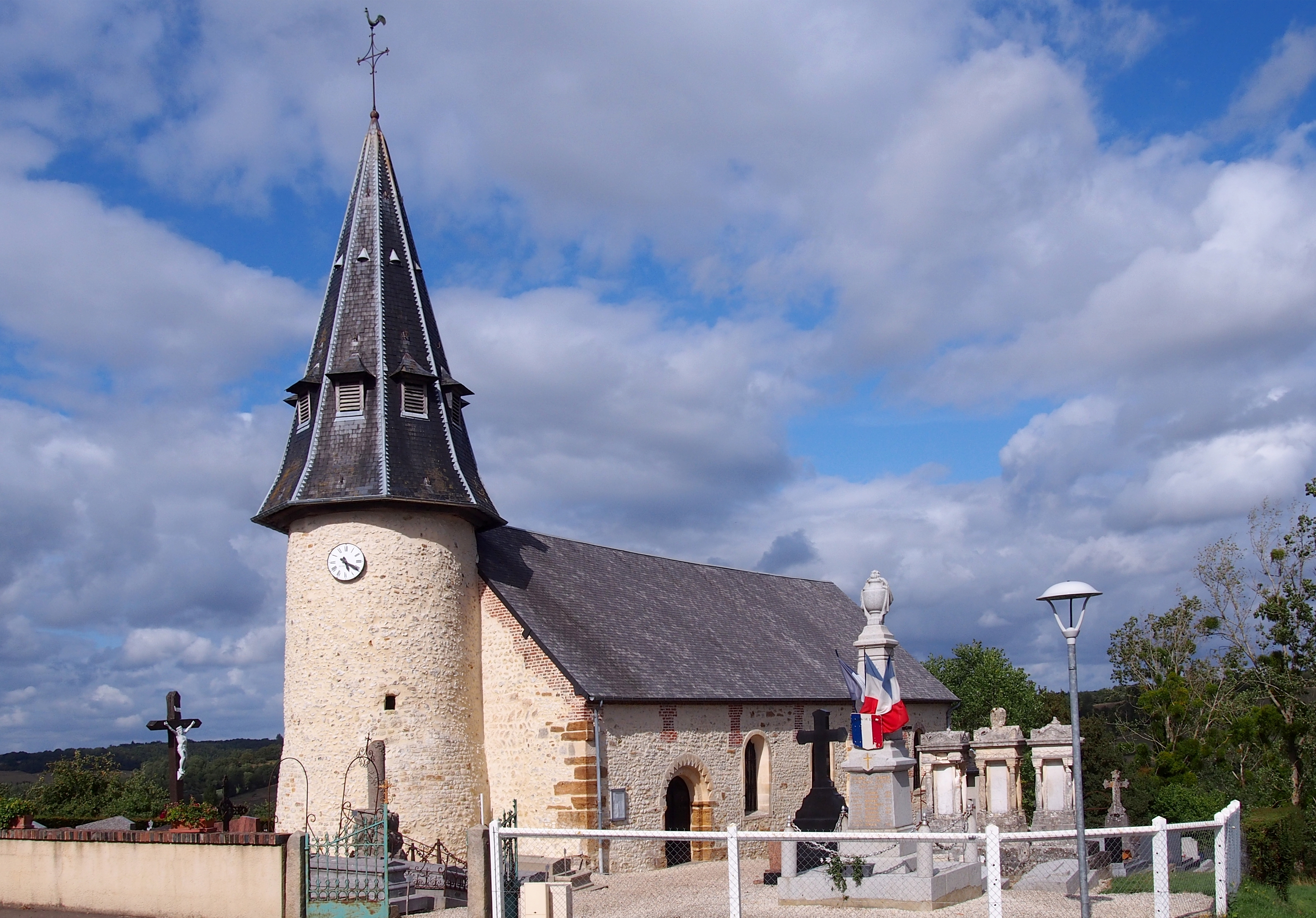
- Location of Fresnay-le-Samson
- Location within France Location within Normandy
- Coordinates: 48°53′02″N 0°12′37″E
- Country: France
- Region: Normandy
- Department: Orne
- Arrondissement: Mortagne-au-Perche
- Canton: Vimoutiers
- Intercommunality: Vallées d'Auge et du Merlerault

Government
  - Mayor (2020–2026): Thierry Laigre
- Area^{1}: 6.76 km^{2} (2.61 sq mi)
- Elevation: 165 m (541 ft)
- Highest elevation: 256 m (840 ft)
- Lowest elevation: 117 m (384 ft)
- Population (2023): 108
  - Density: 16.0/km^{2} (41.4/sq mi)
- Time zone: UTC+01:00 (CET)
  - Summer (DST): UTC+02:00 (CEST)
- INSEE/Postal code: 61180 /61120
- ^{1} French Land Register data, which excludes lakes, ponds, glaciers > 1 km^{2} (0.386 sq mi or 247 acres) and river estuaries.

Fresnay-le-Samson (French pronunciation: [fʁɛnɛ lə sɑ̃sɔ̃]) is a commune in the Orne department in north-western France.

== Geography ==
The commune has the river Vie and Fontaine de la Motte stream running through its borders.

== See also ==
- Communes of the Orne department
