= Saint-Nicolas-de-Sommaire =

- Commune
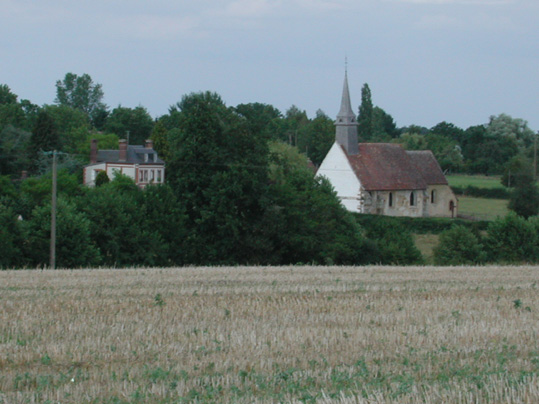
- The priory in Saint-Nicolas-de-Sommaire
- Location of Saint-Nicolas-de-Sommaire
- Location within France Location within Normandy
- Coordinates: 48°48′49″N 0°36′35″E
- Country: France
- Region: Normandy
- Department: Orne
- Arrondissement: Mortagne-au-Perche
- Canton: Rai
- Intercommunality: Pays de L'Aigle

Government
  - Mayor (2020–2026): Jacky de Taevernier
- Area^{1}: 16.28 km^{2} (6.29 sq mi)
- Elevation: 248 m (814 ft)
- Highest elevation: 286 m (938 ft)
- Lowest elevation: 227 m (745 ft)
- Population (2023): 261
  - Density: 16.0/km^{2} (41.5/sq mi)
- Time zone: UTC+01:00 (CET)
  - Summer (DST): UTC+02:00 (CEST)
- INSEE/Postal code: 61435 /61550
- ^{1} French Land Register data, which excludes lakes, ponds, glaciers > 1 km^{2} (0.386 sq mi or 247 acres) and river estuaries.

Saint-Nicolas-de-Sommaire (French pronunciation: [sɛ̃ nikɔla də sɔmɛʁ]) is a commune in the Orne department in north-western France.

== Points of interest ==
=== National heritage sites ===
- Saint-Pierre Chapel is a fifteenth century Chapel, that was registered as a Monument historique in 1906.

== See also ==
- Communes of the Orne department
