= Loisail =

- Commune
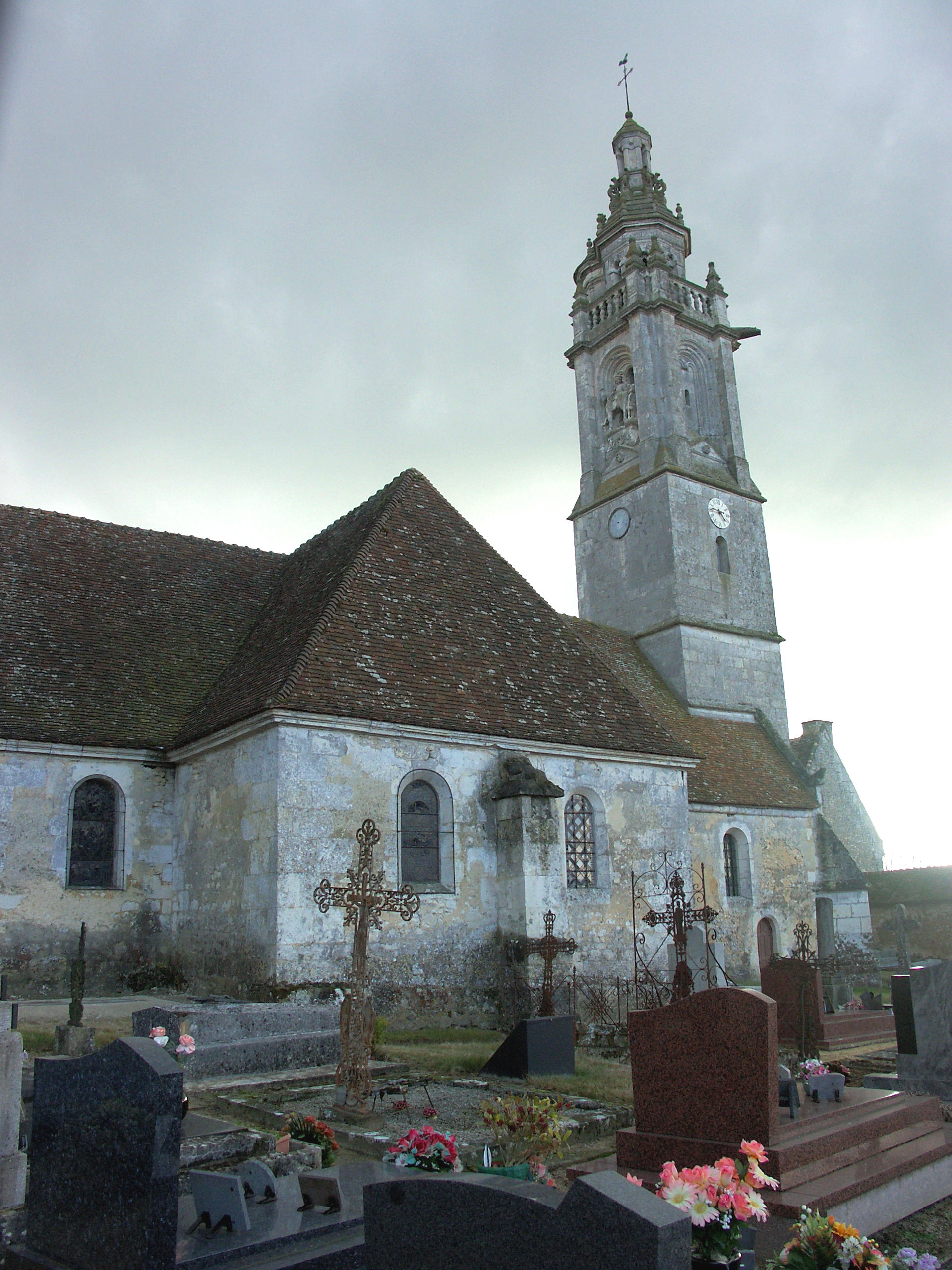
- The church in Loisail
- Location of Loisail
- Location within France Location within Normandy
- Coordinates: 48°30′07″N 0°35′29″E
- Country: France
- Region: Normandy
- Department: Orne
- Arrondissement: Mortagne-au-Perche
- Canton: Mortagne-au-Perche
- Intercommunality: Pays de Mortagne au Perche

Government
  - Mayor (2020–2026): Jacques Langevin
- Area^{1}: 5.16 km^{2} (1.99 sq mi)
- Elevation: 165 m (541 ft)
- Highest elevation: 211 m (692 ft)
- Lowest elevation: 158 m (518 ft)
- Population (2023): 135
  - Density: 26.2/km^{2} (67.8/sq mi)
- Time zone: UTC+01:00 (CET)
  - Summer (DST): UTC+02:00 (CEST)
- INSEE/Postal code: 61229 /61400
- ^{1} French Land Register data, which excludes lakes, ponds, glaciers > 1 km^{2} (0.386 sq mi or 247 acres) and river estuaries.

Loisail (French pronunciation: [lwazaj]) is a commune in the Orne department in north-western France.

== Geography ==
Loisail is made up of the following collection of villages and hamlets, Champaillaume, Les Ormeteaux, Loisail, La Cibotière, Le Chesnay and Les Boulays.

La Chippe is the sole watercourse that traverses through the commune.

== Points of Interest ==
- Carrière de Loisail is a Natura 2000 conservation site measuring 0.17 Hectares. The site is the leading bat hibernation site in Normandy in terms of numbers with 1,300 counted. The bats live in the former limestone quarries from the 19th century, which then became mushroom farms in 1955 up until 1980, when the area was abandoned. The site now hosts six varieties of bats, listed in Annex 2 of the Habitats Directive, which are the Greater horseshoe bat, Lesser horseshoe bat, Western barbastelle, Geoffroy's bat, Bechstein's bat and the Greater mouse-eared bat.

=== National heritage sites ===
The Commune has three buildings and areas listed as a Monument historique.

- Saint-Martin Church a sixteenth century church that was registered as a monument in 1905.
- Romanesque house a twelfth century house, registered as a Monument historique in 1974.
- Loisail Manor a sixteenth century Manor house, registered as a Monument historique in 1992.

== See also ==
- Communes of the Orne department
