= Bellavilliers =

- Commune
- Coat of arms
- Location of Bellavilliers
- Location within France Location within Normandy
- Coordinates: 48°25′27″N 0°29′55″E
- Country: France
- Region: Normandy
- Department: Orne
- Arrondissement: Mortagne-au-Perche
- Canton: Mortagne-au-Perche

Government
  - Mayor (2020–2026): Vincent Lavoissière
- Area^{1}: 15.73 km^{2} (6.07 sq mi)
- Elevation: 210 m (690 ft)
- Highest elevation: 222 m (728 ft)
- Lowest elevation: 159 m (522 ft)
- Population (2023): 142
  - Density: 9.03/km^{2} (23.4/sq mi)
- Time zone: UTC+01:00 (CET)
  - Summer (DST): UTC+02:00 (CEST)
- INSEE/Postal code: 61037 /61360
- ^{1} French Land Register data, which excludes lakes, ponds, glaciers > 1 km^{2} (0.386 sq mi or 247 acres) and river estuaries.

Bellavilliers (French pronunciation: [bɛlavilje]) is a commune in the Orne department in northwestern France.

== Geography ==
The commune is made up of the following collection of villages and hamlets, Bellavilliers, La Houdairie, Orgères and Les Ronchères.

Two water courses flow through the commune, Le Chêne Galon and one of its tributaries a stream, the Ruisseau de chêne galon flow through the commune.

The Commune along with another 70 communes shares part of a 47,681 hectare, Natura 2000 conservation area, called the Forêts et étangs du Perche.

== Population ==
Historical population
Year	Pop.	±% p.a.
1968	263	—
1975	216	−2.77%
1982	173	−3.12%
1990	170	−0.22%
1999	173	+0.19%
2007	164	−0.67%
2012	152	−1.51%
2017	139	−1.77%
2023	142	+0.36%
Source: INSEE

== See also ==
- Communes of the Orne department
