= Saint-Aubin-de-Courteraie =

- Commune
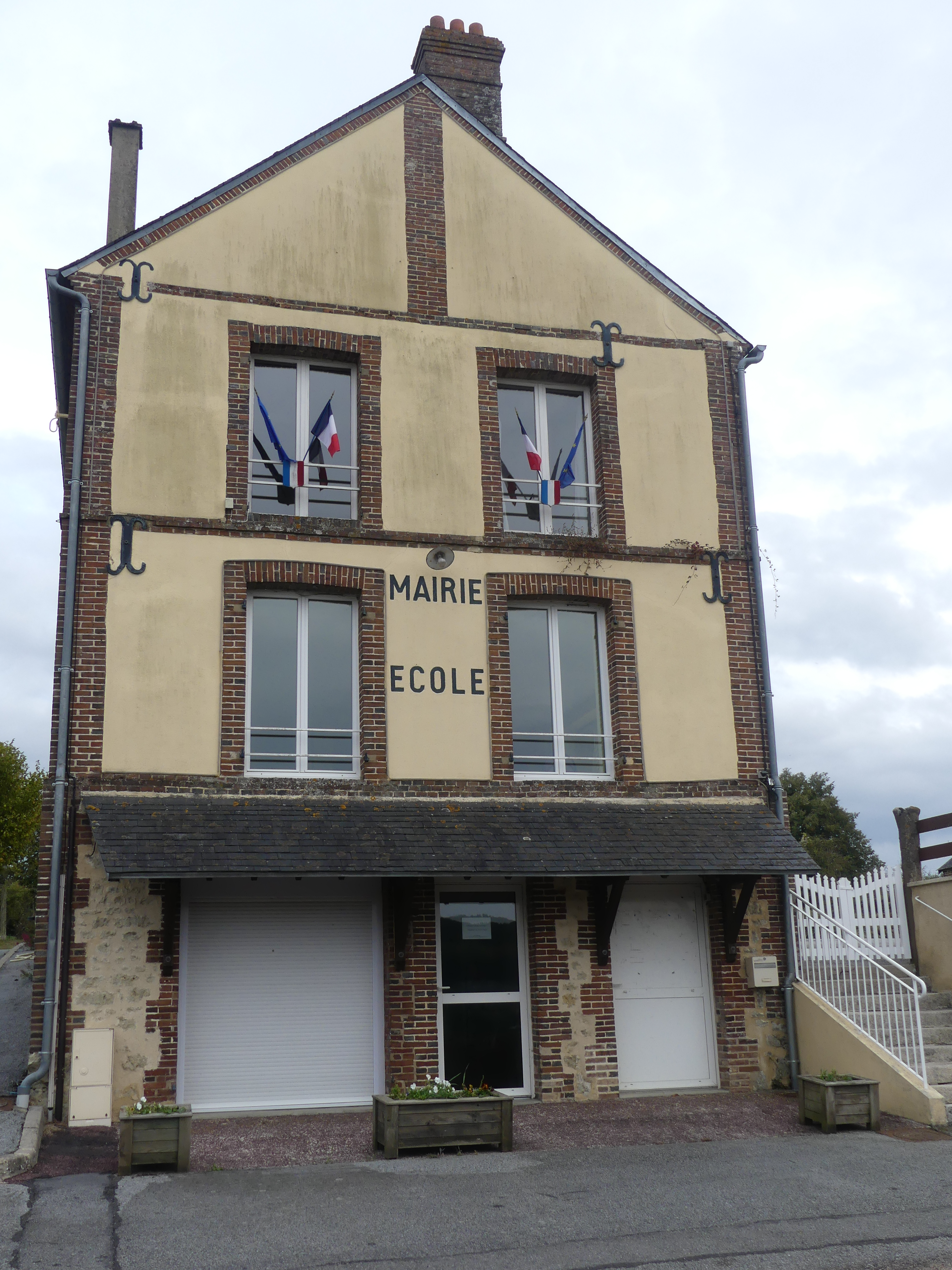
- The town hall in Saint-Aubin-de-Courteraie
- Location of Saint-Aubin-de-Courteraie
- Location within France Location within Normandy
- Coordinates: 48°36′38″N 0°26′25″E
- Country: France
- Region: Normandy
- Department: Orne
- Arrondissement: Mortagne-au-Perche
- Canton: Mortagne-au-Perche
- Intercommunality: Pays de Mortagne-au-Perche

Government
  - Mayor (2020–2026): Michel Lepoivre
- Area^{1}: 10.05 km^{2} (3.88 sq mi)
- Elevation: 210 m (690 ft)
- Highest elevation: 257 m (843 ft)
- Lowest elevation: 163 m (535 ft)
- Population (2023): 129
  - Density: 12.8/km^{2} (33.2/sq mi)
- Demonym: Saint-Aubinois
- Time zone: UTC+01:00 (CET)
  - Summer (DST): UTC+02:00 (CEST)
- INSEE/Postal code: 61367 /61560
- ^{1} French Land Register data, which excludes lakes, ponds, glaciers > 1 km^{2} (0.386 sq mi or 247 acres) and river estuaries.

Saint-Aubin-de-Courteraie (French pronunciation: [sɛ̃.t‿obɛ̃ də kuʁtəʁɛ]) is a commune in the Orne department in north-western France.

== Geography ==
The commune is made up of the following collection of villages and hamlets, La Boullerie, La Maugerie, La Briqueterie, Saint-Aubin-de-Courteraie, La Barbotte, Le Brûle, Le Châtel and La Fresnas.

The commune along with another 32 communes is part of a 3,503 hectare, Natura 2000 conservation area, called the Haute vallée de la Sarthe.

The Sarthe river flows through the commune.

== See also ==
- Communes of the Orne department
