= Bazoches-sur-Hoëne =

- Commune
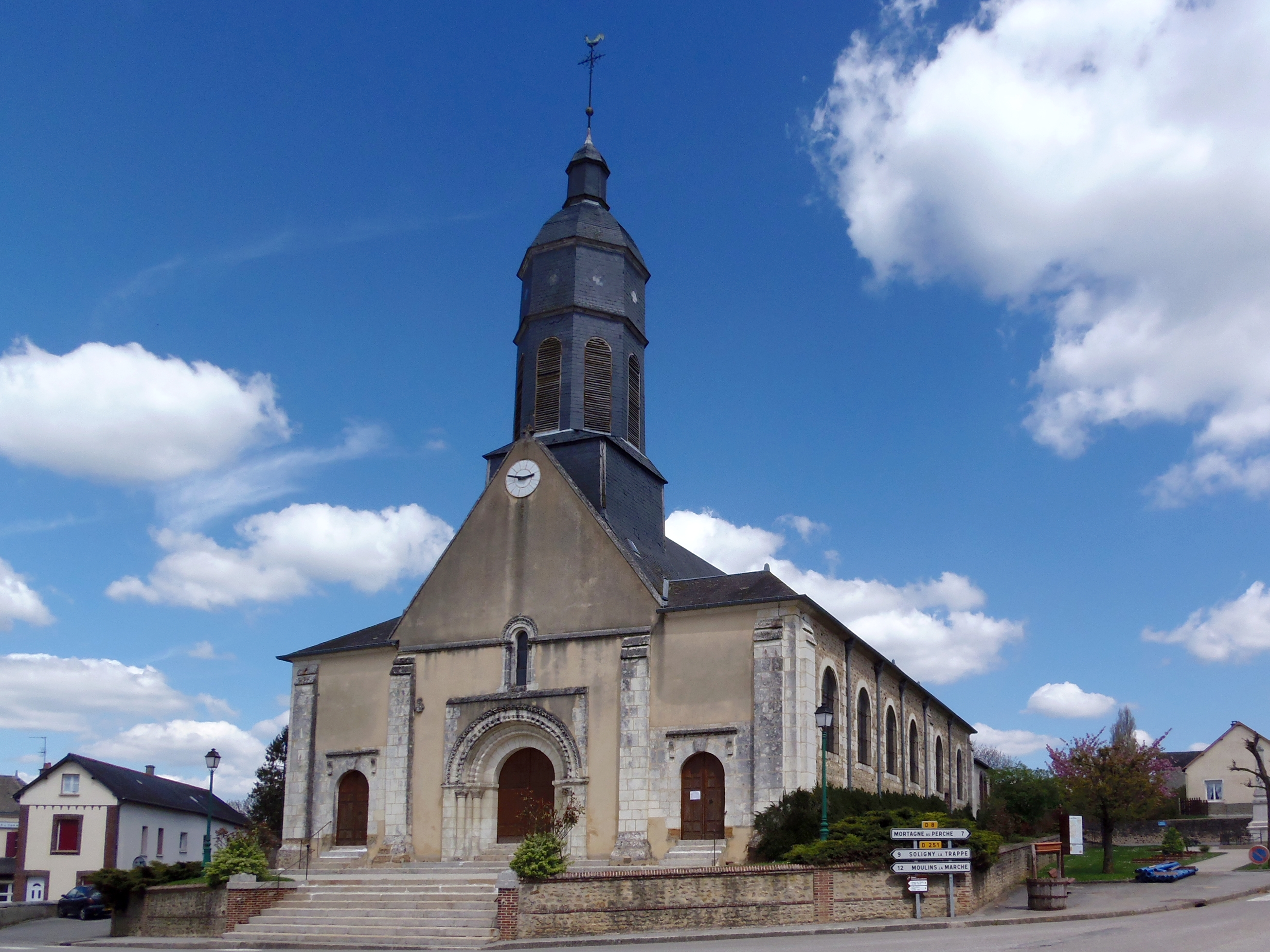
- The church in Bazoches-sur-Hoëne

- Coat of arms
- Location of Bazoches-sur-Hoëne
- Location within France Location within Normandy
- Coordinates: 48°33′09″N 0°28′19″E
- Country: France
- Region: Normandy
- Department: Orne
- Arrondissement: Mortagne-au-Perche
- Canton: Mortagne-au-Perche

Government
  - Mayor (2020–2026): Jean Lamy
- Area^{1}: 21.44 km^{2} (8.28 sq mi)
- Elevation: 200 m (660 ft)
- Highest elevation: 278 m (912 ft)
- Lowest elevation: 155 m (509 ft)
- Population (2023): 827
  - Density: 38.6/km^{2} (99.9/sq mi)
- Time zone: UTC+01:00 (CET)
  - Summer (DST): UTC+02:00 (CEST)
- INSEE/Postal code: 61029 /61560
- ^{1} French Land Register data, which excludes lakes, ponds, glaciers > 1 km^{2} (0.386 sq mi or 247 acres) and river estuaries.

Bazoches-sur-Hoëne (French pronunciation: [bazɔʃ syʁ ɔɛn]) is a commune in the Orne department in northwestern France.

== Geography ==
The commune is made up of the following collection of villages and hamlets, Bresnard, La Vergotière, Bazoches-sur-Hoëne, Courthioust, Les Hayes, La Saussaie and Courtoulin.

The commune along with another 32 communes is part of a 3,503 hectare, Natura 2000 conservation area, called the Haute vallée de la Sarthe.

The Sarthe river flows through the commune.

== Population ==
Historical population
Year	Pop.	±% p.a.
1968	624	—
1975	615	−0.21%
1982	797	+3.77%
1990	898	+1.50%
1999	918	+0.25%
2007	917	−0.01%
2012	938	+0.45%
2017	861	−1.70%
2023	827	−0.67%
Source: INSEE

== See also ==
- Communes of the Orne department
