= Coulimer =

- Commune
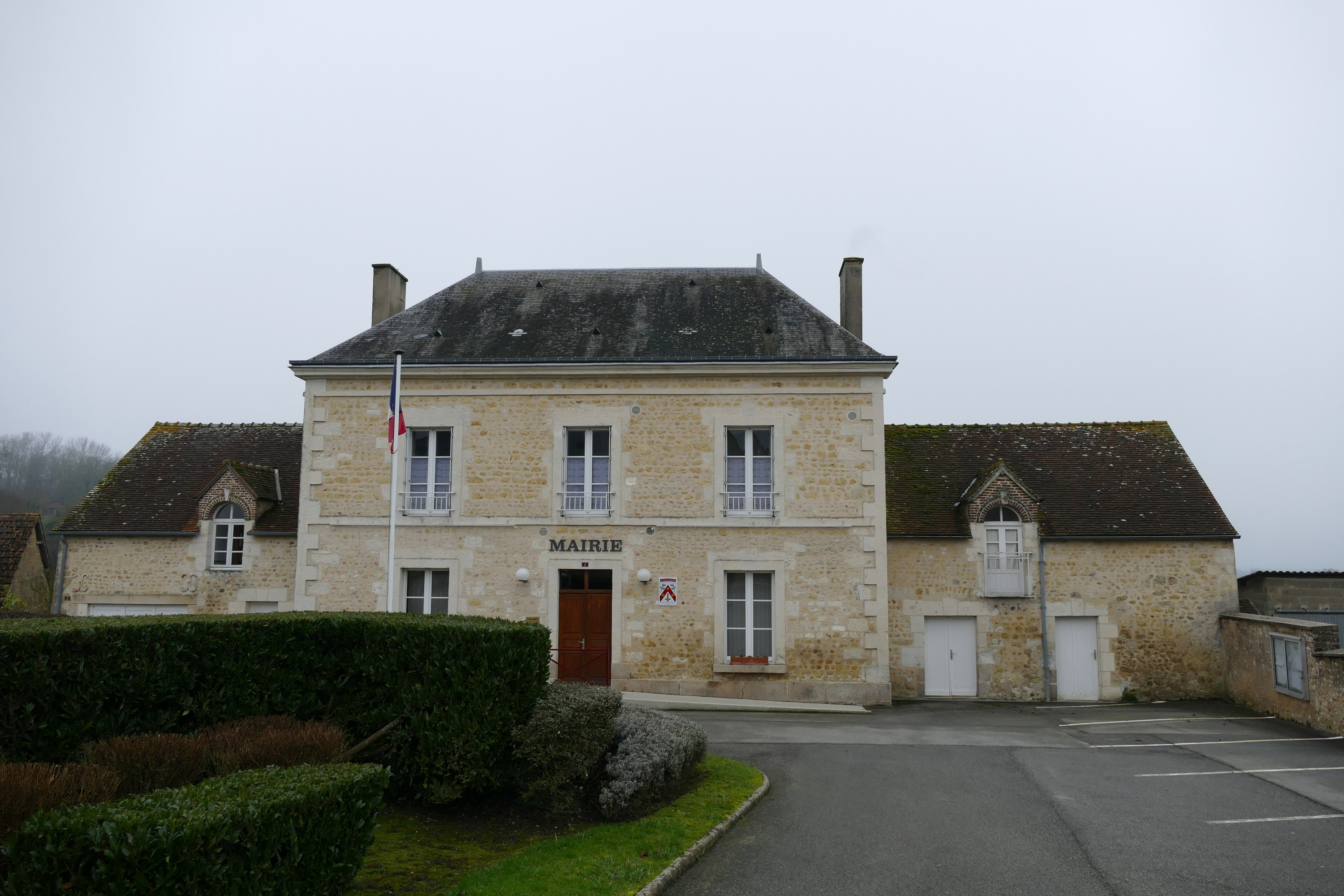
- The town hall in Coulimer
- Location of Coulimer
- Location within France Location within Normandy
- Coordinates: 48°28′34″N 0°28′04″E
- Country: France
- Region: Normandy
- Department: Orne
- Arrondissement: Mortagne-au-Perche
- Canton: Mortagne-au-Perche

Government
  - Mayor (2020–2026): Jean-Claude Marinthe
- Area^{1}: 17.19 km^{2} (6.64 sq mi)
- Elevation: 175 m (574 ft)
- Highest elevation: 225 m (738 ft)
- Lowest elevation: 153 m (502 ft)
- Population (2023): 285
  - Density: 16.6/km^{2} (42.9/sq mi)
- Time zone: UTC+01:00 (CET)
  - Summer (DST): UTC+02:00 (CEST)
- INSEE/Postal code: 61121 /61360
- ^{1} French Land Register data, which excludes lakes, ponds, glaciers > 1 km^{2} (0.386 sq mi or 247 acres) and river estuaries.

Coulimer is a commune in the Orne, a department in north-western France.

== Geography ==
The commune is made up of the following collection of villages and hamlets, Persas, Les Moulins, Les Bois and Coulimer.

The river l'Erine traverses through the commune.

== See also ==
- Communes of the Orne department
