= La Mesnière =

- Commune
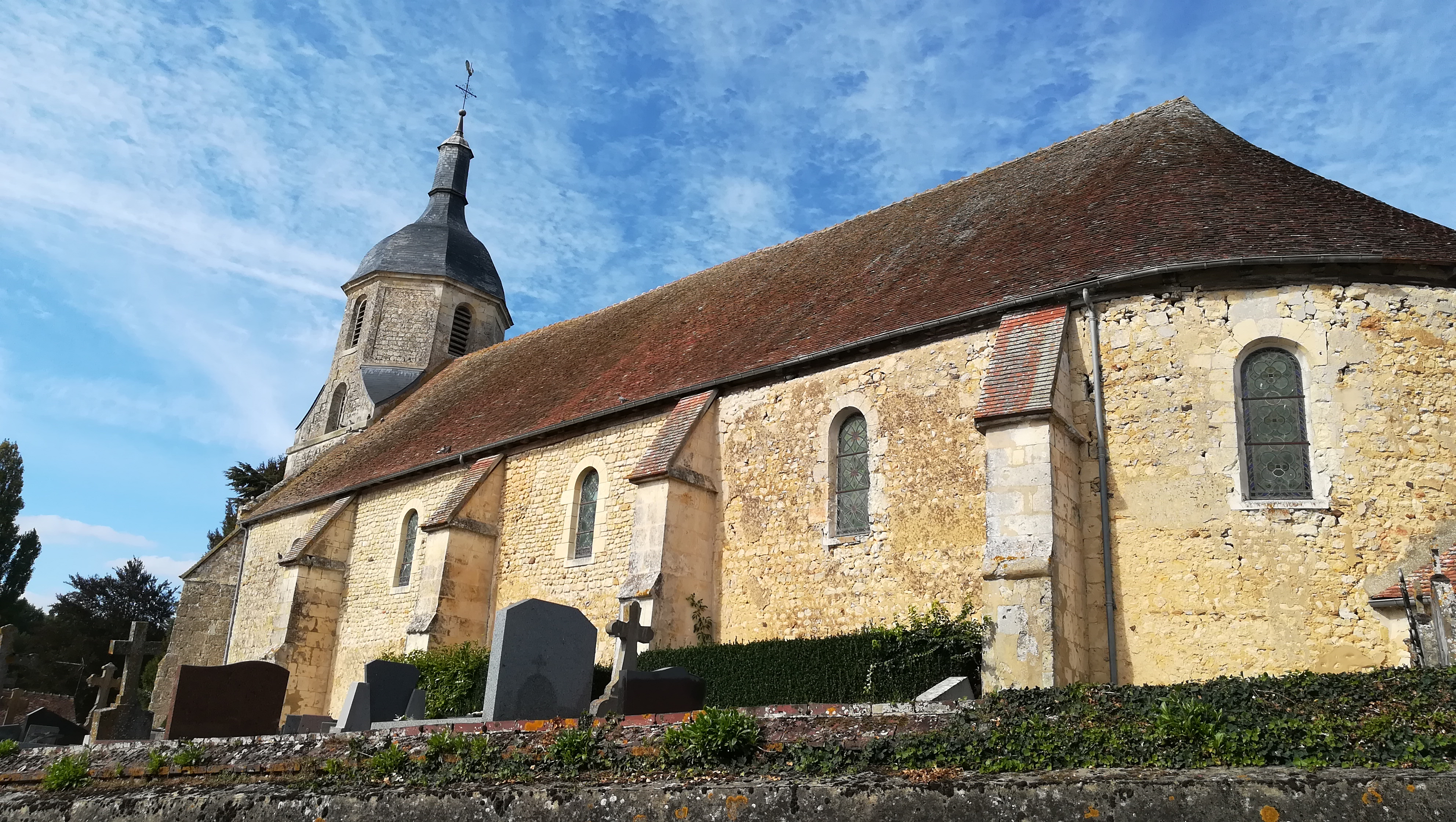
- The church in La Mesnière
- Location of La Mesnière
- Location within France Location within Normandy
- Coordinates: 48°31′29″N 0°26′02″E
- Country: France
- Region: Normandy
- Department: Orne
- Arrondissement: Mortagne-au-Perche
- Canton: Mortagne-au-Perche
- Intercommunality: Pays de Mortagne au Perche

Government
  - Mayor (2020–2026): Francis Bérard
- Area^{1}: 12.26 km^{2} (4.73 sq mi)
- Elevation: 160 m (520 ft)
- Highest elevation: 216 m (709 ft)
- Lowest elevation: 151 m (495 ft)
- Population (2023): 276
  - Density: 22.5/km^{2} (58.3/sq mi)
- Time zone: UTC+01:00 (CET)
  - Summer (DST): UTC+02:00 (CEST)
- INSEE/Postal code: 61277 /61560
- ^{1} French Land Register data, which excludes lakes, ponds, glaciers > 1 km^{2} (0.386 sq mi or 247 acres) and river estuaries.

La Mesnière (French pronunciation: [la mɛnjɛʁ]) is a commune in the Orne department in north-western France.

== Geography ==
The Commune is made up of the following collection of villages and hamlets, Gérusse, Teignouse, Virlouvet, La Mesnière and L'hôtel aux Agnés.

The Sarthe river and one of its tributaries l'Erine flow through the commune. There is also a stream that traverses the commune, Ruisseau de puisaye.

== Points of interest ==
=== National heritage sites ===
- Domaine des Joncherets eighteenth century estate, built at the end of the Ancien Régime, it was registered as a Monument historique 1995.

== See also ==
- Communes of the Orne department
