= Villiers-sous-Mortagne =

- Commune
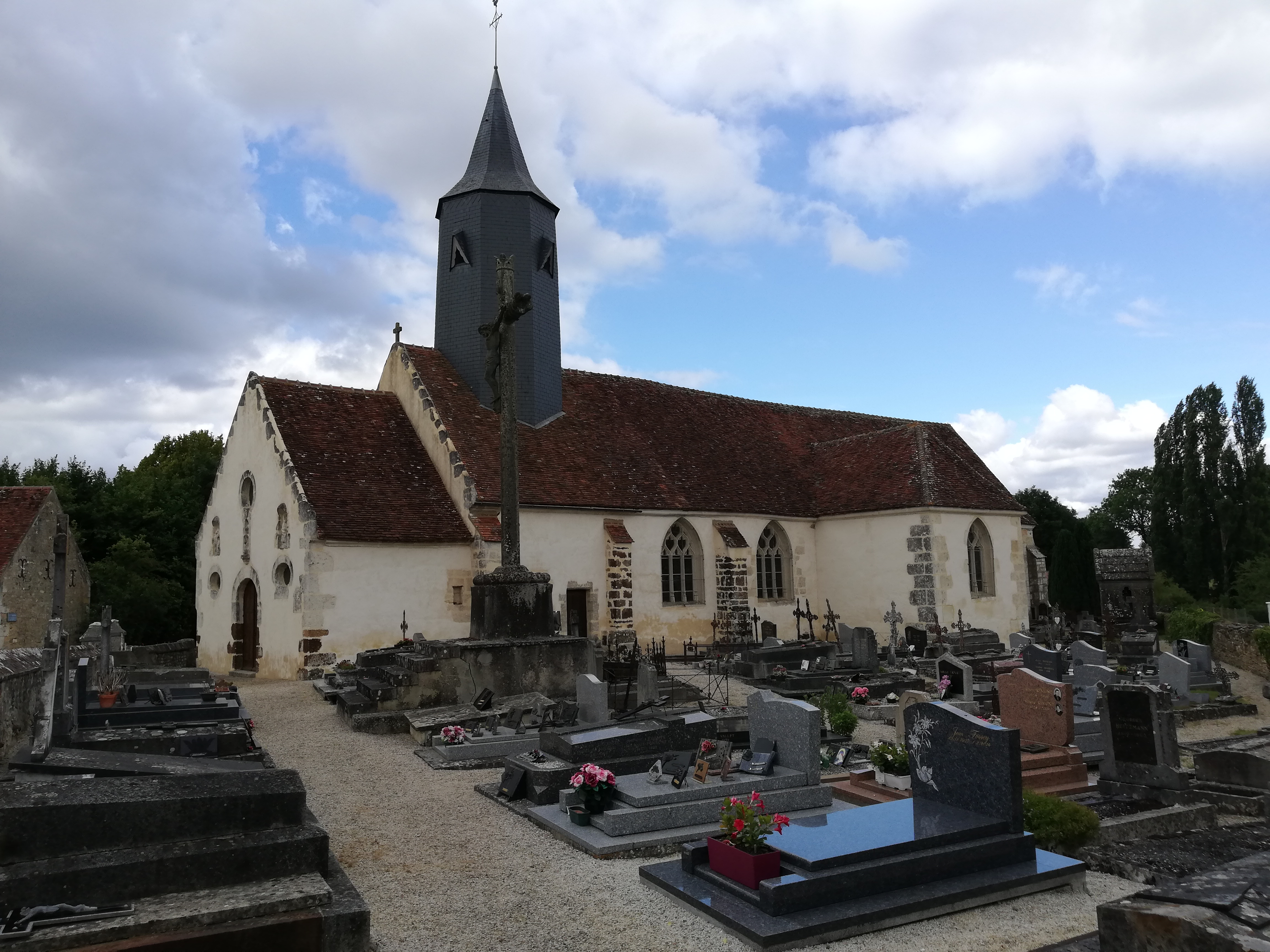
- Location of Villiers-sous-Mortagne
- Location within France Location within Normandy
- Coordinates: 48°32′21″N 0°35′38″E
- Country: France
- Region: Normandy
- Department: Orne
- Arrondissement: Mortagne-au-Perche
- Canton: Mortagne-au-Perche
- Intercommunality: Pays de Mortagne au Perche

Government
  - Mayor (2020–2026): Gilles Anne
- Area^{1}: 13.04 km^{2} (5.03 sq mi)
- Elevation: 278 m (912 ft)
- Highest elevation: 282 m (925 ft)
- Lowest elevation: 186 m (610 ft)
- Population (2023): 235
  - Density: 18.0/km^{2} (46.7/sq mi)
- Time zone: UTC+01:00 (CET)
  - Summer (DST): UTC+02:00 (CEST)
- INSEE/Postal code: 61507 /61400
- ^{1} French Land Register data, which excludes lakes, ponds, glaciers > 1 km^{2} (0.386 sq mi or 247 acres) and river estuaries.

Villiers-sous-Mortagne (French pronunciation: [vilje su mɔʁtaɲ], literally Villiers under Mortagne) is a commune in the Orne department in north-western France.

== See also ==
- Communes of the Orne department
