= Champeaux-sur-Sarthe =

- Commune
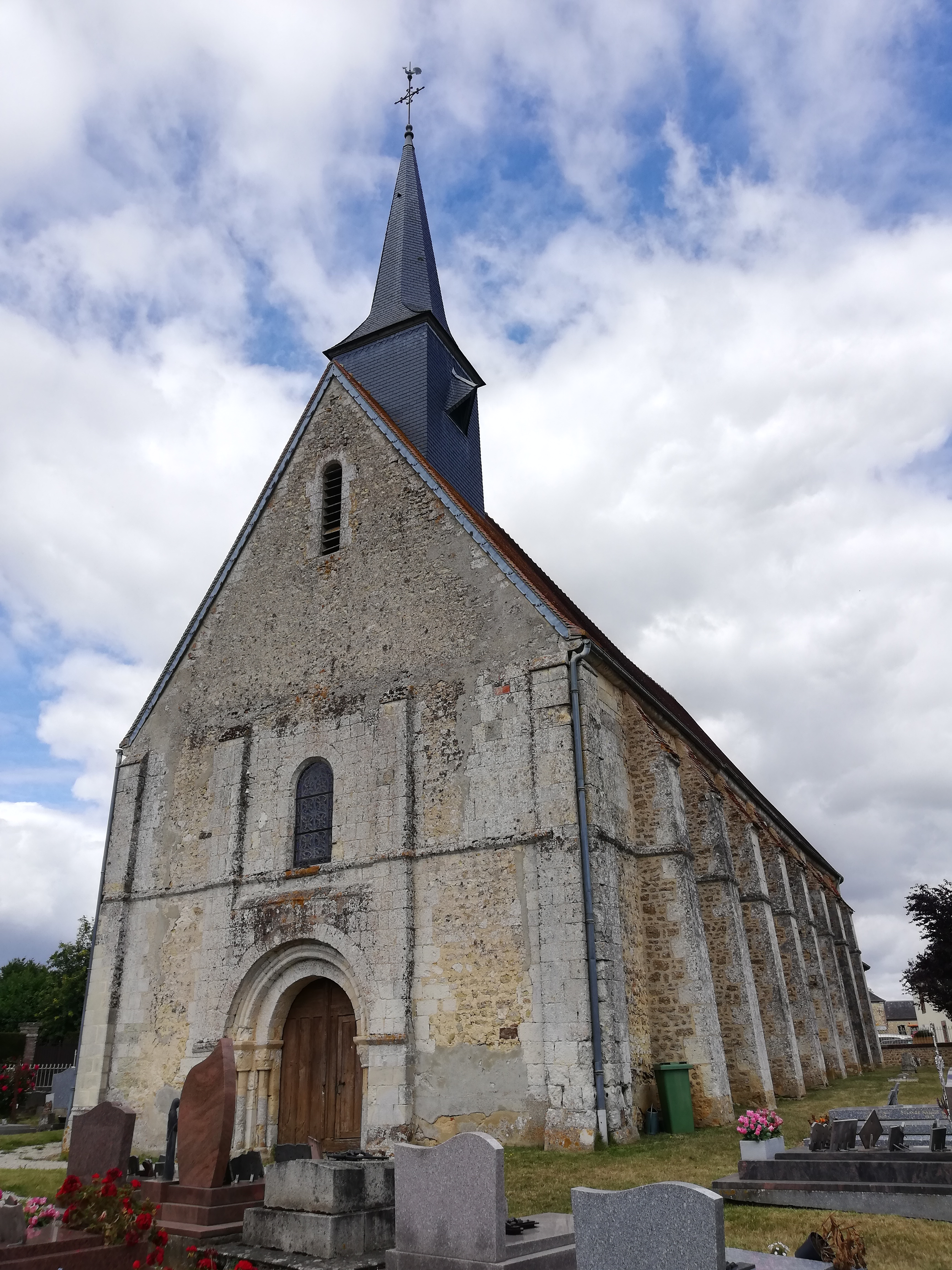
- Saint-Gilles church

- Coat of arms
- Location of Champeaux-sur-Sarthe
- Location within France Location within Normandy
- Coordinates: 48°34′39″N 0°26′36″E
- Country: France
- Region: Normandy
- Department: Orne
- Arrondissement: Mortagne-au-Perche
- Canton: Mortagne-au-Perche
- Intercommunality: Pays de Mortagne au Perche

Government
  - Mayor (2020–2026): Hervé Gautier
- Area^{1}: 9.49 km^{2} (3.66 sq mi)
- Elevation: 210 m (690 ft)
- Highest elevation: 232 m (761 ft)
- Lowest elevation: 156 m (512 ft)
- Population (2023): 159
  - Density: 16.8/km^{2} (43.4/sq mi)
- Time zone: UTC+01:00 (CET)
  - Summer (DST): UTC+02:00 (CEST)
- INSEE/Postal code: 61087 /61560
- ^{1} French Land Register data, which excludes lakes, ponds, glaciers > 1 km^{2} (0.386 sq mi or 247 acres) and river estuaries.

Champeaux-sur-Sarthe (French pronunciation: [ʃɑ̃po syʁ saʁt], literally Champeaux on Sarthe) is a commune in the Orne department in north-western France.

The town covers 9.5 km ² and has 185 people since the last population census from 2005. With a density of 19.5 inhabitants per km ², Champeaux-sur-Sarthe, grew by 4.5% of its population compared with 1999.

== Geography ==
The commune is made up of the following collection of villages and hamlets, Les Noës, La Normandière, La Brosse, Champeaux-sur-Sarthe and La Pichardière.

The commune along with another 32 communes is part of a 3,503 hectare, Natura 2000 conservation area, called the Haute vallée de la Sarthe.

The Sarthe river flows through the commune.

== See also ==
- Communes of the Orne department
