= Communes of the Orne department =

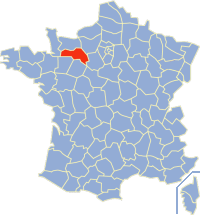

The following is a list of the 381 communes of the Orne department of France.

The communes cooperate in the following intercommunalities (as of 2025):

- Communauté urbaine d'Alençon (partly)
- Communauté d'agglomération Flers Agglo
- Communauté de communes Andaine-Passais
- CC Terres d'Argentan Interco
- Communauté de communes Cœur du Perche
- Communauté de communes des Collines du Perche Normand
- CC Domfront Tinchebray Interco
- Communauté de communes des Hauts du Perche
- Communauté de communes Maine Saosnois (partly)
- Communauté de communes des Pays de L'Aigle
- Communauté de communes du Pays fertois et du Bocage carrougien
- Communauté de communes du Pays de Mortagne au Perche
- Communauté de communes des Sources de l'Orne
- Communauté de communes du Val d'Orne
- Communauté de communes de la Vallée de la Haute Sarthe
- Communauté de communes des Vallées d'Auge et du Merlerault

INSEE code	Postal code	Commune
61214	61300	L'Aigle
61001	61000	Alençon
61002	61570	Almenêches
61005	61130	Appenai-sous-Bellême
61006	61200	Argentan
61422	61270	Les Aspres
61007	61430	Athis-Val de Rouvre
61008	61270	Aube
61010	61120	Aubry-le-Panthou
61011	61100	Aubusson
61012	61270	Auguaise
61013	61500	Aunay-les-Bois
61014	61200	Aunou-le-Faucon
61015	61500	Aunou-sur-Orne
61018	61470	Avernes-Saint-Gourgon
61020	61150	Avoine
61021	61700	Avrilly
61483	61140	Bagnoles de l'Orne Normandie
61023	61160	Bailleul
61024	61450	Banvou
61026	61170	Barville
61028	61210	Bazoches-au-Houlme
61029	61560	Bazoches-sur-Hoëne
61030	61100	La Bazoque
61032	61270	Beaufai
61034	61190	Beaulieu
61035	61600	Beauvain
61036	61500	Belfonds
61196	61130	Belforêt-en-Perche
61037	61360	Bellavilliers
61038	61130	Bellême
61039	61570	La Bellière
61040	61220	Bellou-en-Houlme
61041	61130	Bellou-le-Trichard
61043	61340	Berd'huis
61044	61430	Berjou
61046	61290	Bizou
61048	61560	Boëcé
61375	61570	Boischampré
61049	61570	Boissei-la-Lande
61051	61500	Boitron
61052	61270	Bonnefoi
61053	61380	Bonsmoulins
61054	61470	Le Bosc-Renoult
61055	61570	Boucé
61056	61500	Le Bouillon
61060	61270	Brethel
61061	61110	Bretoncelles
61062	61160	Brieux
61063	61220	Briouze
61064	61390	Brullemail
61066	61170	Buré
61067	61170	Bures
61068	61500	Bursard
61069	61430	Cahan
61070	61100	Caligny
61071	61120	Camembert
61072	61120	Canapville
61074	61320	Carrouges
61075	61330	Ceaucé
61076	61500	Le Cercueil
61077	61000	Cerisé
61078	61100	Cerisy-Belle-Étoile
61079	61260	Ceton
61080	61320	Chahains
61081	61500	Chailloué
61082	61390	Le Chalange
61084	61210	Champcerie
61085	61320	Le Champ-de-la-Pierre
61086	61120	Les Champeaux
61087	61560	Champeaux-sur-Sarthe
61088	61240	Champ-Haut
61089	61120	Champosoult
61091	61700	Champsecret
61092	61300	Chandai
61093	61800	Chanu
61094	61100	La Chapelle-au-Moine
61095	61100	La Chapelle-Biche
61097	61400	La Chapelle-Montligeon
61098	61500	La Chapelle-près-Sées
61099	61130	La Chapelle-Souëf
61100	61270	La Chapelle-Viel
61429	61190	Charencey
61101	61570	Le Château-d'Almenêches
61102	61450	Le Châtellier
61103	61230	Chaumont
61104	61600	La Chaux
61105	61360	Chemilli
61107	61320	Ciral
61108	61230	Cisai-Saint-Aubin
61111	61250	Colombiers
61113	61400	Comblot
61114	61200	Commeaux
61117	61250	Condé-sur-Sarthe
61118	61400	Corbon
61120	61160	Coudehard
61121	61360	Coulimer
61122	61230	Coulmer
61123	61160	Coulonces
61124	61220	La Coulonche
61126	61170	Coulonges-sur-Sarthe
61129	61400	Courgeon
61130	61560	Courgeoût
61050	61110	Cour-Maugis-sur-Huisne
61133	61390	Courtomer
61137	61220	Craménil
61138	61230	Croisilles
61139	61120	Crouttes
61140	61300	Crulai
61141	61250	Cuissai
61142	61130	Dame-Marie
61143	61250	Damigny
61145	61700	Domfront en Poiraie
61146	61700	Dompierre
61148	61100	Durcet
61149	61440	Échalou
61150	61370	Échauffour
61151	61270	Écorcei
61152	61160	Écorches
61153	61150	Écouché-les-Vallées
61341	61250	Écouves
61156	61500	Essay
61158	61600	Faverolles
61159	61390	Fay
61160	61400	Feings
61162	61380	La Ferrière-au-Doyen
61163	61450	La Ferrière-aux-Étangs
61164	61500	La Ferrière-Béchet
61165	61420	La Ferrière-Bochard
61166	61390	Ferrières-la-Verrerie
61167	61550	La Ferté-en-Ouche
61168	61600	La Ferté-Macé
61169	61100	Flers
61170	61200	Fleuré
61171	61160	Fontaine-les-Bassets
61176	61570	Francheville
61178	61230	La Fresnaie-Fayel
61180	61120	Fresnay-le-Samson
61181	61230	Gacé
61182	61420	Gandelain
61183	61390	Gâprée
61187	61270	Les Genettes
61189	61210	Giel-Courteilles
61190	61310	Ginai
61193	61550	La Gonfrière
61474	61310	Gouffern en Auge
61195	61600	Le Grais
61197	61160	Guêprei
61198	61120	Guerquesalles
61199	61210	Habloville
61202	61250	Hauterive
61203	61250	Héloup
61206	61290	L'Hôme-Chamondot
61207	61130	Igé
61208	61190	Irai
61209	61320	Joué-du-Bois
61210	61150	Joué-du-Plain
61212	61200	Juvigny-sur-Orne
61211	61140	Juvigny-Val-d'Andaine
61213	61320	Lalacelle
61215	61170	Laleu
61216	61320	La Lande-de-Goult
61217	61210	La Lande-de-Lougé
61218	61100	La Lande-Patry
61219	61100	La Lande-Saint-Siméon
61221	61100	Landigou
61222	61100	Landisacq
61224	61250	Larré
61225	61240	Lignères
61227	61220	Lignou
61229	61400	Loisail
61230	61290	Longny-les-Villages
61232	61700	Lonlay-l'Abbaye
61233	61600	Lonlay-le-Tesson
61234	61250	Lonrai
61237	61150	Lougé-sur-Maire
61238	61160	Louvières-en-Auge
61240	61500	Macé
61241	61110	La Madeleine-Bouvet
61242	61290	Le Mage
61243	61600	Magny-le-Désert
61244	61380	Mahéru
61248	61350	Mantilly
61251	61170	Marchemaisons
61252	61230	Mardilly
61255	61400	Mauves-sur-Huisne
61256	61570	Médavy

INSEE code	Postal code	Commune
61257	61410	Méhoudin
61258	61170	Le Mêle-sur-Sarthe
61259	61270	Le Ménil-Bérard
61261	61250	Le Ménil-Broût
61262	61800	Le Ménil-Ciboult
61260	61220	Le Ménil-de-Briouze
61263	61250	Ménil-Erreux
61264	61240	Ménil-Froger
61265	61210	Ménil-Gondouin
61266	61170	Le Ménil-Guyon
61267	61210	Ménil-Hermei
61268	61230	Ménil-Hubert-en-Exmes
61269	61430	Ménil-Hubert-sur-Orne
61271	61320	Le Ménil-Scelleur
61272	61240	Le Ménil-Vicomte
61273	61210	Ménil-Vin
61274	61290	Les Menus
61275	61240	Merlerault-le-Pin
61276	61160	Merri
61277	61560	La Mesnière
61278	61440	Messei
61279	61250	Mieuxcé
61281	61800	Moncy
61283	61160	Montabard
61284	61170	Montchevrel
61286	61360	Montgaudry
61287	61100	Montilly-sur-Noireau
61288	61570	Montmerrei
61289	61160	Mont-Ormel
61290	61210	Montreuil-au-Houlme
61291	61160	Montreuil-la-Cambe
61463	61600	Les Monts d'Andaine
61292	61800	Montsecret-Clairefougère
61285	61150	Monts-sur-Orne
61293	61400	Mortagne-au-Perche
61294	61570	Mortrée
61295	61600	La Motte-Fouquet
61297	61380	Moulins-la-Marche
61298	61200	Moulins-sur-Orne
61300	61110	Moutiers-au-Perche
61301	61500	Neauphe-sous-Essai
61302	61160	Neauphe-sur-Dive
61303	61160	Nécy
61304	61250	Neuilly-le-Bisson
61307	61120	Neuville-sur-Touques
61308	61210	Neuvy-au-Houlme
61314	61200	Occagnes
61316	61160	Ommoy
61228	61420	L'Orée-d'Écouves
61317	61230	Orgères
61319	61130	Origny-le-Roux
61321	61250	Pacé
61322	61400	Parfondeval
61323	61290	Le Pas-Saint-l'Homer
61324	61350	Passais-Villages
61309	61340	Perche en Nocé
61326	61700	Perrou
61327	61360	Pervenchères
61328	61310	Le Pin-au-Haras
61329	61400	Le Pin-la-Garenne
61330	61370	Planches
61331	61170	Le Plantis
61332	61220	Pointel
61333	61120	Pontchardon
61336	61130	Pouvrai
61339	61210	Putanges-le-Lac
61342	61270	Rai
61344	61150	Rânes
61345	61110	Rémalard-en-Perche
61346	61120	Le Renouard
61347	61230	Résenlieu
61348	61400	Réveillon
61349	61210	Ri
61096	61140	Rives-d'Andaine
61350	61420	La Roche-Mabile
61351	61120	Roiville
61352	61160	Rônai
61357	61320	Rouperroux
61116	61110	Sablons-sur-Huisne
61358	61200	Sai
61360	61170	Saint-Agnan-sur-Sarthe
61361	61220	Saint-André-de-Briouze
61362	61440	Saint-André-de-Messei
61363	61380	Saint-Aquilin-de-Corbion
61365	61170	Saint-Aubin-d'Appenai
61366	61470	Saint-Aubin-de-Bonneval
61367	61560	Saint-Aubin-de-Courteraie
61369	61700	Saint-Bômer-les-Forges
61370	61700	Saint-Brice
61371	61150	Saint-Brice-sous-Rânes
61372	61250	Saint-Céneri-le-Gérei
61374	61800	Saint-Christophe-de-Chaulieu
61376	61490	Saint-Clair-de-Halouze
61379	61130	Saint-Cyr-la-Rosière
61381	61400	Saint-Denis-sur-Huisne
61382	61420	Saint-Denis-sur-Sarthon
61373	61380	Sainte-Céronne-lès-Mortagne
61389	61370	Sainte-Gauburge-Sainte-Colombe
61407	61430	Sainte-Honorine-la-Chardonne
61408	61210	Sainte-Honorine-la-Guillaume
61384	61320	Saint-Ellier-les-Bois
61419	61320	Sainte-Marguerite-de-Carrouges
61420	61320	Sainte-Marie-la-Robert
61436	61100	Sainte-Opportune
61454	61170	Sainte-Scolasse-sur-Sarthe
61385	61230	Saint-Evroult-de-Montfort
61386	61550	Saint-Evroult-Notre-Dame-du-Bois
61387	61350	Saint-Fraimbault
61388	61130	Saint-Fulgent-des-Ormes
61390	61600	Saint-Georges-d'Annebecq
61391	61100	Saint-Georges-des-Groseillers
61392	61470	Saint-Germain-d'Aunay
61393	61240	Saint-Germain-de-Clairefeuille
61394	61130	Saint-Germain-de-la-Coudre
61396	61560	Saint-Germain-de-Martigny
61395	61110	Saint-Germain-des-Grois
61397	61000	Saint-Germain-du-Corbéis
61398	61390	Saint-Germain-le-Vieux
61399	61160	Saint-Gervais-des-Sablons
61400	61500	Saint-Gervais-du-Perron
61401	61700	Saint-Gilles-des-Marais
61402	61220	Saint-Hilaire-de-Briouze
61404	61400	Saint-Hilaire-le-Châtel
61405	61340	Saint-Hilaire-sur-Erre
61406	61270	Saint-Hilaire-sur-Risle
61411	61360	Saint-Jouin-de-Blavou
61412	61170	Saint-Julien-sur-Sarthe
61413	61160	Saint-Lambert-sur-Dive
61414	61400	Saint-Langis-lès-Mortagne
61415	61170	Saint-Léger-sur-Sarthe
61416	61390	Saint-Léonard-des-Parcs
61418	61400	Saint-Mard-de-Réno
61421	61350	Saint-Mars-d'Égrenne
61423	61300	Saint-Martin-d'Écublei
61424	61320	Saint-Martin-des-Landes
61425	61380	Saint-Martin-des-Pézerits
61426	61130	Saint-Martin-du-Vieux-Bellême
61427	61320	Saint-Martin-l'Aiguillon
61432	61300	Saint-Michel-Tubœuf
61433	61250	Saint-Nicolas-des-Bois
61435	61550	Saint-Nicolas-de-Sommaire
61438	61560	Saint-Ouen-de-Sécherouvre
61439	61410	Saint-Ouen-le-Brisoult
61440	61300	Saint-Ouen-sur-Iton
61442	61600	Saint-Patrice-du-Désert
61443	61100	Saint-Paul
61444	61430	Saint-Philbert-sur-Orne
61445	61800	Saint-Pierre-d'Entremont
61446	61370	Saint-Pierre-des-Loges
61447	61790	Saint-Pierre-du-Regard
61448	61340	Saint-Pierre-la-Bruyère
61450	61360	Saint-Quentin-de-Blavou
61451	61800	Saint-Quentin-les-Chardonnets
61452	61350	Saint-Roch-sur-Égrenne
61453	61320	Saint-Sauveur-de-Carrouges
61456	61300	Saint-Sulpice-sur-Risle
61457	61300	Saint-Symphorien-des-Bruyères
61459	61220	Saires-la-Verrerie
61461	61230	Le Sap-André
61460	61470	Sap-en-Auge
61462	61200	Sarceaux
61464	61500	Sées
61466	61100	La Selle-la-Forge
61467	61250	Semallé
61472	61200	Sévigny
61473	61150	Sevrai
61475	61380	Soligny-la-Trappe
61476	61360	Suré
61479	61150	Tanques
61480	61500	Tanville
61481	61390	Tellières-le-Plessis
61482	61410	Tessé-Froulay
61485	61120	Ticheville
61486	61800	Tinchebray-Bocage
61487	61330	Torchamp
61488	61550	Touquettes
61490	61160	Tournai-sur-Dive
61491	61190	Tourouvre au Perche
61492	61390	Trémont
61493	61230	La Trinité-des-Laitiers
61494	61160	Trun
61484	61260	Val-au-Perche
61497	61250	Valframbert
61498	61130	Vaunoise
61499	61170	Les Ventes-de-Bourse
61500	61190	La Ventrouze
61501	61110	Verrières
61502	61360	Vidai
61503	61150	Vieux-Pont
61505	61160	Villedieu-lès-Bailleul
61507	61400	Villiers-sous-Mortagne
61508	61120	Vimoutiers
61510	61300	Vitrai-sous-Laigle
61512	61210	Les Yveteaux
