= Pervenchères =

- Commune
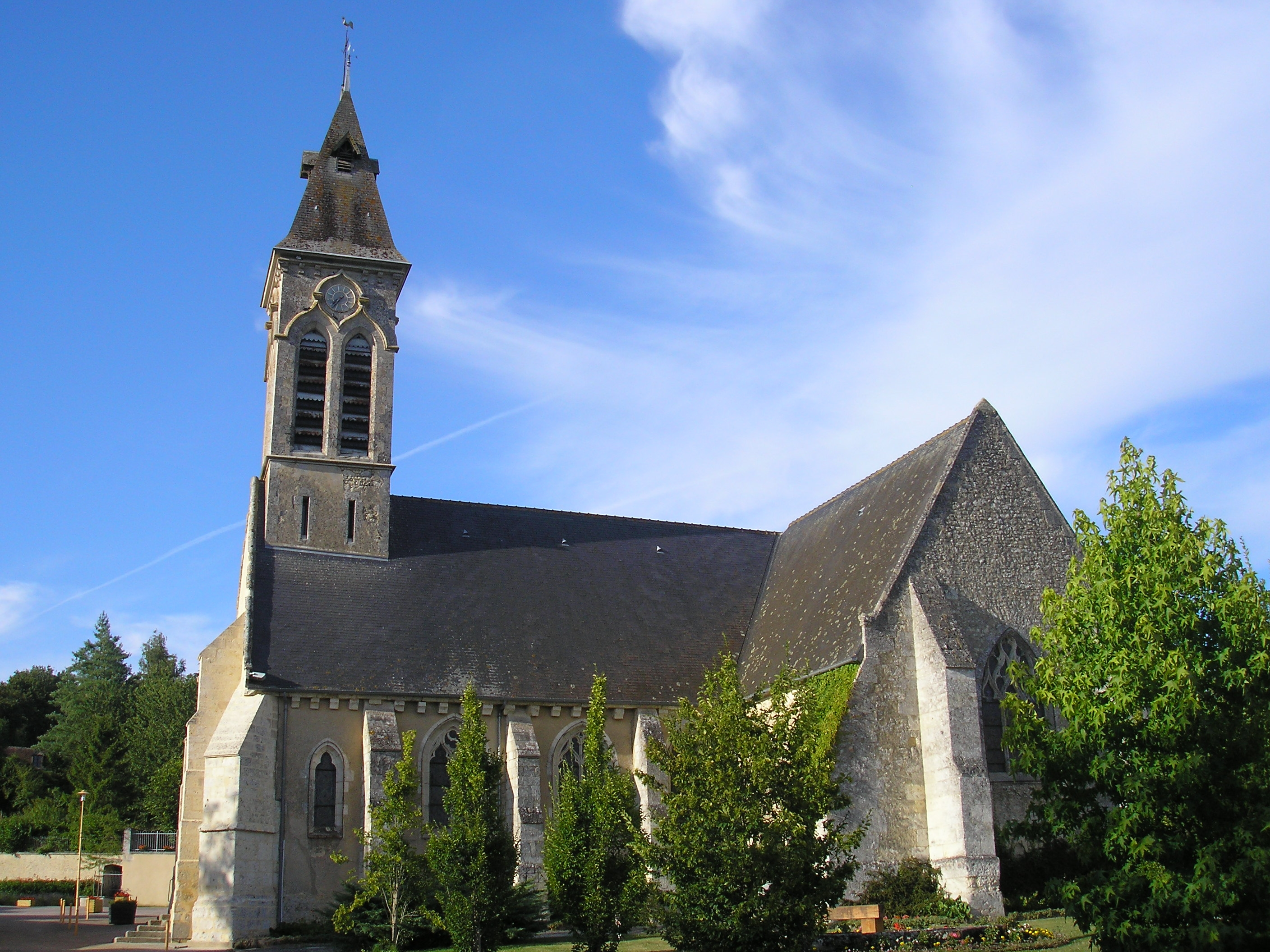
- The church in Pervenchères
- Location of Pervenchères
- Location within France Location within Normandy
- Coordinates: 48°26′20″N 0°25′35″E
- Country: France
- Region: Normandy
- Department: Orne
- Arrondissement: Mortagne-au-Perche
- Canton: Mortagne-au-Perche
- Intercommunality: Pays de Mortagne au Perche

Government
  - Mayor (2020–2026): Marc Querolle
- Area^{1}: 28.35 km^{2} (10.95 sq mi)
- Elevation: 165 m (541 ft)
- Highest elevation: 227 m (745 ft)
- Lowest elevation: 143 m (469 ft)
- Population (2023): 344
  - Density: 12.1/km^{2} (31.4/sq mi)
- Time zone: UTC+01:00 (CET)
  - Summer (DST): UTC+02:00 (CEST)
- INSEE/Postal code: 61327 /61360
- ^{1} French Land Register data, which excludes lakes, ponds, glaciers > 1 km^{2} (0.386 sq mi or 247 acres) and river estuaries.

Pervenchères (French pronunciation: [pɛʁvɑ̃ʃɛʁ]) is a commune in the Orne department in north-western France.

== Geography ==
The commune is made up of the following collection of villages and hamlets, La Maurie, Pervenchères, Monthodevin and La Mare Deffaux.

The river Huisne flows through the commune. In addition another three watercourses Le Belnoë, La Pervenche and the ruisseau de belno pass through the commune.

== Points of interest ==
- Chêne de la Lambonnière is a 8000m2 site of a 500 year old Pedunculate Oak, which includes pond, nature walk and a building built using traditional methods.

=== National heritage sites ===
- Vauvineux Manor is a fifteenth century Manor house, registered as a Monument historique in 1974.

== Heraldry ==
Arms of Pervenchères	The arms of Pervenchères are blazoned : Argent, 6 periwinkle flowers azure. Canting arms (Pervenchères are Periwinkles).

== See also ==
- Communes of the Orne department
