= Saint-Aquilin-de-Corbion =

- Commune
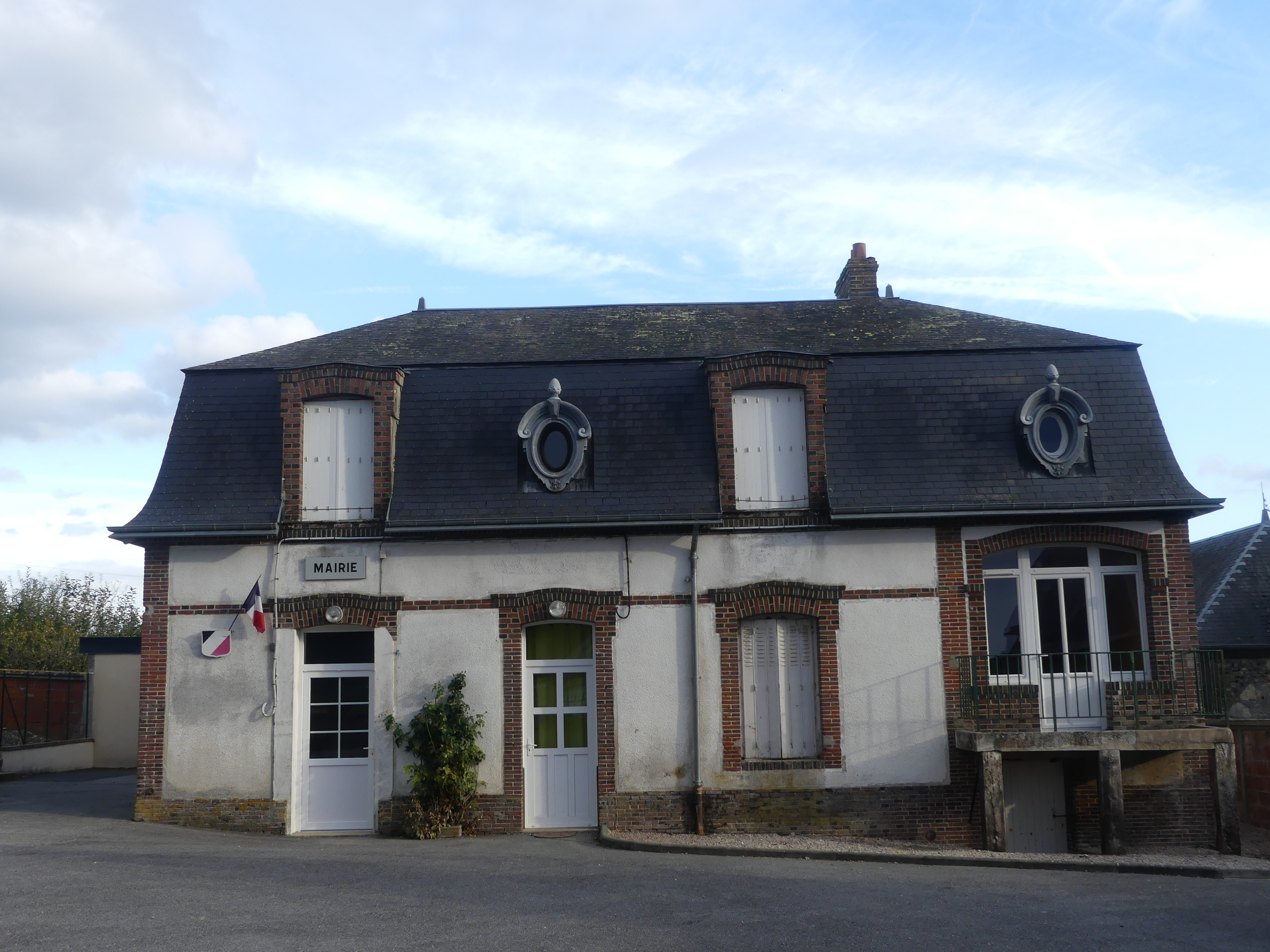
- The town hall in Saint-Aquilin-de-Corbion
- Location of Saint-Aquilin-de-Corbion
- Location within France Location within Normandy
- Coordinates: 48°38′08″N 0°30′54″E
- Country: France
- Region: Normandy
- Department: Orne
- Arrondissement: Mortagne-au-Perche
- Canton: Mortagne-au-Perche

Government
  - Mayor (2020–2026): Patrick Poisson
- Area^{1}: 6.1 km^{2} (2.4 sq mi)
- Elevation: 255 m (837 ft)
- Highest elevation: 281 m (922 ft)
- Lowest elevation: 191 m (627 ft)
- Population (2023): 60
  - Density: 9.8/km^{2} (25/sq mi)
- Time zone: UTC+01:00 (CET)
  - Summer (DST): UTC+02:00 (CEST)
- INSEE/Postal code: 61363 /61380
- ^{1} French Land Register data, which excludes lakes, ponds, glaciers > 1 km^{2} (0.386 sq mi or 247 acres) and river estuaries.

Saint-Aquilin-de-Corbion (French pronunciation: [sɛ̃.t‿akilɛ̃ də kɔʁbjɔ̃]) is a commune in the Orne department in north-western France.

== Geography ==
The commune is made up of the following collection of villages and hamlets, Le Houssay, Le Coudray, Friloux, Le Gibet, La Bellaillerie and Saint-Aquilin-de-Corbion.

The Commune along with another 70 communes shares part of a 47,681 hectare, Natura 2000 conservation area, called the Forêts et étangs du Perche.

The Sarthe river flows through the commune. Another river, the Iton flows through the commune. Two smaller watercourses also flow through the commune La Neuille Souris and Ruisseau de quincampoix.

== See also ==
- Communes of the Orne department
