= Saint-Martin-des-Pézerits =

- Commune
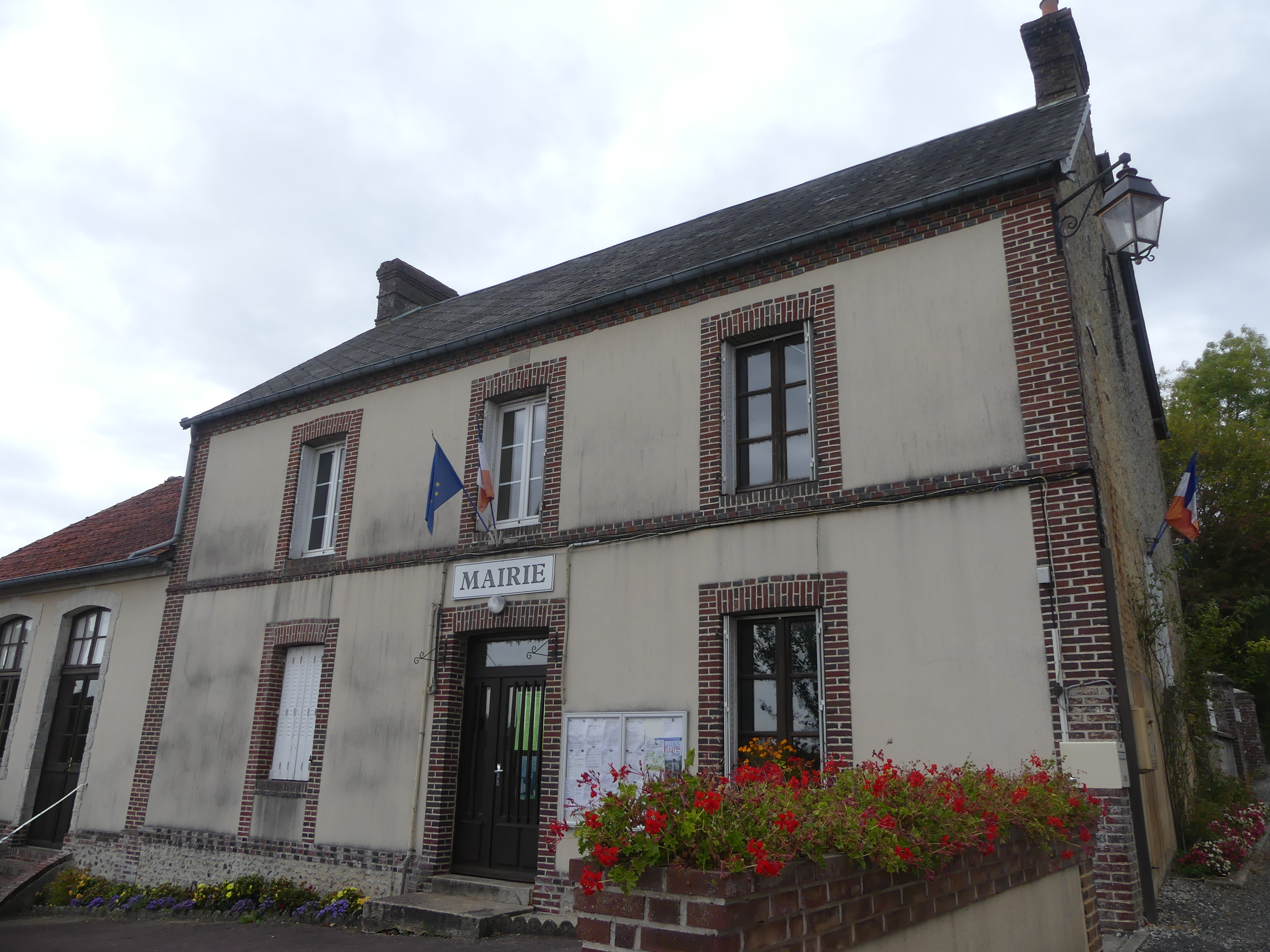
- The town hall in Saint-Martin-des-Pézerits
- Location of Saint-Martin-des-Pézerits
- Location within France Location within Normandy
- Coordinates: 48°38′01″N 0°29′28″E
- Country: France
- Region: Normandy
- Department: Orne
- Arrondissement: Mortagne-au-Perche
- Canton: Mortagne-au-Perche

Government
  - Mayor (2023–2026): Nicolas Andignac
- Area^{1}: 4.66 km^{2} (1.80 sq mi)
- Elevation: 237 m (778 ft)
- Highest elevation: 257 m (843 ft)
- Lowest elevation: 180 m (590 ft)
- Population (2023): 117
  - Density: 25.1/km^{2} (65.0/sq mi)
- Time zone: UTC+01:00 (CET)
  - Summer (DST): UTC+02:00 (CEST)
- INSEE/Postal code: 61425 /61380
- ^{1} French Land Register data, which excludes lakes, ponds, glaciers > 1 km^{2} (0.386 sq mi or 247 acres) and river estuaries.

Saint-Martin-des-Pézerits (French pronunciation: [sɛ̃ maʁtɛ̃ de pezʁi]) is a commune in the Orne department in north-western France.

== Geography ==
The commune along with another 32 communes is part of a 3,503 hectare, Natura 2000 conservation area, called the Haute vallée de la Sarthe.

The Sarthe river flows through the commune.

== See also ==
- Communes of the Orne department
