= Parfondeval, Orne =

Parfondeval
- Commune
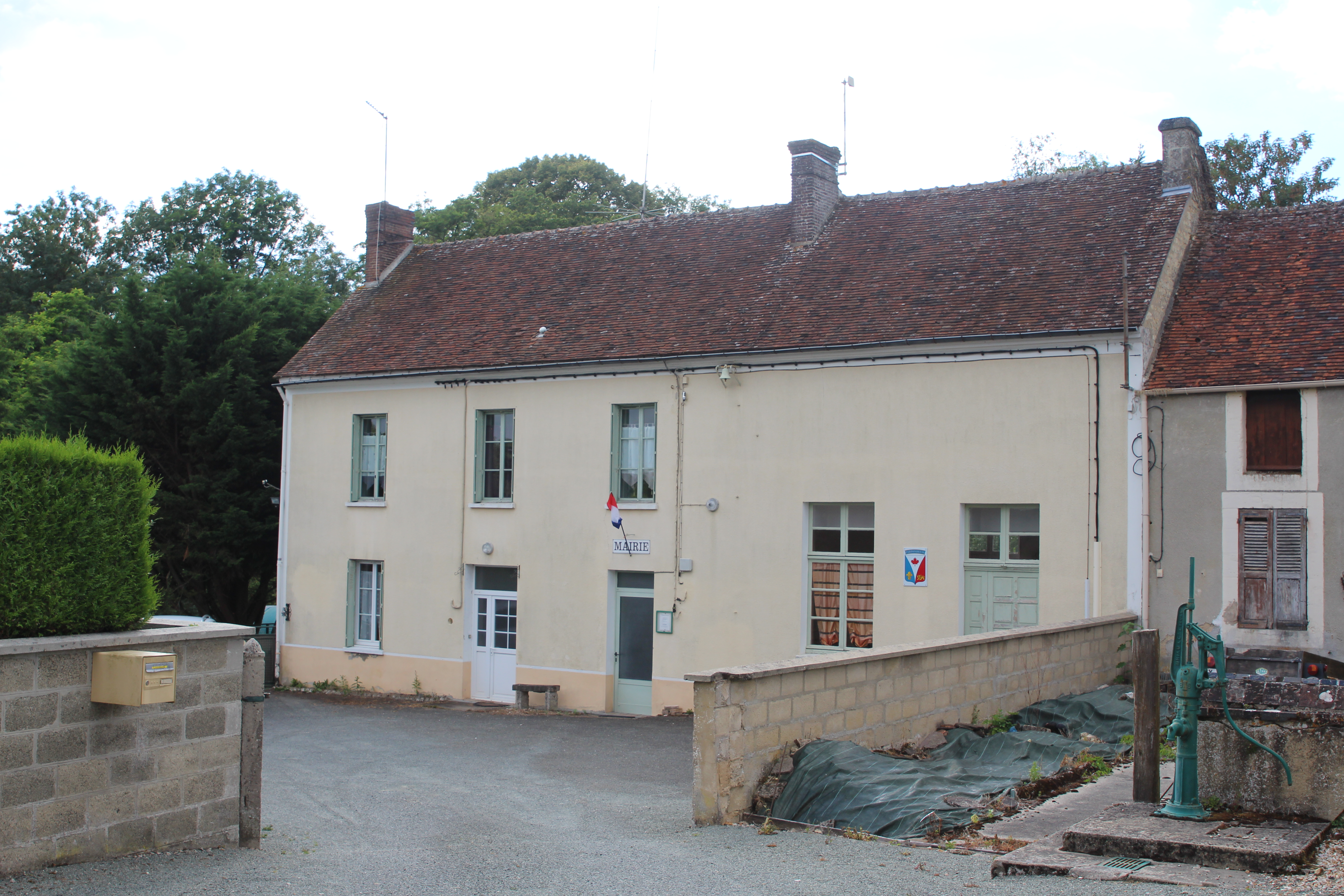
- Town hall
- Location of Parfondeval
- Location within France Location within Normandy
- Coordinates: 48°28′57″N 0°30′26″E
- Country: France
- Region: Normandy
- Department: Orne
- Arrondissement: Mortagne-au-Perche
- Canton: Mortagne-au-Perche

Government
  - Mayor (2020–2026): René Desjouis
- Area^{1}: 3.10 km^{2} (1.20 sq mi)
- Elevation: 120 m (390 ft)
- Highest elevation: 212 m (696 ft)
- Lowest elevation: 166 m (545 ft)
- Population (2023): 102
  - Density: 32.9/km^{2} (85.2/sq mi)
- Time zone: UTC+01:00 (CET)
  - Summer (DST): UTC+02:00 (CEST)
- INSEE/Postal code: 61322 /61400
- ^{1} French Land Register data, which excludes lakes, ponds, glaciers > 1 km^{2} (0.386 sq mi or 247 acres) and river estuaries.

Parfondeval (French pronunciation: [paʁfɔ̃dval]) is a commune in the Orne department in Normandy, northwestern France.

== Geography ==
The commune is made up of the following collection of villages and hamlets, Parfondeval and La Cosnière.

== See also ==
- Communes of the Orne department
