= Canton of Mortagne-au-Perche =

Coordinates: 48.52°N 0.55°E

The canton of Mortagne-au-Perche is an administrative division of the Orne department, northwestern France. Its borders were modified at the French canton reorganisation which came into effect in March 2015. Its seat is in Mortagne-au-Perche.

It consists of the following communes:

1. Bazoches-sur-Hoëne
2. Bellavilliers
3. Boëcé
4. Champeaux-sur-Sarthe
5. La Chapelle-Montligeon
6. Comblot
7. Corbon
8. Coulimer
9. Courgeon
10. Courgeoût
11. Feings
12. Loisail
13. Mauves-sur-Huisne
14. La Mesnière
15. Montgaudry
16. Mortagne-au-Perche
17. Parfondeval
18. Pervenchères
19. Le Pin-la-Garenne
20. Réveillon
21. Saint-Aquilin-de-Corbion
22. Saint-Aubin-de-Courteraie
23. Saint-Denis-sur-Huisne
24. Sainte-Céronne-lès-Mortagne
25. Saint-Germain-de-Martigny
26. Saint-Hilaire-le-Châtel
27. Saint-Jouin-de-Blavou
28. Saint-Langis-lès-Mortagne
29. Saint-Mard-de-Réno
30. Saint-Martin-des-Pézerits
31. Saint-Ouen-de-Sécherouvre
32. Soligny-la-Trappe
33. Villiers-sous-Mortagne
