= Huisne =

River in France

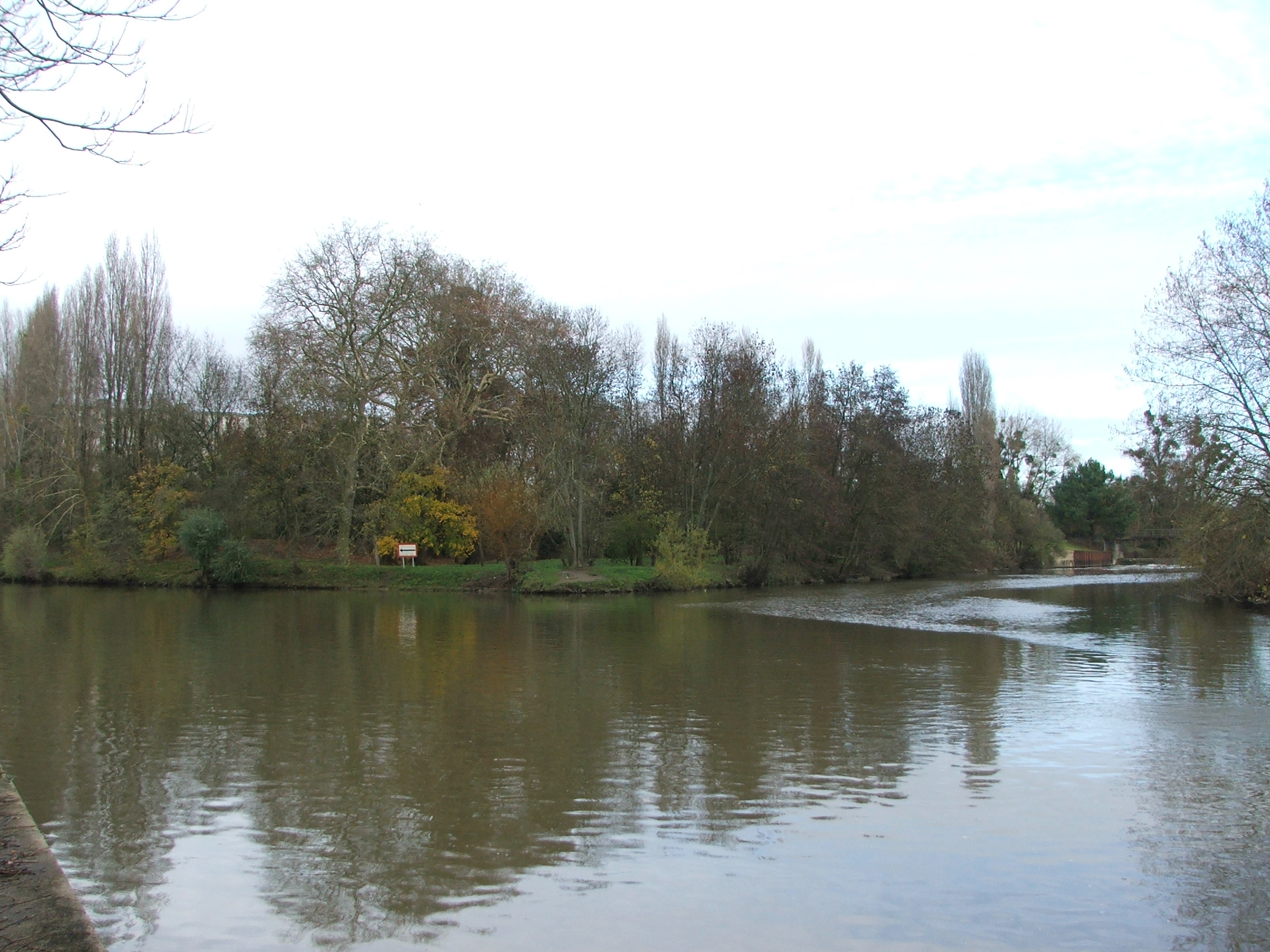

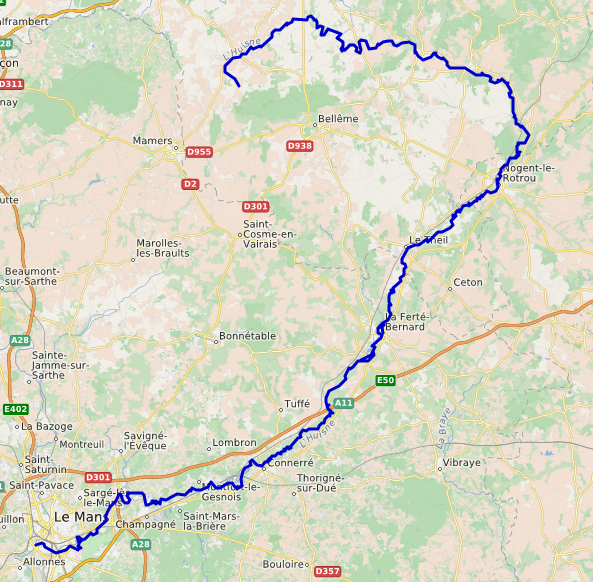
- Native name: L'Huisne (French)

Location
- Country: France

Physical characteristics
- Source
  - location: Perche
  - elevation: ±180 m (590 ft)
- Mouth
  - location: Sarthe
  - coordinates: 47°59′26″N 0°10′49″E
- Length: 164.5 km (102.2 mi)
- Basin size: 2,385 km^{2} (921 mi^{2})
- Discharge
  - average: 13.5 m^{3}/s (480 cu ft/s)

Basin features
- Progression: Sarthe→ Maine→ Loire→ Atlantic Ocean

The Huisne (French pronunciation: [ɥin]) is a 164.5 km (102.2 mi) long river in France. It is a left tributary of the river Sarthe, which it meets in Le Mans. Its source is near the town of Pervenchères, in the Orne department.

The Huisne flows through the following departments and towns:

- Orne: Saint-Jouin-de-Blavou, Rémalard, Condé-sur-Huisne, Le Theil
- Eure-et-Loir: Nogent-le-Rotrou
- Sarthe: La Ferté-Bernard, Montfort-le-Gesnois, Le Mans
