= Stage 3 of the 1952 Tour de France =

1952 Tour de France cycling race stage 3

The 3rd stage of the 1952 Tour de France took place on 27 June between Le Mans, which was hosting the Tour for the first time, and Rouen, which was hosting the Tour for the third time. The route crossed the departments of Sarthe, Orne, Eure, and Seine-Maritime on a mainly flat course with a few climbs, covering a distance of 189 kilometres (117 mi). It notably passed through the towns of Alençon, Sées, Bernay, Grand-Couronne, Petit-Couronne, and Grand-Quevilly.

This was the third of the twenty-three stages scheduled for the 39th edition of the Tour de France, in which Fausto Coppi started as the overwhelming favorite, in the absence of Hugo Koblet, winner of the previous edition, and Louison Bobet, the reigning French champion. At the start of the stage, the general classification was led by Belgian rider Rik Van Steenbergen, who had worn the yellow jersey since his victory in the first stage.

The stage victory was contested between two teammates from the French team. French rider Nello Lauredi finished ahead of Bernard Gauthier, who allowed him to take the win to secure the one-minute time bonus and claim the yellow jersey. Dutch rider Gerrit Voorting, also part of the breakaway, finished third, three minutes behind.

The stage is shorter than the average distance of Tour de France stages at the time. Only one serious breakaway is formed, and it manages to stay in the lead for virtually the entire stage. The seven riders — the term used for cyclists in a competitive race — enjoy a significant advantage for a time (up to 13 minutes) before the peloton reacts and reduces the gap somewhat. A crash near the end of the stage causes the breakaway to split apart, leaving the two riders from the French team alone in the lead. Four withdrawals are recorded during the stage.

The performance of the two French riders allowed the French team to win the stage, take the yellow jersey, win the stage team classification for the first time in this Tour, and move into the lead of that classification. Nello Lauredi also won the combativity award.

== Stage profile ==
The route of this stage was unprecedented, as no previous Tour de France stage had started from Le Mans before this edition. It followed the former Route nationale 138 for almost the entire stage between Le Mans and Rouen. The profile was mainly flat, with no major difficulties recorded. Finally, the stage distance was shorter than the averages known from previous editions of the Tour de France.:

=== First part (99 kilometres (62 mi)): a relatively flat section with a few short climbs ===
The first part began on the outskirts of Le Mans, in the quartier Gallière area, before joining the national road towards Alençon. This section included no major difficulties, except for a short climb at Piacé (km 28) with an average gradient of 4% over 1 kilometre (0.62 mi). Then, between Nonant-le-Pin and Saint-Evroult-de-Monfort, three steeper climbs were recorded: the first (km 83) with an average gradient of 4% over 3 kilometres (1.9 mi), the second (km 92) at 5.6% over 1 kilometre (0.62 mi), and the third (km 94) at 7.6% over 1 kilometre (0.62 mi). The total elevation gain for this section was about 700 metres (2,300 ft) over 100 kilometres (62 mi).

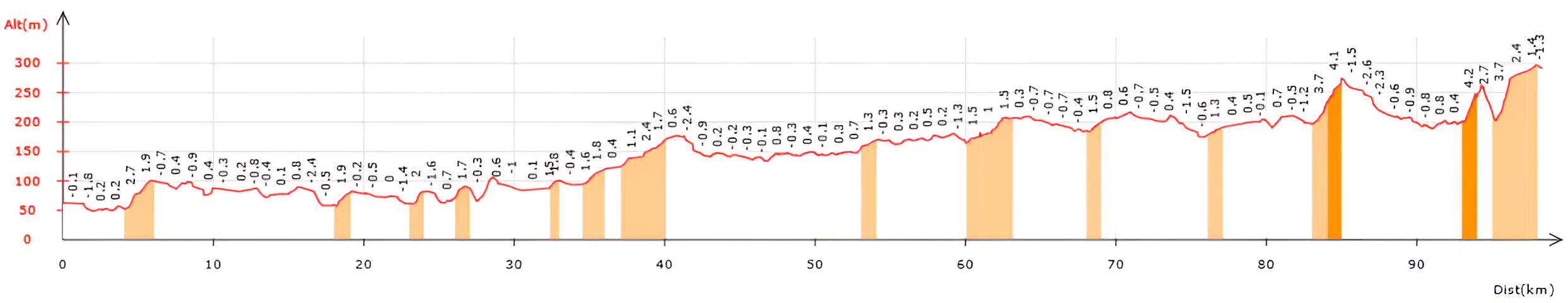
Altimetry profile of the first part of the stage (99 kilometres (62 mi)).

=== Second part (90 kilometres (56 mi)): a gently descending section with a rolling finish ===
The second part was also generally flat, with a gentle slope over the first thirty-six kilometers, followed by more undulating terrain toward the end. A first climb came after Brionne (km 149) at 4% over 1 kilometre (0.62 mi), followed by a short section of 800 metres (2,600 ft) at 8.2% before Bosrobert (km 154), and then the final climb before La Maison-Brûlée (Moulineaux), at 5.7% over 1 kilometre (0.62 mi). To finish, the route descended into the Seine valley and entered Rouen, with the finish located on the avenue de Caen at the end of a 1,700 metres (5,600 ft) straight. The total elevation gain for this section was about 450 metres (1,480 ft) over 90 kilometres (56 mi).

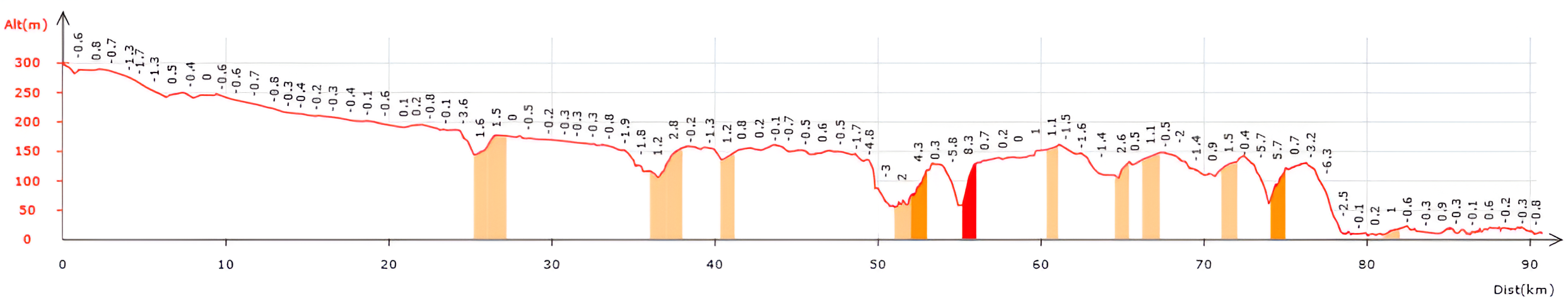
Altimetry profile of the second part of the stage (90 kilometres (56 mi)).

=== The organizer anticipates time gaps at the finish ===
The organizer, writing in L'Équipe, stated that the course conditions were conducive to noticeable time gaps: the stage was short, and the difficulties were located mid-stage, suggesting a fast second half. According to him, the yellow jersey should not be in danger, but "fluctuations are possible, and the result will likely not be quickly forgotten".

Route details of the 3rd stage
Department	Location	km	Department	Location	km
Sarthe	Le Mans	0	Orne	Marmouillé	76
Sarthe	La Bazoge	9	Orne	Nonant-le-Pin	80
Sarthe	Saint-Jean-d'Assé	15	Orne	Gacé	92
Sarthe	Saint-Marceau	19	Orne	Saint-Evroult-de-Monfort	93
Sarthe	Beaumont-sur-Sarthe	24	Orne	Monnai	106
Sarthe	Juillé	26	Eure	Broglie	123
Sarthe	Piacé	28	Eure	Bernay	134
Sarthe	La Hutte (Saint-Germain-sur-Sarthe)	33	Eure	Malbrouck crossroads (Carsix)	143
Sarthe	Fyé	36	Eure	Brionne	149
Sarthe	Oisseau-le-Petit	38	Eure	Saint-Martin-du-Parc (Le Bec-Hellouin)	152
Sarthe	Béthon	39	Eure	Bosrobert	154
Sarthe	Arçonnay	43	Eure	Bourgthéroude-Infreville	166
Orne	Alençon	47	Seine-Maritime	La Maison-Brûlée (Moulineaux)	173
Orne	Valframbert	51	Seine-Maritime	Moulineaux	175
Orne	Forges	55	Seine-Maritime	Grand-Couronne	179
Orne	Le Perron (Saint-Gervais-du-Perron)	59	Seine-Maritime	Petit-Couronne	183
Orne	Sées	68	Seine-Maritime	Le Grand-Quevilly	186
Orne	Chailloué	74	Seine-Maritime	Rouen, avenue de Caen	189

== Context at the start of the stage ==
Following the second stage between Rennes and Le Mans, journalists covering the Tour drew several conclusions about the balance of power and the form of the riders and teams at the start of the race.

=== The Belgian team dominates the start of the Tour ===
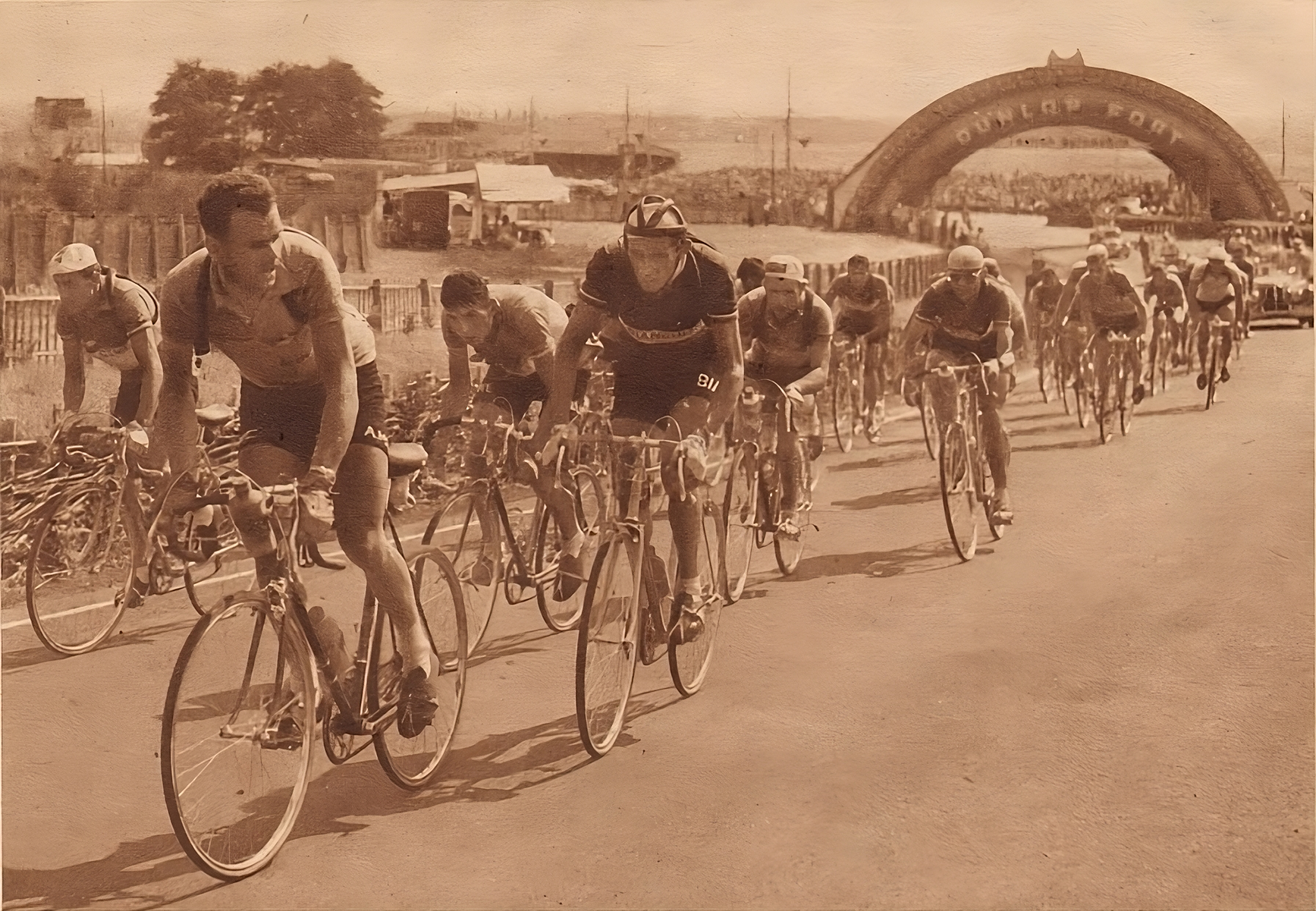
Rik Van Steenbergen leading the yellow jersey group on the Circuit des 24 Heures du Mans, ahead of Coppi.

The collective achievement of the Belgian team at the start of the Tour de France is unanimously praised by the international, national, and regional press, both for the performance of its riders and for the strategy adopted. Already holding the yellow jersey following the victory of Rik Van Steenbergen in the first stage, the team not only defends the lead in the general classification against attacks from the Italians and the French, but also manages to win the second stage thanks to the final breakaway of Rosseel and Close. After just two stages, the team has accumulated two stage victories, two wins in the stage team classification (Challenge International), two days leading both the individual general classification and the team general classification, and five riders in the top 10 of the individual general classification. The Belgians had not experienced such a strong start to the Tour since 1926.

=== Van Steenbergen aims to stay in "yellow" ===
Rik Van Steenbergen holds a lead of more than seven minutes over most of the favorites (including Fausto Coppi). A strong time trialist and talented rider, he is nevertheless not considered one of the main favorites for the Tour by observers, notably due to his limitations in the mountains. However, they believe he could keep the lead in the general classification until the first climbs.

In response to those who might doubt his ambitions, he himself pointed out that he finished second in the 1951 Giro d’Italia. Thus, during the second stage, he responded to attacks from the favorites and young regional riders seeking a stage victory, defending his yellow jersey and proving that he intended to keep it for as long as possible.

=== A draw between the Tour favorites ===
Aware of the status of clear favorite held by Fausto Coppi, the recent winner of the Giro d’Italia, the French team adopted an offensive strategy during the first two stages in an attempt to gain time before the first mountain climbs. Their attacks and attempts were numerous, but were systematically countered by the defensive strategy of the Italian team, with counterattacks from Coppi himself on several occasions.

In the end, after the first two stages, none of the presumed favorites from either team managed to gain an advantage over the others. However, several weaknesses were observed among their teammates, both on the Italian and French sides (including Fiorenzo Magni and Muller).

This situation raises questions about their ability to support their leaders in the remainder of the race. Some observers believe that these weaknesses could encourage teams, in the following days, to ease the attacks carried out against each other.

== Race progression ==
=== Stage summary ===
Note: (Note: Given the approximate nature of some stage summaries written by the national press of the time, and despite cross-checking of sources, inaccuracies may remain in the mileage of events and the composition of breakaways.)

==== Start from Le Mans and formation of the first breakaway ====
On the morning of 27 June, the cyclists had a precise schedule to follow before the start of the race:

- 10:00: signing-in and refreshments at Place des Jacobins, in front of the municipal theatre of Le Mans;
- 10:50: rider roll call;
- 11:05: start of the parade via Rue des Jacobins, Rue Claude-Blondeau, Rue Marchande, Rue Dumas, Place de la République, Rue Gambetta, Rue Montoise, Avenue Louis-Cordelet, and the road to Alençon;
- 11:15: official start of the stage in front of the BP service station.

The expected weather was sunny and very hot, with an unfavorable east–northeast headwind.

On leaving Le Mans, the 117 riders took the Route nationale 138 and, almost immediately, two riders from the West/South-East regional team, Tino Sabbadini and Jacques Vivier, gained a lead of about one hundred meters over the peloton. They were joined by Maurice Quentin (France) and Giovanni Corrieri (Italy), but the latter did not cooperate, leaving the effort to the regional riders. This proved insufficient to maintain the breakaway, and they were quickly caught by the peloton.

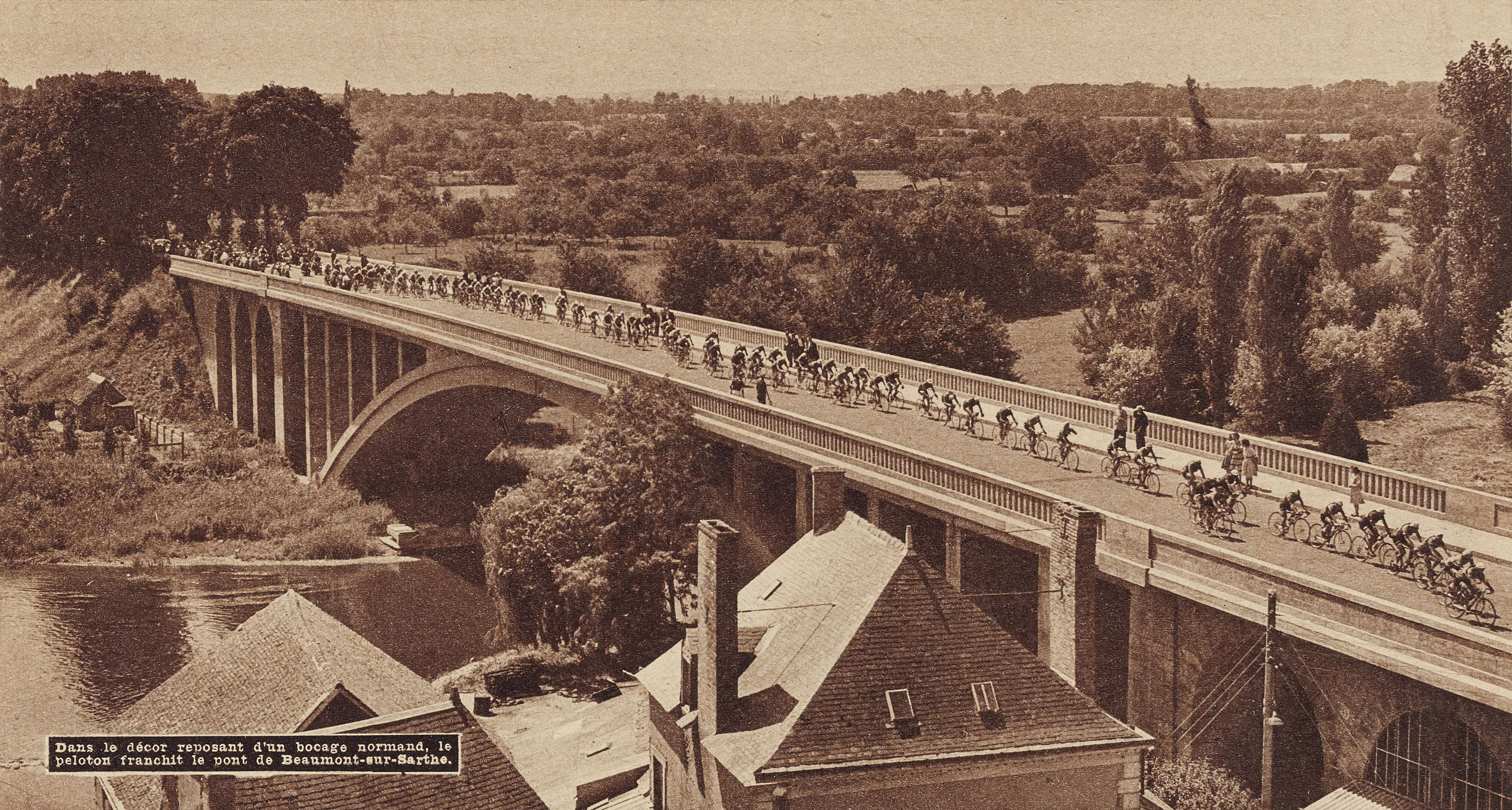
Passage of the peloton at Beaumont-sur-Sarthe.

A second breakaway quickly forms following an attack by the French rider Roger Buchonnet (North-East / Centre), joined by Corrieri (Italy). At La Bazoge (km 9), it already has a 30-second lead over the peloton. The duo is joined at km 15 by Bernard Gauthier, who makes the effort to bridge the gap.

His initiative is successfully imitated, after several attempts, by his teammate Nello Lauredi. He is followed by Louis Caput (Paris), Gerrit Voorting (Netherlands, (Note: Although the official name of the country is the Netherlands, the Dutch team was referred to in the press of the time by synecdoche as the “Holland” team, and the riders were categorized as “Hollanders”, terms which are therefore used in this article.) Édouard Fachleitner (South-East), and Ettore Milano (Italy), who manage to break away from the peloton. The five riders catch up with the leading trio at Juillé (km 25), which then holds only a one-minute advantage over the peloton. Shortly afterward, Milano suffers a puncture and is caught again by the peloton.

Behind them, the Belgian rider Maurice Blomme also punctures, forcing his team—tasked with defending the yellow jersey of Rik Van Steenbergen—to slow down slightly and allow four riders to drop back to wait for him.

==== The gap widens between the breakaway and the peloton over about 100 kilometres ====
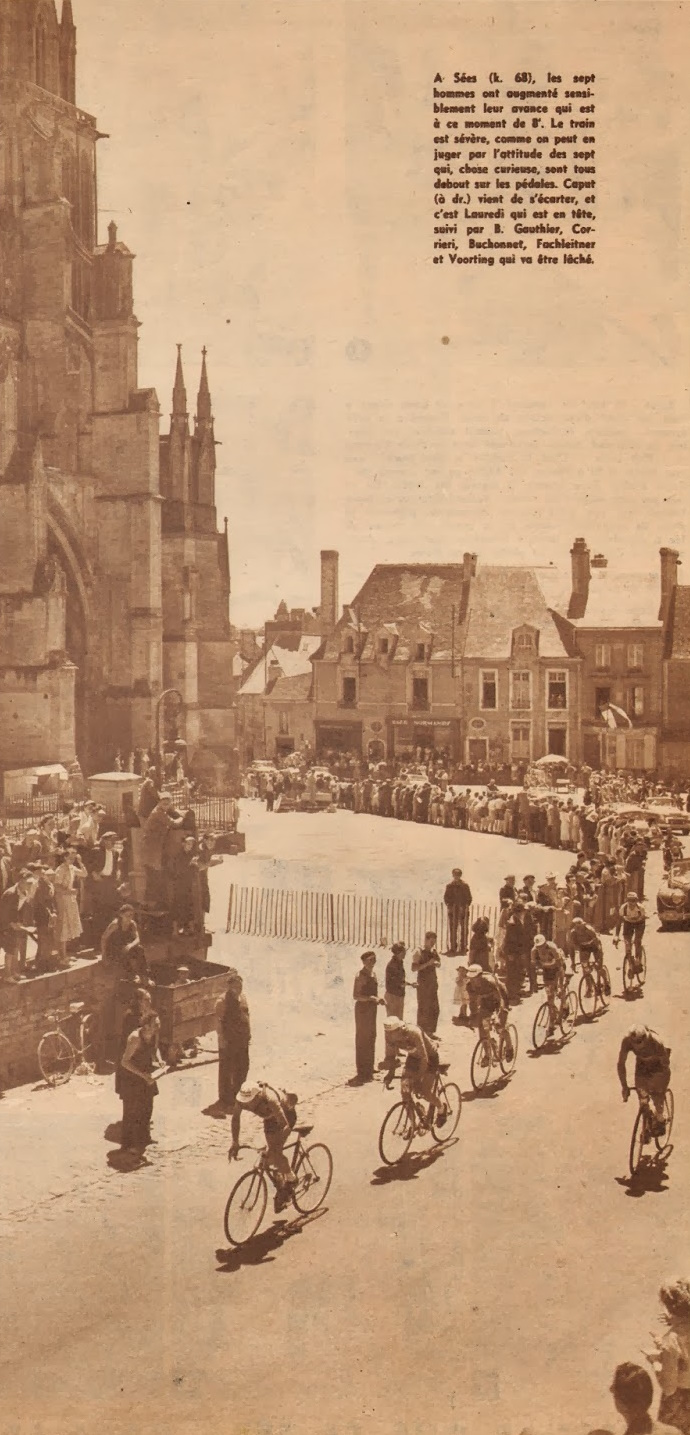
Passage of the breakaway group at Sées.

The gap gradually increases. Shortly before passing near Fyé (km 35), the seven leading riders have a one-minute advantage over Gilbert Bauvin (North-East / Centre), who has attacked, and a lead of 2 minutes 10 seconds over the peloton. The leaders are riding five minutes ahead of the schedule, at an average speed of 40.5 km/h during the first hour. Twelve kilometers later, in Alençon (km 47), the gap has grown to 4 minutes 50 seconds. Bauvin is caught, while Jean-Marie Cieleczka (North-East / Centre) attempts to break away.

Meanwhile, the Belgian team is once again slowed down by a puncture suffered by Robert Vanderstockt, who is also waited for by his teammates. In the peloton, several riders are dropped and abandon, including Germain Derijcke (Belgium), who had been suffering since the previous day and was dropped from km 30, André Dufraisse (West / South-West), who was suffering from boils, and Robert Ducard (North-East / Centre), who was also ill.

Roger Rossinelli (North-East / Centre) attempts to bridge across to the breakaway but fails to create a gap. Meanwhile, members of the French team take control at the front of the peloton while trying to slow its pace. The breakaway continues to gain time: 6 minutes 50 seconds at Le Perron (km 59), 8 minutes at Sées (km 68), and 9 minutes 30 seconds at Nonant-le-Pin (km 79). At that point, Fachleitner (South-East) becomes the virtual yellow jersey holder.

Bad luck continues for the Belgian team, as Eduard Van Ende crashes and injures himself, cutting his left heel on a feeding bottle. Once again, Belgian riders are forced to slow down to help their teammate rejoin the peloton.

In the breakaway group, Buchonnet (North-East / Centre) suffers a puncture around Gacé but manages to get back to the front.

The pace of the peloton does not increase, allowing the gap to widen. The lead of the front group reaches 11 minutes 45 seconds at km 110, then 13 minutes 45 seconds at km 123. Buchonnet (North-East / Centre) suffers another puncture in the vicinity of Broglie, and this time is unable to get back to the front. He gradually decides to let himself be caught by the peloton.

==== The peloton's response after the Broglie feed zone ====
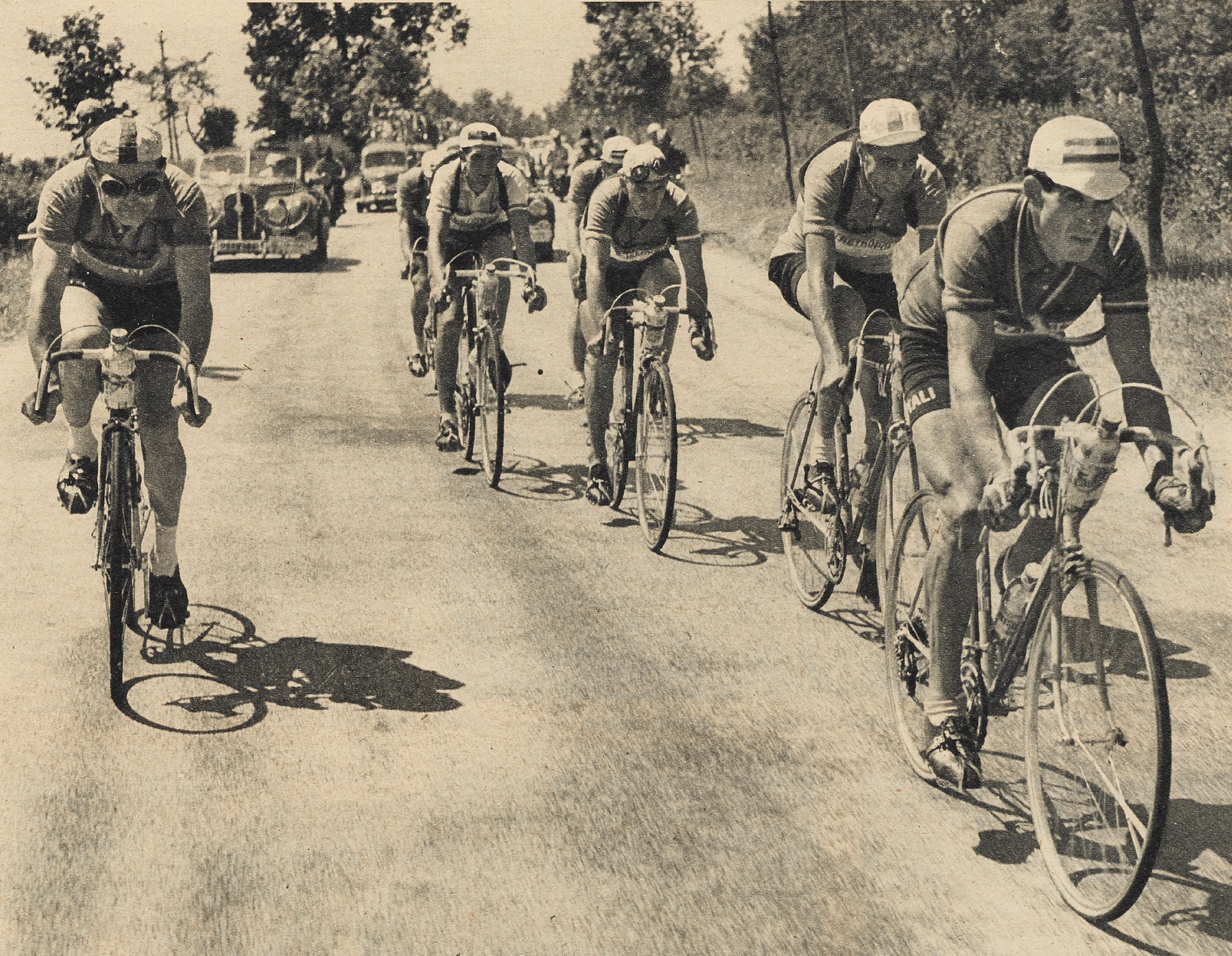
The composition of the breakaway, with Corrieri in front, ahead of Buchonnet, and Caput to his right.

After Broglie and the feeding control, the pace of the peloton increases while the gap peaks at 14 minutes 5 seconds. At km 147, the six riders in the lead are 7 minutes 20 seconds ahead of Buchonnet (North-East / Centre), who has fallen behind, and 12 minutes 3 seconds ahead of the peloton. By km 156, the lead has been reduced to 11 minutes 10 seconds.

==== The showdown among the six leading riders ====
With 21 kilometres (13 mi) to go, Corrieri (Italy) punctures and must let the other five breakaway riders go. In this group, Caput (Paris), with his strong time-trialing abilities, appears as the favorite for the stage win, while Fachleitner (South-East) is best placed to take the yellow jersey. Since km 80, he has held a sufficient advantage to overtake Van Steenbergen in the general classification and has a six-second lead over Lauredi (France), the other well-placed rider in the breakaway. The riders descend at high speed and cross a level crossing before tackling the climb of La Maison-Brûlée (km 171). Fachleitner’s (South-East) chain slips, and he is forced to swerve, grabbing onto Caput (Paris), which also causes a crash involving Voorting (Netherlands),, The two members of the French team, Lauredi and Gauthier, manage to avoid the accident and head together towards Rouen. Voorting (Netherlands) gets back on his bike and resumes without much delay, followed shortly by Fachleitner (South-East). Caput (Paris), however, having broken his rear wheel, is injured in the arm and leg.

At full speed, the two French riders cross the finish line, with Bernard Gauthier allowing his teammate Nello Lauredi to take the win so that he could benefit from the one-minute time bonus. Gerrit Voorting (Netherlands) crosses the line in third position, 3 minutes 25 seconds behind the two French riders. Corrieri (Italy), who had caught up with Fachleitner (South-East) in the meantime, finishes with a delay of 6 minutes. The peloton, which had caught Caput (Paris), finishes the stage 10 minutes 31 seconds behind.

Photographs of events during the stage

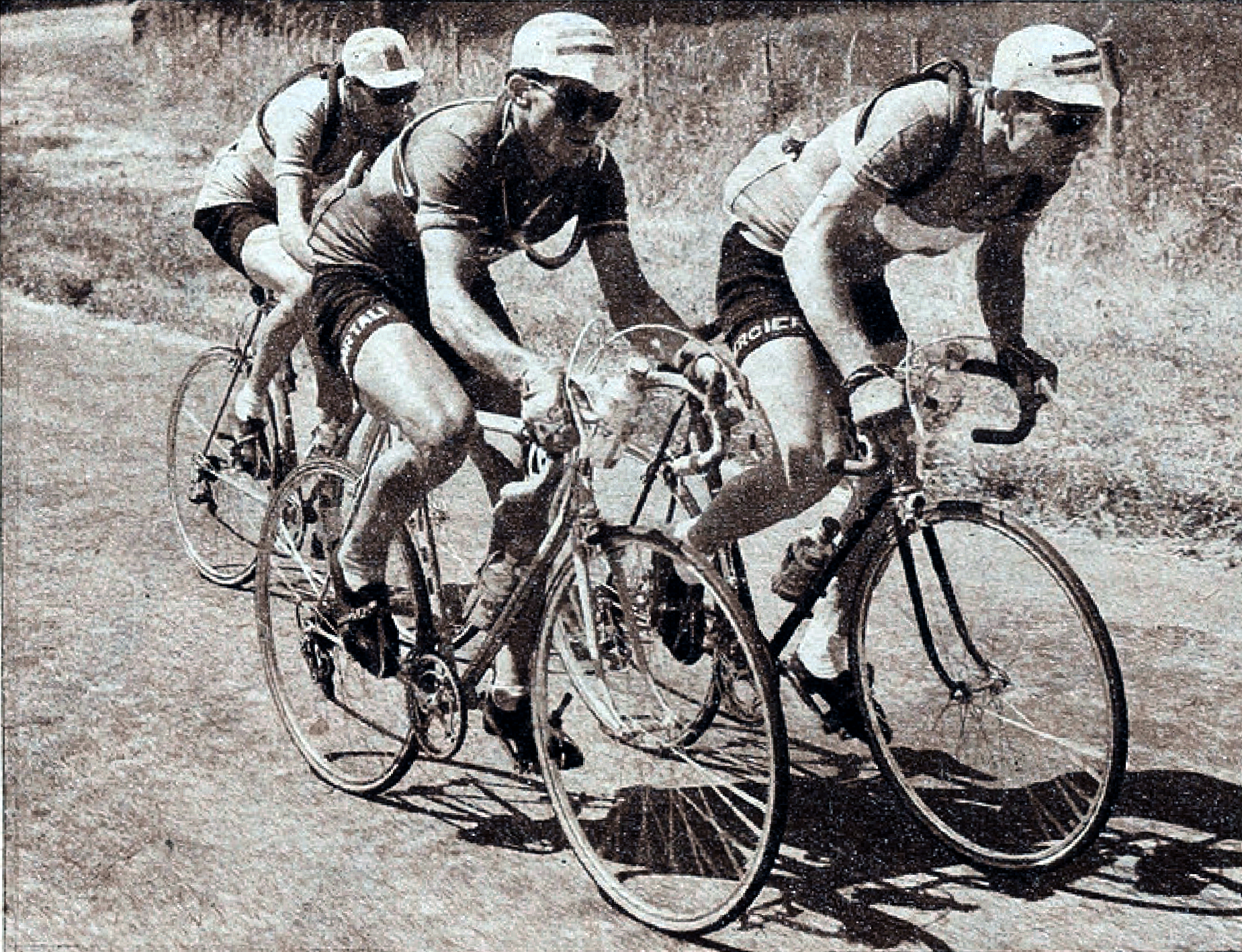
Gauthier (France), Corrieri (Italy) and Buchonnet (North-East / Centre) in a breakaway at Saint-Jean-d'Assé (km 15).

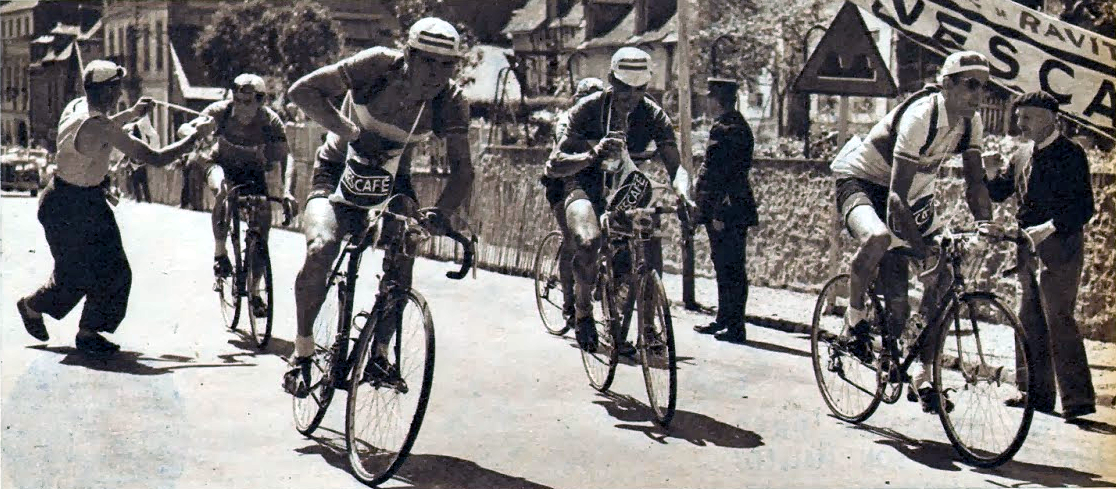
Breakaway feeding at Broglie (km 123). In the foreground: Gauthier (France), Corrieri (Italy) and Voorting (Netherlands).

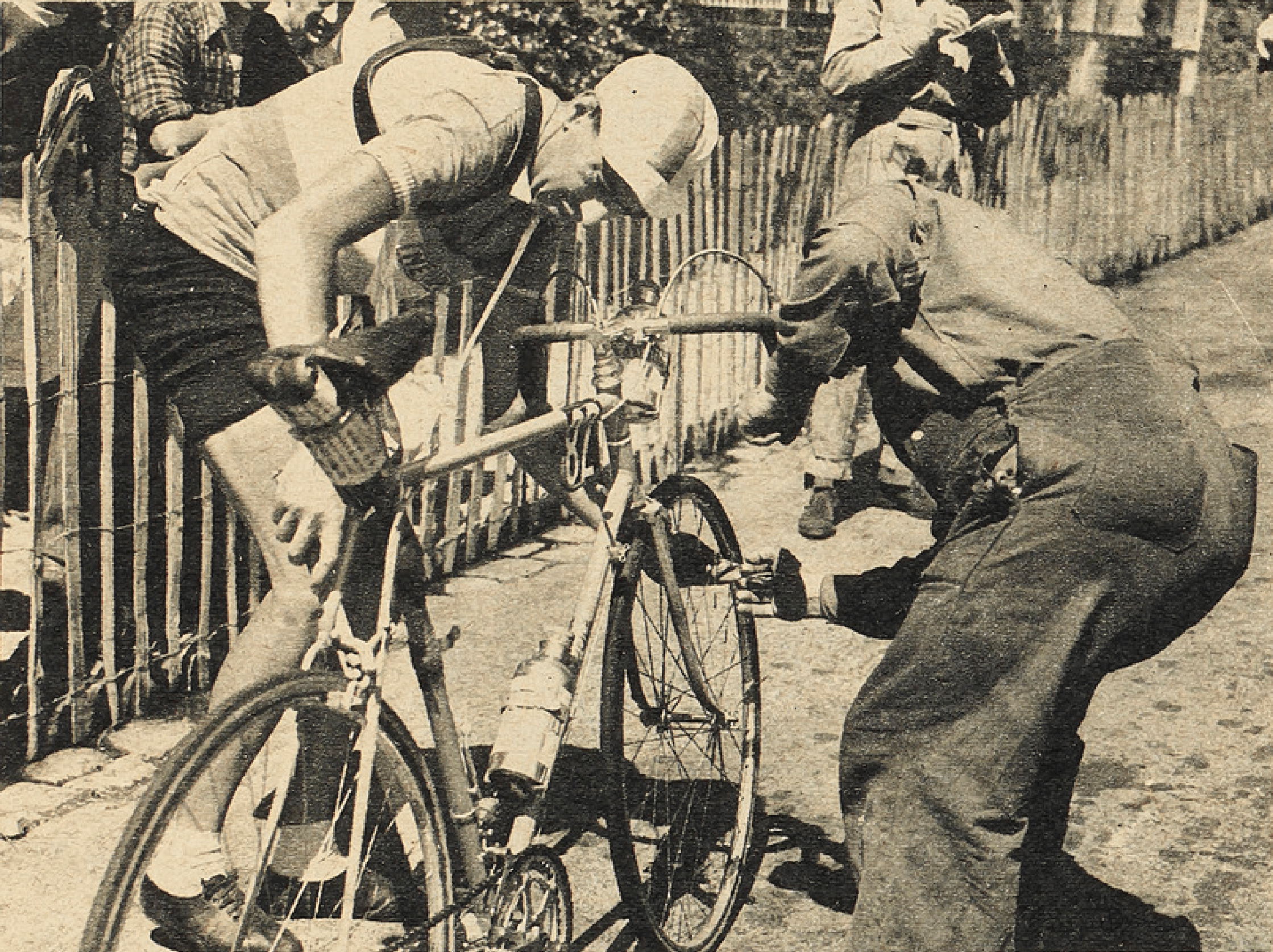
Buchonnet (North-East / Centre) punctures near Broglie.

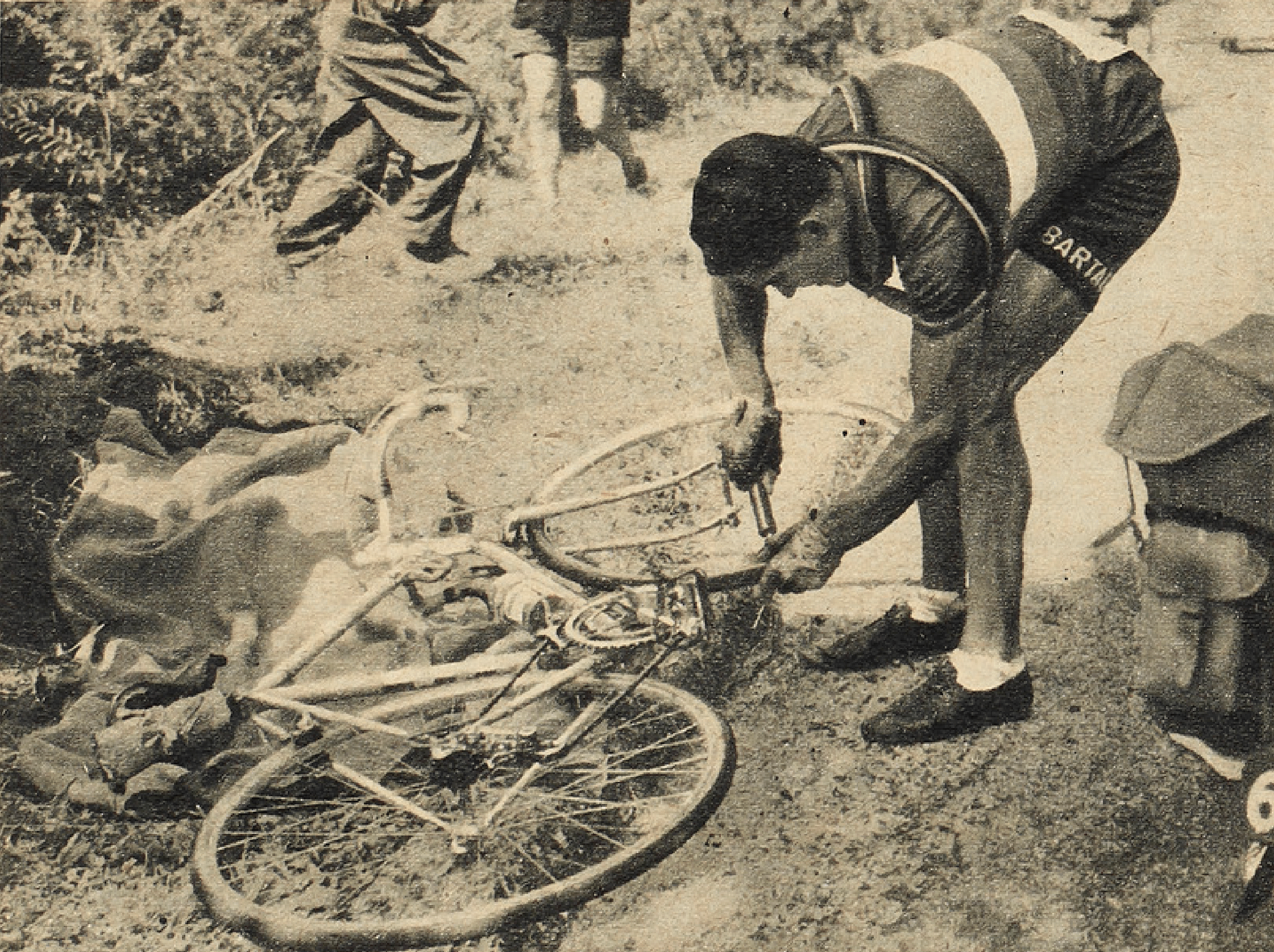
Corrieri (Italy) also punctures and sees the breakaway move away (km 168).

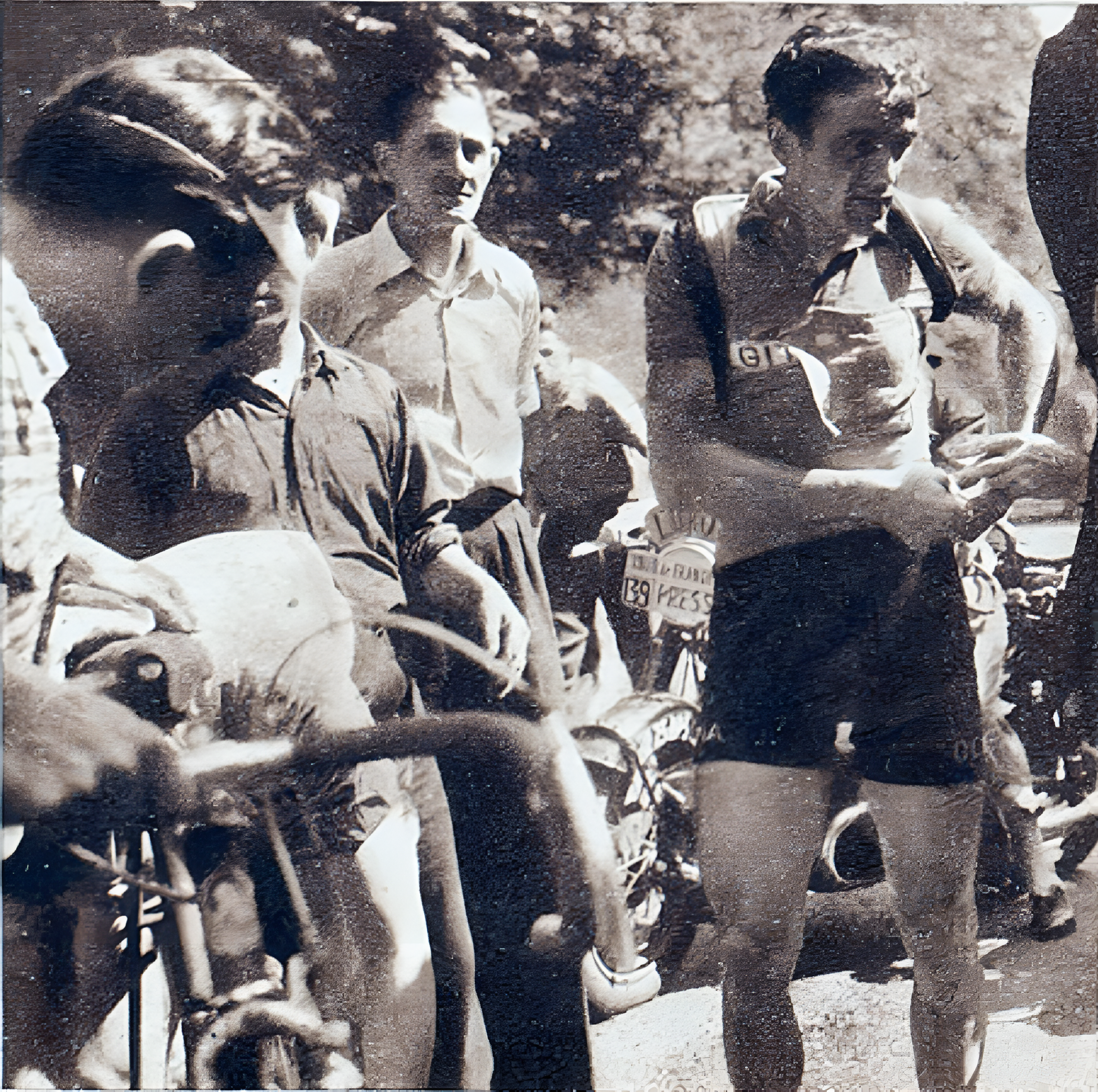
Louis Caput (Paris) after his crash, surrounded by the crowd, waiting for his bike to be repaired (km 171).

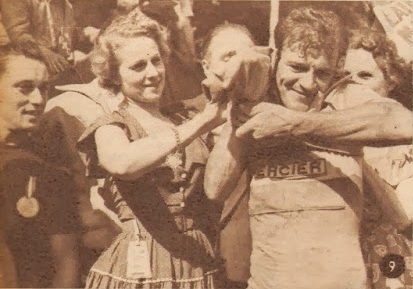
Lauredi (France) puts on the yellow jersey while Van Steenbergen has not yet arrived.

=== Around the race ===
==== Organizational issues reported in the press ====
In the newspaper Libération of 28 June, Jacques Marchand criticizes the accommodation conditions of some regional riders (notably those in Le Mans), which are not always ideal, citing issues related to food, noise, and lack of tranquility. Staying in hotels filled with guests who had come specifically for the Tour, or near the main square of Le Mans where concerts were taking place, the conditions were, in his view, not worthy of such a long and demanding event. Jean Deler of L'Ardennais shares the same opinion, noting that the late-night fireworks were not appreciated by all the riders.

Another organizational issue occurred when the publicity caravan following the race was involved in a pile-up after Corrieri suffered a puncture on a narrow road. Due to a lack of anticipation, several motorcycles fell, and cars crashed into each other.

Finally, at the finish, Lauredi’s (France) lead was so large that he received his yellow jersey even before the peloton arrived. However, assistants from the Sofil brand had him put it on before the regulatory 6 minutes 27 seconds had elpased, corresponding to his deficit to Van Steenbergen. This breach of the rules did not prevent him from starting his lap of honor, which he completed just as the Belgian finished his stage and crossed the line in Rouen.

==== The heat continues to accompany the Tour ====
The weather during the stage remains very hot, and riders repeatedly give in to what is known as the “can hunt”, which consists of quickly entering a shop to collect cans and bottles to bring back to their teammates. As this task falls to domestiques, many reports of crowding in roadside shops appear in the press. Although the regulations state that riders must pay for their purchases, numerous incidents involving unpaid items are reported in newspapers.

The heat of the stage forces cyclists to find any way to cool down

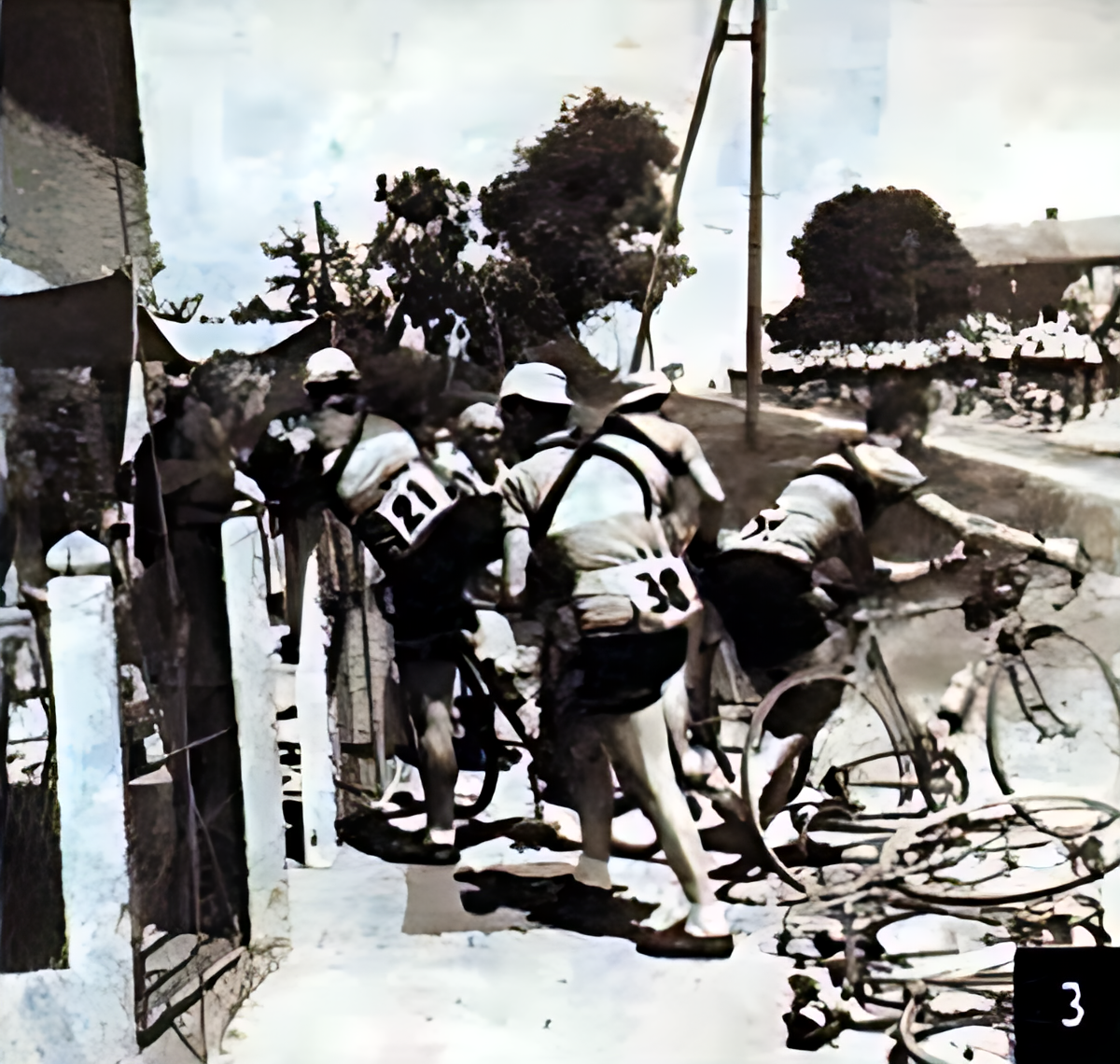
Mario Baroni (Italy), Robert Vanderstockt (Belgium), and Willy Kemp (Luxembourg) go to fetch water from a roadside café.

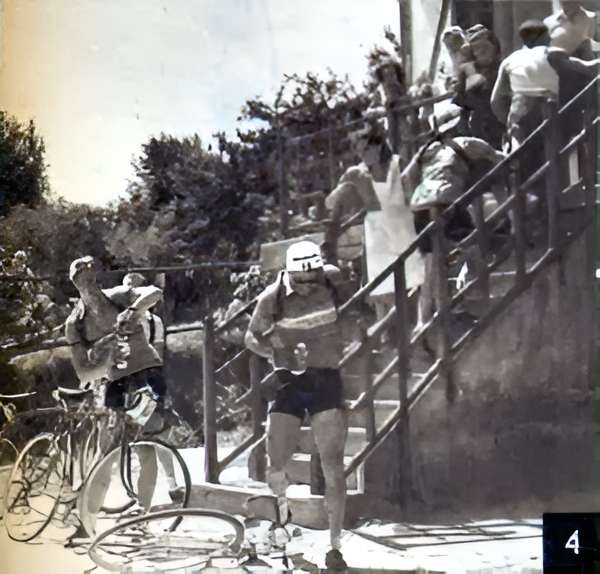
Henri Van Kerckhove (Belgium), Andrés Trobat (Spain) and Antonin Rolland (France) also stop at a shop to get refreshments.

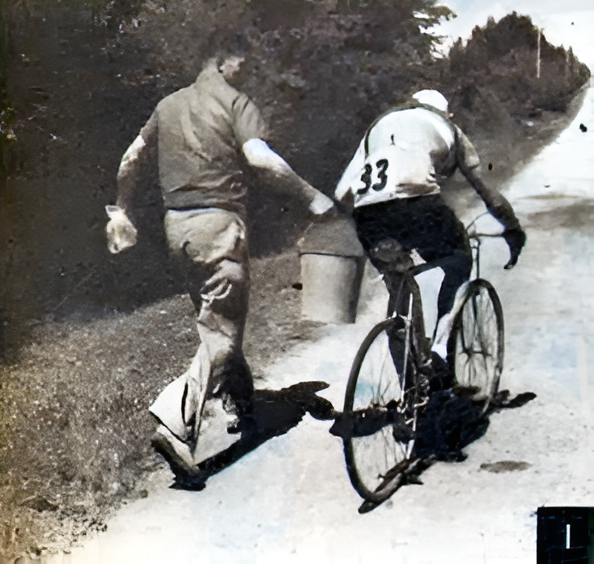
A spectator offers a bucket of water to Robert Bonnaventure (France) so that he can cool down.

== Stage summary ==
=== Key moments of the stage ===
==== The achievement of the French riders Lauredi and Gauthier ====
The performance of the "tricolores", particularly that of the two French riders Nello Lauredi and Bernard Gauthier, is widely praised in the press. Thanks to their breakaway and victory, they succeeded in taking the yellow jersey and the lead in the team classification from the Belgian team.

Lauredi had already delivered a strong performance in the first stage by gaining time on Coppi, but disappointed in the second by losing his advantage. Brilliant in the third, he is regarded by many journalists as a serious yellow jersey holder, especially as he now holds an eleven-minute lead over Coppi. Delighted to wear the first yellow jersey of his career (also the first for the French team since 1948[42]) and to claim his third Tour de France stage win, the Italian-born rider is already looking ahead: "I know that Coppi will return the favor one of these days. But this time I will be on my guard and will make the necessary effort. It is no longer time to ride conservatively. The Tour de France is well underway. One must never put off until tomorrow…" He adds that he has only one regret: "that I could not let Bernard win the stage. He deserved it for the work he did in the breakaway".

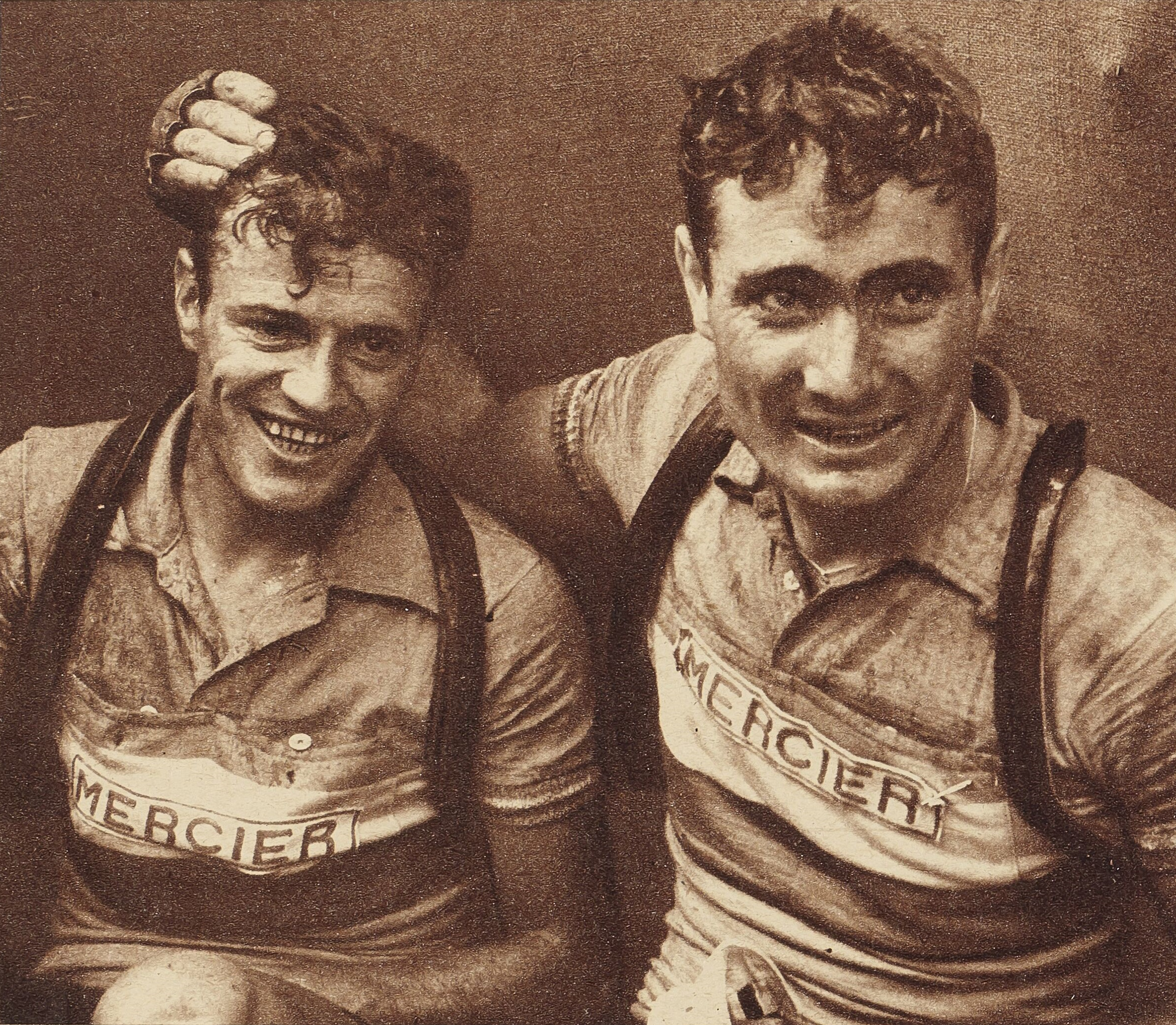
Lauredi (left) and Gauthier (right) celebrating their first and second places at the end of the stage.

Gauthier’s performance is also praised in the press. He expresses his willingness to continue supporting "his friend", stating: "I am ready to do it again tomorrow if necessary to help Nello keep his jersey. Everyone takes turns, I have had mine. Yes, but he does not get dropped in the climbs". Alongside their performance, the luck they had in avoiding the crash in the breakaway is also highlighted.

The collective attitude of the French team is also noted. In the peloton, the other "tricolores" worked to slow the pace as much as possible to increase the gap. Géminiani, who spent the day in the peloton, acknowledged the failure of the strategy used in the first two stages: "In the first two stages, we attacked only to end up each time with Coppi and without any benefit for a French rider […]. We understood". Faced with the impossibility of breaking away, he explains the change in approach: "We had agreed to stay in the peloton to draw the attention of our rivals, thus allowing one of our teammates to break away more easily. The move had to succeed. It succeeded".

However, the French strategy is criticized in Rouen by Italian riders: "We understand that they did not lead, but instead of mixing with us, they should have let us organize the chase".

==== The misfortune of the Belgian team ====
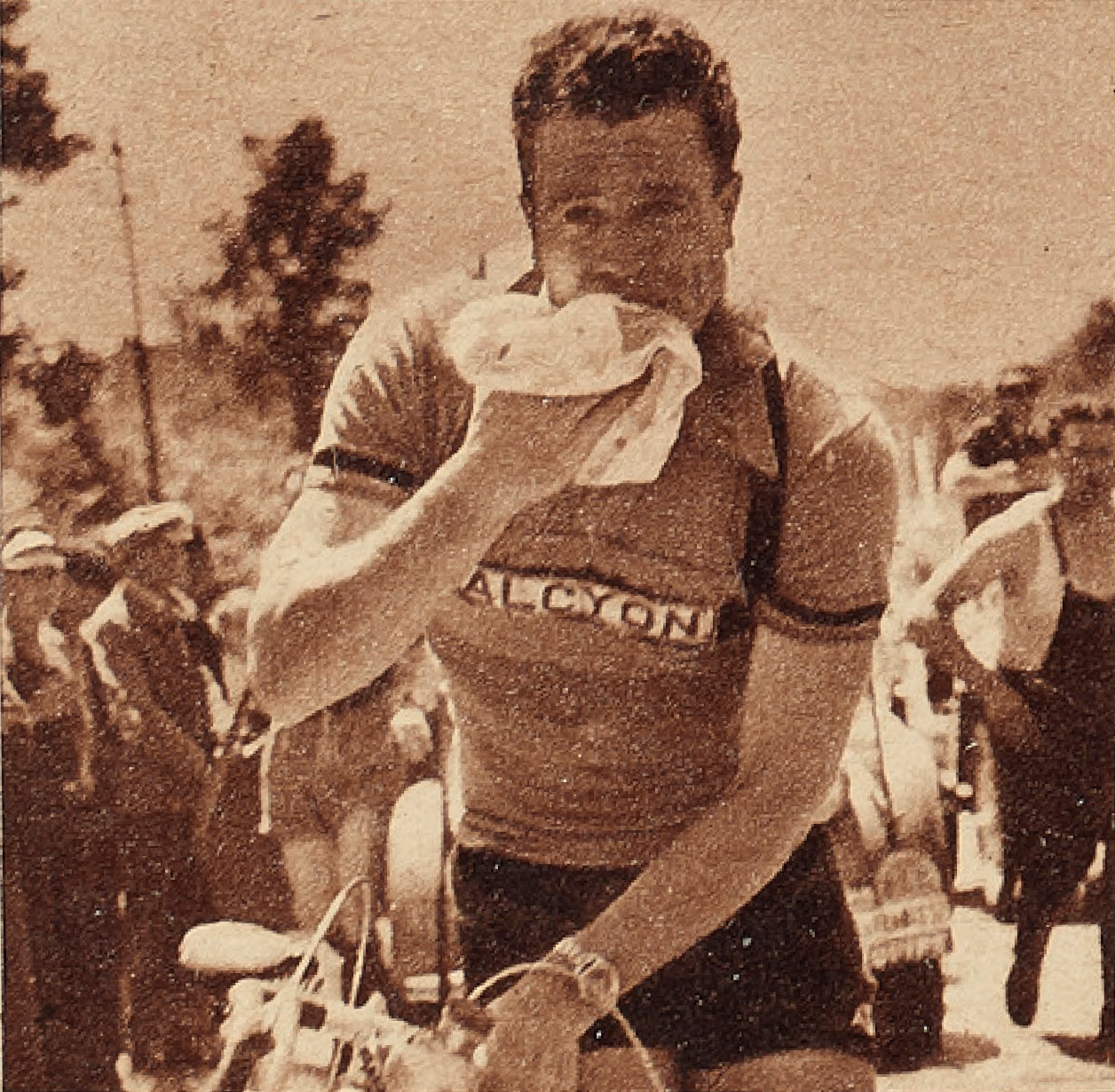
Ill and suffering from throat pain, Derijcke (Belgium) abandons during the stage.

The Belgian team is faced with a series of setbacks. After dominating the first two stages, it encountered numerous difficulties during the third, notably with punctures, crashes, and a withdrawal. Overall, the fatigue from the efforts made at the start of the Tour is believed to be responsible for the lack of a collective response in defending the yellow jersey. Only Rik Van Steenbergen and Stan Ockers truly take part in chasing the breakaway.

Van Steenbergen defends himself by stating: “I had no one at my side at the moment of the attack at the start.” He also admits that he did not believe in the breakaway’s chances of lasting, due to the headwind the riders were facing. Likewise, he expected a stronger reaction from the Italians against the “threat” posed by Nello Lauredi. The former leader nevertheless downplays the loss of the yellow jersey, pointing to the bad luck that affected his team that day: “My teammates were tired from the first two stages. Bad luck played its part… and the French easily controlled Ockers and me.”

==== Fachleitner and Caput, the other unlucky riders ====
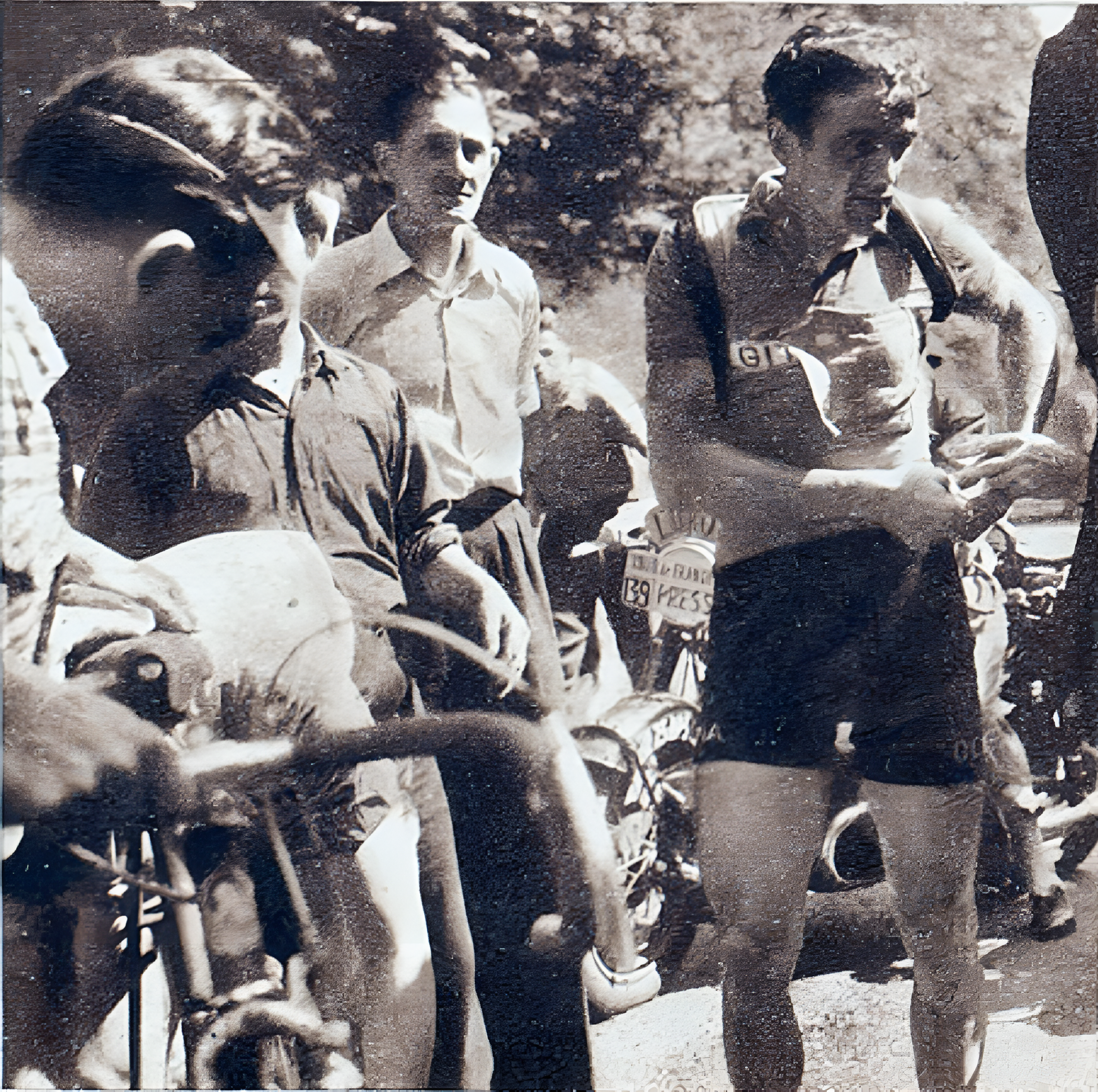
Caput (Paris), one of the biggest losers of the day after his crash.

Fachleitner (South-East) and Caput (Paris) both had reasons to be pleased with having chosen the right breakaway: Fachleitner was, for part of the stage, the rider best placed in the group to take the yellow jersey, while Caput was the favorite to win the stage in a sprint.

Unfortunately for them, their crash ruined their chances. Fachleitner finished 5th in the stage and 6th overall; he put things into perspective, saying: “I don’t have the yellow jersey, which is a pity. I regret it especially for my teammates, but I am now well placed in the general classification. There is nothing to say that my day will not come at last.” Fachleitner also received the prize for the unluckiest rider at the end of the stage.

As for Caput (Paris), he finished far behind, caught by the peloton, and could not hide his bitterness at the finish: “My elbow injury is nothing serious, just a scratch, but what frustration when I saw my dream collapse! Yes, I dreamed of returning to the forefront and, by leading this breakaway, I already saw myself second or third in the general classification! It took ten minutes to find me a replacement bike, Papazian’s, and then I had to lower the saddle and change a tire. What terrible luck! I could cry!”

==== Significant gaps at the end of the Stage 3 ====
Although the Tour is only at the end of its third day, the gaps in the general classification are already considerable between the yellow jersey and the group of favorites (more than eleven minutes). Fausto Coppi, considered the main favorite by all observers, reacted on the evening of the stage: “We should never have let Lauredi go. We know his abilities and we know he is dangerous.” Implicitly acknowledging tensions within the Italian team, he added that if he had been the sole leader, he would have personally led the chase to avoid losing this valuable time, which would eventually have to be made up: “In the first two stages, I was always the one responding to the attacks of the French and the Belgians. I don’t want to keep sacrificing myself all the time. Everyone must take their turn…”.

=== Team summary ===
The teams competing in the 1952 Tour de France have represented both nations and regions since 1930. A new regulation was introduced in the 1952 edition: the creation of a team classification at the end of each stage (based on the combined times of the three best riders from each team at the finish), accompanied by a bonus awarded to both the leading team and the leading regional team (these bonuses could be combined).

This “race within the race” was an innovation deliberately introduced by the organizers so that every rider would remain in contention until Paris, encouraging the development of team tactics that were both subtle and engaging. Indeed, the Tour’s management sought to make the team victory comparable in importance to the individual victory, highlighting the performances of domestiques alongside their leaders, as well as the impact of weaker riders or those losing time on the overall team standings.

List of the top 3 riders per team and key highlights
Team classification and top riders,	Analysis in regional, national and international press
Switzerland (sports director: A. Burtin): 8/8 riders still in the race.
Team ranking in Stage 3: 12th	In the Swiss newspaper L’Impartial, journalist Lelio Rigassi highlights the bad luck of the Swiss riders, affected by mechanical problems and crashes. Three riders finished the stage behind after two of them waited for Walter Kreiser, who crashed and had to change bikes. According to Rigassi, Switzerland can now only rely on two men, Aeschlimann and Weilenmann. The latter explains that the team is not seeking individual exploits and is adopting a "waiting strategy", saving themselves for the Alps where cooler temperatures should suit them better. La Liberté also underlines the "unlucky" race of the Swiss, although five of the eight riders managed to finish in the peloton.
Top three riders: Weilenmann, 9th at 2h10'31"; Diggelmann, 11th at 2h10'31"; Huber, 11th at 2h10'31"
Belgium (sports director: S. Maes): 11/12 riders still in the race • 2 stage wins • 2 yellow jerseys • Best team of the stage twice • 4 riders in top 10 overall.
Team ranking in Stage 3: 5th	In the Belgian newspaper Le Drapeau rouge, the report regrets the "misfortunes and bad luck" of the Belgians, explaining their inability to respond to the breakaway and the loss of the yellow jersey. Although the situation is not considered "catastrophic", it may affect team morale. In Le Soir, journalist Antoine Herbauts regrets that assisting riders such as Maurice Blomme, victim of multiple punctures, "ruined everything built between Brest and Le Mans", forcing potential attackers to wait.
Top three riders: Blomme, 11th at 2h10'31"; Close, 11th at 2h10'31"; Decock, 11th at 2h10'31"	In the Belgian newspaper Le Drapeau rouge, the report regrets the "misfortunes and bad luck" of the Belgians, explaining their inability to respond to the breakaway and the loss of the yellow jersey. Although the situation is not considered "catastrophic", it may affect team morale. In Le Soir, journalist Antoine Herbauts regrets that assisting riders such as Maurice Blomme, victim of multiple punctures, "ruined everything built between Brest and Le Mans", forcing potential attackers to wait.
Italy (sports director: A. Binda): 12/12 riders still in the race.
Team ranking in Stage 3: 3rd	In the Italian newspaper La Stampa, Vittorio Varale notes the success of the French "attack plan", which allowed them to win the stage, take the yellow jersey and gain time on Coppi and Bartali. He also observes that no coordinated Italian-Belgian counterattack was launched. In La Gazzetta dello Sport, Giuseppe Ambrosini also praised the French team's strong stage performance and the effort they put in, to which the Italians failed to respond. However, he regretted that Giovanni Corrieri, a member of the breakaway, was unable to see it through due to a puncture. Although he believed that the Italians “do not plan” to win before Nancy, a victory by Corrieri would have “helped boost team morale”, especially as it would not have been, in his view, “undeserved”.
Top three riders: Corrieri, 4th at 2h06'04"; Baroni, 10th at 2h10'31"; Bartali, 11th at 2h10'31"
France (sports director: M. Bidot): 11/12 riders still in the race • 1 stage win • 1 yellow jersey • Best team once • 2 riders in top 10 overall.
Team ranking in Stage 3: 1st	In ''L'Équipe'', journalist Albert de Wetter noted the complete success of the French team, highlighted by the fact that they surpassed the prize money previously won by the Belgians during the second stage. In ''L'Est Républicain'', journalist Jo Sauvage pointed out that this success was also made possible by the Belgians’ “downward spiral”, but that it rewarded a start to the Tour during which “the French riders” had constantly been on the attack.
Top three riders: Lauredi, 1st; Gauthier, 2nd at 2h00'00"; Bonnaventure, 11th at 2h10'31"	In ''L'Équipe'', journalist Albert de Wetter noted the complete success of the French team, highlighted by the fact that they surpassed the prize money previously won by the Belgians during the second stage. In ''L'Est Républicain'', journalist Jo Sauvage pointed out that this success was also made possible by the Belgians’ “downward spiral”, but that it rewarded a start to the Tour during which “the French riders” had constantly been on the attack.
Netherlands (sports director: K. Pellenaars): 8/8 riders still in the race • 1 rider in top 10 overall.
Team ranking in Stage 3: 2nd	In ''Les Sports de Belgique'', journalist Robert De Smet recalled Voorting’s strong performance, “hampered” by the misfortune of a crash involving Caput and Fachleitner. Without it, he would have had “a good chance of victory in a race where he was among the most enterprising riders.” According to De Smet, Voorting follows in the footsteps of Wim van Est, who took the yellow jersey in 1950 after a similar breakaway. In the Dutch newspaper ''Deventer'', journalists expressed satisfaction that the Dutch team’s hopes do not rest solely on van Est and Wout Wagtmans, as demonstrated by their 3rd place in the team general classification.
Top three riders: Voorting, 3rd at 2h03'25"; Faanhof, 7th at 2h10'31"; Dekkers, 11th at 2h10'31"
Spain (sports director: M. Cañardo): 7/8 riders still in the race.
Team ranking in Stage 3: 5th	In the Spanish newspaper ''Libertad'', Mariano Cañardo praised the solid performance of the Spanish team, which, unlike many others, avoided punctures and mechanical issues during the stage. He recalled that the collective objective is to finish in 1st place among the eight-man teams, (Note: At the end of this stage, they are in second place behind the Dutch team in this unofficial classification, but for the moment the approach adopted is rather focused on waiting and limiting the damage also caused by the intense heat. This strategy notably forces him to hold back Gil Solé on four or five occasions, who, strong and impetuous, wanted to attack without taking into account my orders to save himself for the mountains.) but that for now their approach is focused on waiting and limiting losses, also due to the intense heat. This strategy notably required him to “hold back Gil Solé on four or five occasions, as he, strong and impetuous, wanted to attack without regard for my instructions to conserve himself for the mountains.”
Top three riders: Gelabert, 11th at 2h10'31"; Gil Solé, 11th at 2h10'31"; Masip, 11th at 2h10'31"
Luxembourg (sports director: N. Frantz): 5/8 riders still in the race.
Team ranking in Stage 3: 5th	The Luxembourgish riders did not take part in the day’s breakaways and were generally spared the technical issues encountered by many other competitors. In ''L'Ardennais'', Nicolas Frantz simply summed up his team’s stage: “They are doing very well, especially at the table for now.”
Top three riders: Bintz, 11th at 2h10'31"; Diederich, 11th at 2h10'31"; Goedert, 11th at 2h10'31"	The Luxembourgish riders did not take part in the day’s breakaways and were generally spared the technical issues encountered by many other competitors. In ''L'Ardennais'', Nicolas Frantz simply summed up his team’s stage: “They are doing very well, especially at the table for now.”

== Results ==
=== Stage classifications ===
==== Individual stage classification ====
Nello Lauredi wins the stage ahead of his teammate Bernard Gauthier (France), who allows him the victory so he can claim the one-minute time bonus and secure the yellow jersey. After the crash that broke up the breakaway, Gerrit Voorting (Netherlands) is the first to get back on the road. He crosses the finish line in third place, more than three minutes behind. Two other delayed members of the breakaway then finish, more than six minutes behind: Giovanni Corrieri (Italy), who did not crash but was held back by a puncture, and Édouard Fachleitner (South-East). The peloton arrives more than ten minutes later, with the sprint won by Jacques Dupont (Paris). Fifteen riders are left behind, with Roger Rossinelli the last rider classified within the time limit, nearly twenty-two minutes behind the winner.

Individual classification of Stage 3
Rank	Rider	Nationality	Team	Time
1	Nello Lauredi	France	France	5:12:31
2	Bernard Gauthier	France	France	+0:00
3	Gerrit Voorting	Netherlands	Netherlands	+3:25
4	Giovanni Corrieri	Italy	Italy	+6:04
5	Édouard Fachleitner	France	South-East	+6:10
6	Jacques Dupont	France	Paris	+10:31
7	Henk Faanhof	Netherlands	Netherlands	+10:31
8	Jean Robic	France	France	+10:31
9	Gottfried Weilenmann	Switzerland	Switzerland	+10:31
10	Mario Baroni	Italy	Italy	+10:31

Stage podium

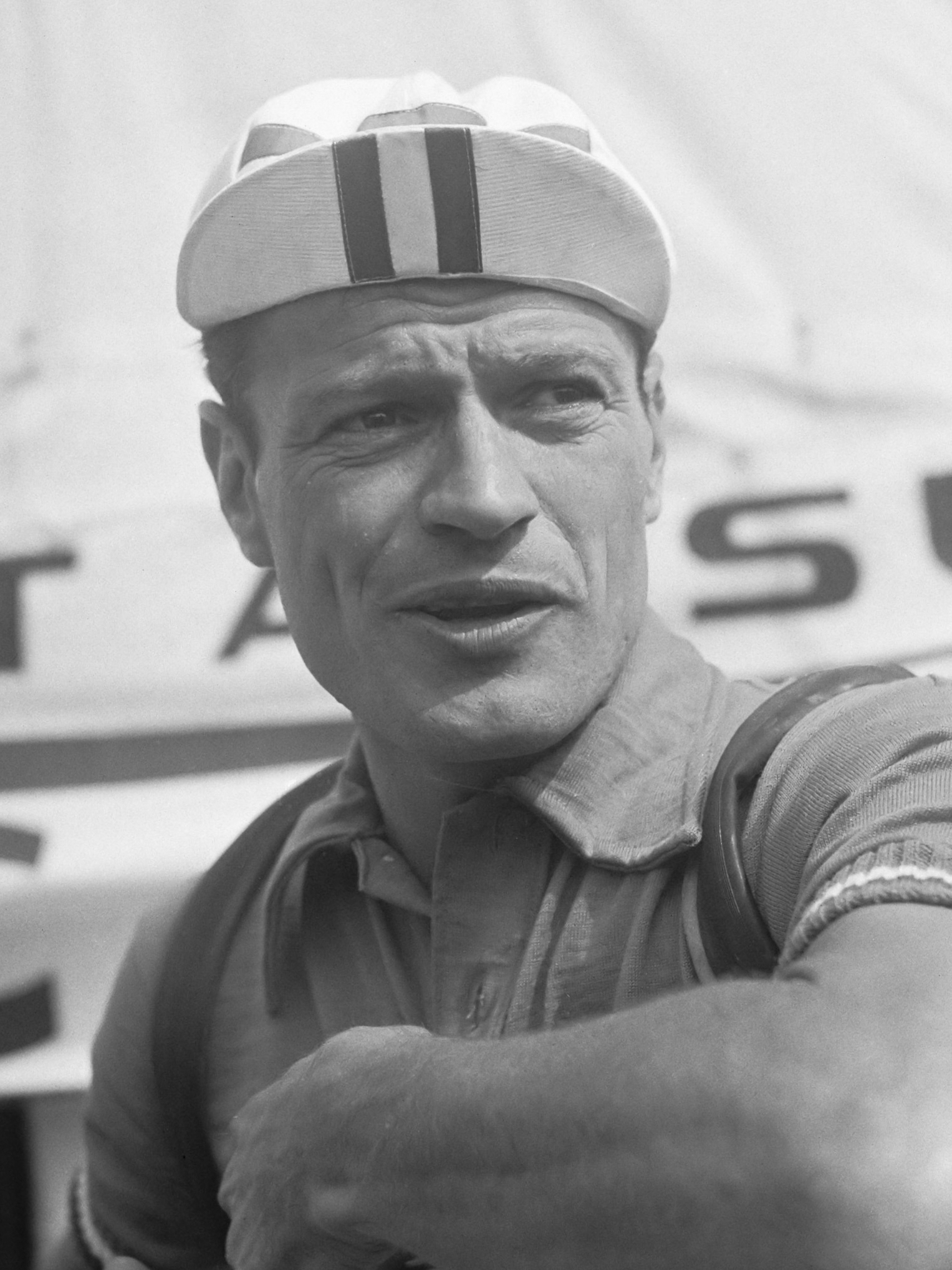
Nello Lauredi
(France team)
Stage winner

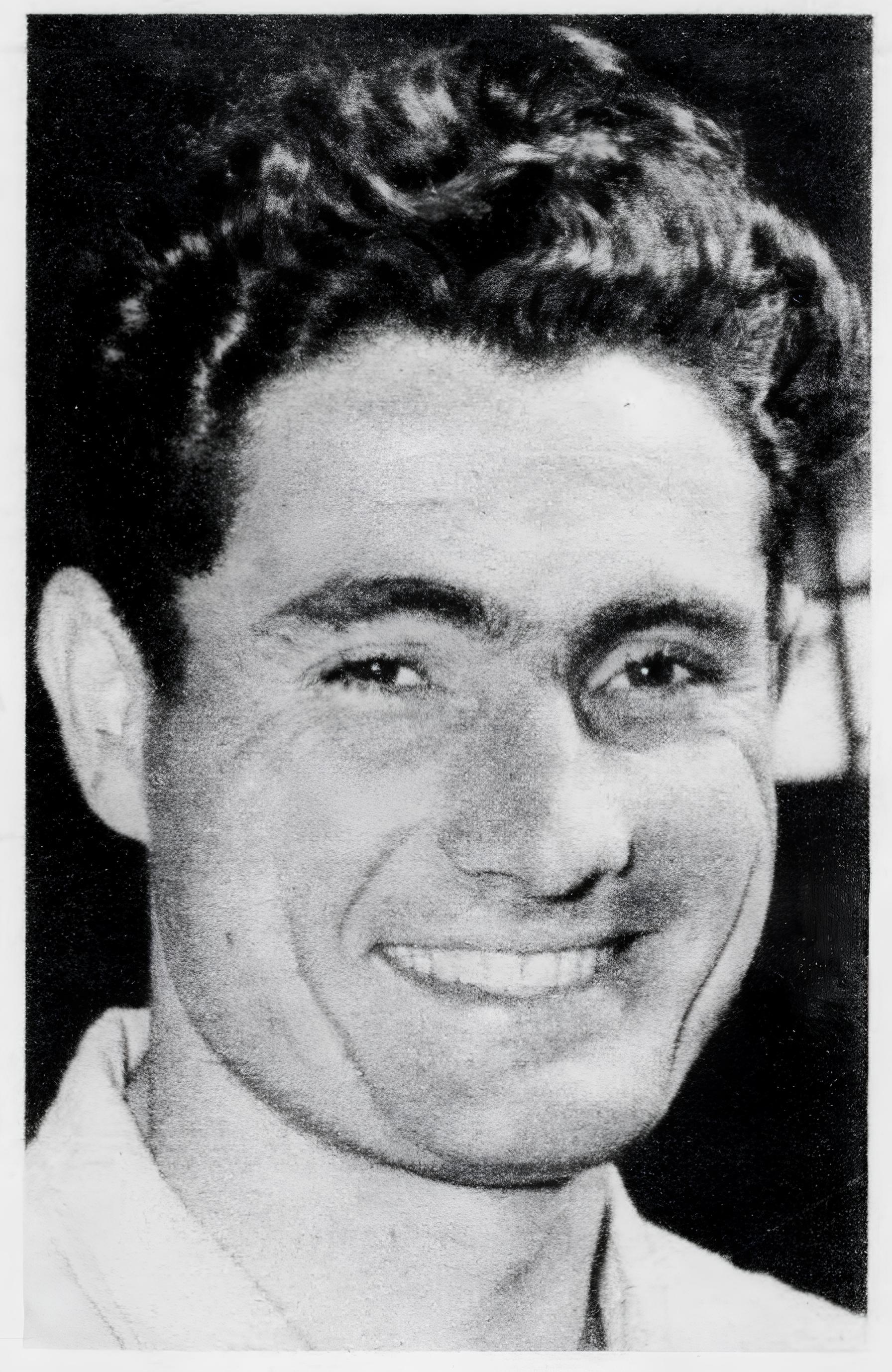
Bernard Gauthier
(France team)
Second place on the stage

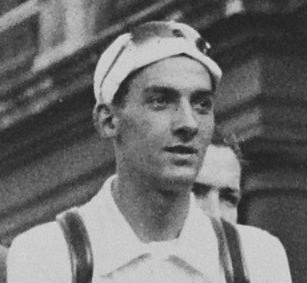
Gerrit Voorting
(Netherlands team)
Third place on the stage

==== Team classification for the stage ====
Thanks to the success of the two French riders, the French team comfortably won the team classification for the stage, with more than fifteen minutes’ advantage over the Dutch team. The South-East regional team was the best regional team of the stage.

Team classification of Stage 3
Rank	Team	Nationality	Time
1	France	France	15:46:34
2	Netherlands	Netherlands	+15:26
3	Italy	Italy	+18:05
4	South-East	France	+18:11
5	Belgium	Belgium	+22:32
6	Spain	Spain	+22:32
7	North-East / Centre	France	+22:32
8	West / South-West	France	+22:32
9	North Africa	France	+22:32
10	Paris	France	+22:32

=== Time bonuses ===
The regulations of the 1952 Tour de France award time bonuses to the first riders to cross categorized climbs and to those finishing first and second at the end of the stage. These seconds gained allow riders to take time off their rivals in the general classification of the race.

Time bonuses at the finish
Rank	Rider	Nationality	Team	Seconds
1	Nello Lauredi	France	France	1 min
2	Bernard Gauthier	France	France	30 s

=== Combativity award ===
- Nello Lauredi (France) receives five votes out of fourteen from the committee responsible for selecting the most combative rider of the stage.

=== Prizes awarded ===
A range of prizes and bonuses are awarded at the end of each stage, contributing to the prize pools of each Tour team. They are distributed by the organizer or by sponsors. The organizer deliberately chooses to create several categories of bonuses so that all types of riders, as well as teams—not only the stage winners—can be rewarded.

Breakdown of bonuses awarded at the end of Stage 3,
Category	Position	Recipient	Amount	Sponsor
Stage classification	1	Nello Lauredi	100,000 francs	Kleber-Colombes
Stage classification	2	Bernard Gauthier	50,000 francs	Kleber-Colombes
Stage classification	3	Gerrit Voorting	25,000 francs	Kleber-Colombes
Stage classification	4	Giovanni Corrieri	16,000 francs	Kleber-Colombes
Stage classification	5	Édouard Fachleitner	12,000 francs	Kleber-Colombes
Leading team of the day		France	100,000 francs	Martini
Best regional team of the day		North-East / Centre	50,000 francs	Martini
Yellow jersey holder		Nello Lauredi	100,000 francs	Suze
Most combative rider		Nello Lauredi	100,000 francs	Le Sucre
Unluckiest rider		Édouard Fachleitner	20,000 francs	Les Assurances
Cool-headedness award		Nello Lauredi and Bernard Gauthier	20,000 francs	Cynar
Due to inflation, the purchasing power of 100,000 old francs in 1952 is equivalent to €2,401.66 in 2022.

== Classifications after the stage ==
=== General classification ===
Lauredi and Gauthier (France) both make significant gains in the general classification, moving from 40th to 1st place and from 52nd to 2nd place respectively. Van Steenbergen loses the yellow jersey but remains in 3rd place. Voorting (Netherlands), who finished 3rd on the stage, also climbs the standings despite finishing three minutes behind the two French riders, moving from 52nd to 7th place. Fachleitner (South-East) also enters the top 10. Pardoën holds 4th place and remains the leading regional rider in the classification.

General classification after Stage 3
Rank	Rider	Nationality	Team	Time
1	Nello Lauredi	France	France	16:38:41
2	Bernard Gauthier	France	France	+3:43
3	Rik Van Steenbergen	Belgium	Belgium	+4:04
4	Pierre Pardoën	France	North-East / Centre	+5:04
5	Alex Close	Belgium	Belgium	+7:02
6	Édouard Fachleitner	France	South-East	+7:04
7	Gerrit Voorting	Netherlands	Netherlands	+7:38
8	Maurice Blomme	Belgium	Belgium	+7:53
9	Robert Vanderstockt	Belgium	Belgium	+7:58
10	Jean-Marie Cieleska	France	North-East / Centre	+8:12
11	Andrea Carrea	Italy	Italy	+8:12
12	André Rosseel	Belgium	Belgium	+9:15
13	Bernardo Ruiz	Spain	Spain	+9:45
14	Pierre Molinéris	France	South-East	+10:15
15	Giovanni Corrieri	Italy	Italy	+10:17

Mountains classification

No categorized climbs have yet been completed. Therefore, no rider is ranked in the mountains classification.

Team classification

The Belgian team loses 1st place to France, while the Netherlands remains in 3rd place, ahead of the North-East / Centre team, which remains the leading regional team but drops from 2nd to 5th place.

Team classification after Stage 3
Rank	Team	Nationality	Time
1	France	France	50:04:33
2	Belgium	Belgium	+4:46
3	Netherlands	Netherlands	+12:13
4	North-East / Centre	France	+16:11
5	Italy	Italy	+18:05
6	South-East	France	+19:30
7	West / South-West	France	+23:43
8	South-East	France	+19:05
9	Spain	Spain	+28:22
10	North Africa	France	+32:23

Leaders of the general classifications

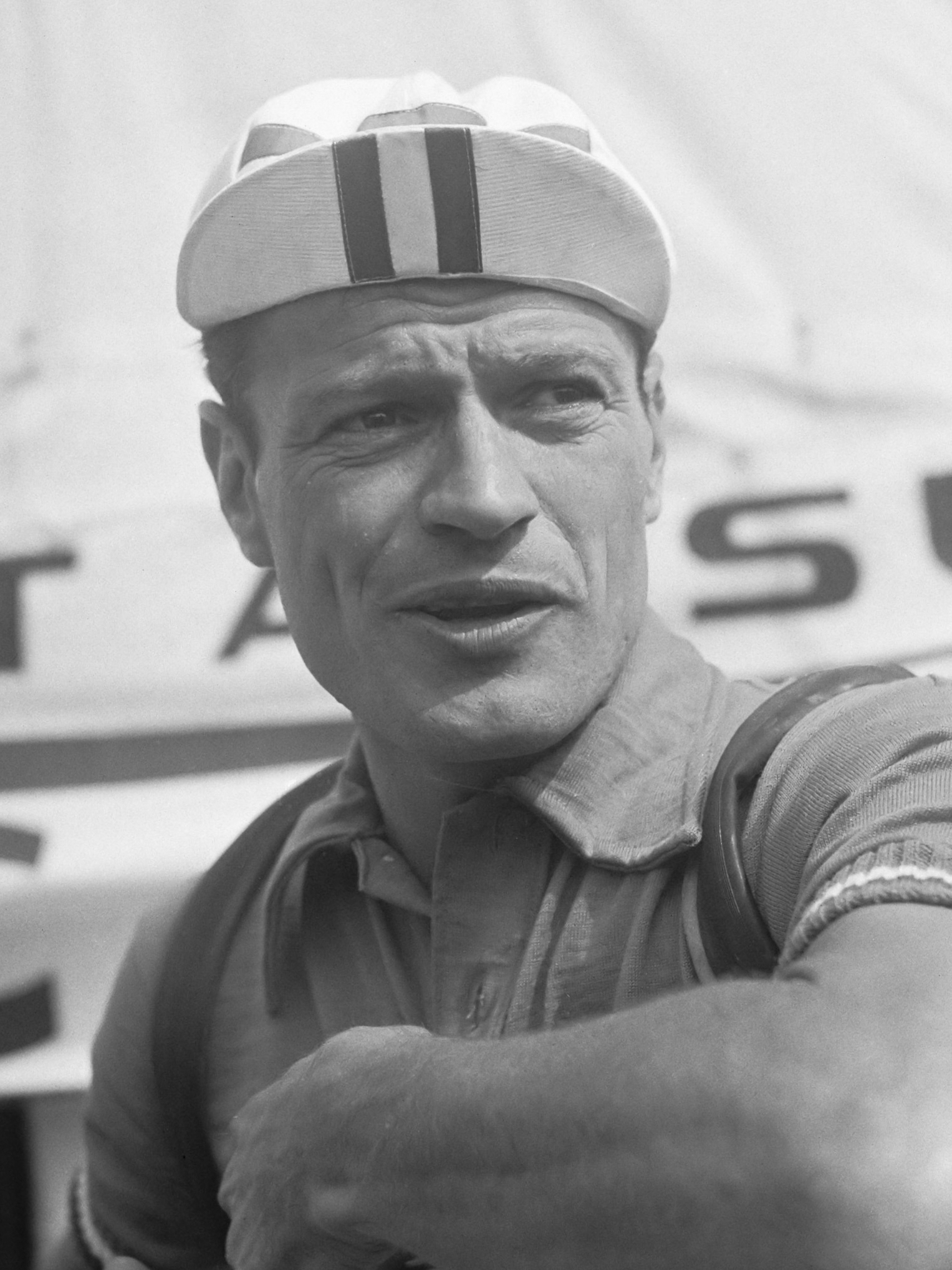
Nello Lauredi
(France)
Leader of the general classification

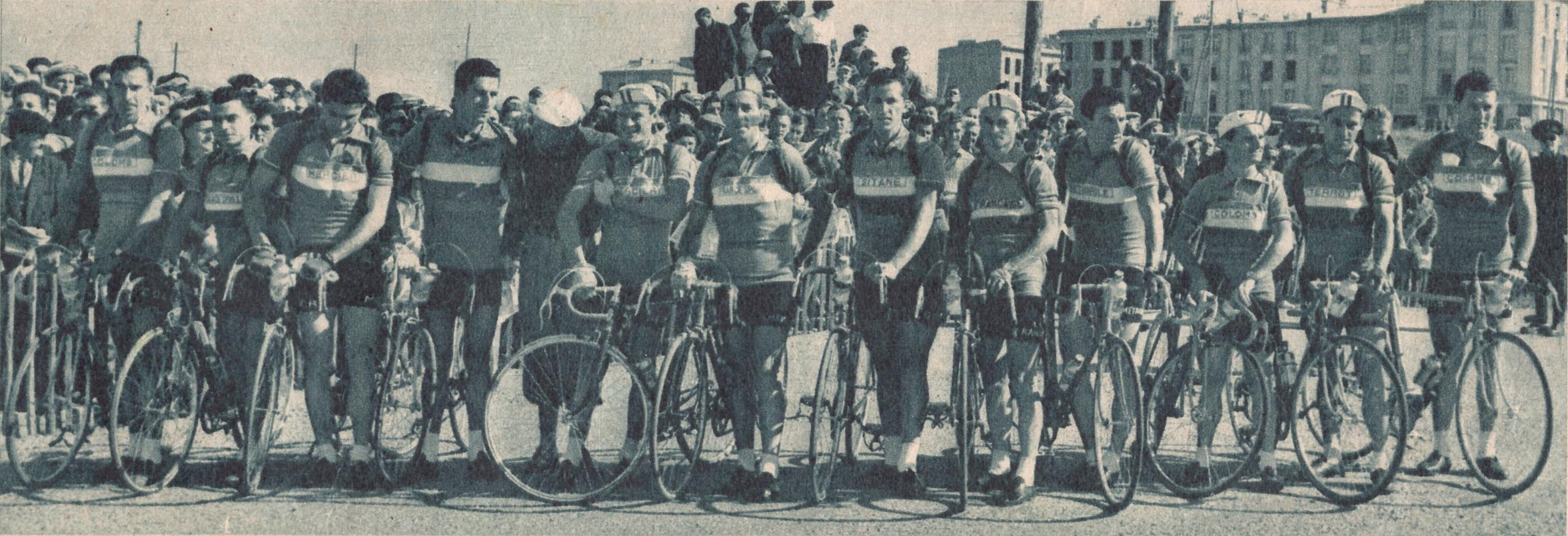
France
Leader of the team classification

== Withdrawals and exclusions ==
The list of riders classified at the finish of a stage is established by the Tour organizers by removing from the starting list those who withdrew during the stage (withdrawals), those who crossed the finish line with a time exceeding 10% of the winner’s time (outside the time limit), and those excluded for disciplinary reasons (disqualification).

=== Withdrawals ===
- France André Dufraisse (West / South-West).
- France Robert Ducard (North-East / Centre): suffering from two ingrown toenails that had been incised.
- Belgium Germain Derijcke (Belgium): suffering from glandular issues.
- France Robert Chapatte (Paris): suffering from indigestion.

== Statistics ==
The 3rd stage of the 1952 Tour de France represents, in the history of the Tour since 1903,

- the 713th stage held (including 75 half-stages);
- the 3rd stage victory in the career of Nello Lauredi;
- the 335th victory by a French rider;
- the first yellow jersey for the French team since that of Louison Bobet during the 1948 Tour de France, stage 13.

== Bibliography ==
- Augendre, Jacques (2023). Guide historique (PDF) (in French). Paris: Amaury Sport Organisation. p. 207.
- Cazeneuve, Thierry (2011). L'Équipe raconte la grande histoire du Tour de France 1947–1956 (in French). Vol. 2. Paris: L'Équipe / Cobra.
- Conord, Fabien (2014). Le Tour de France à l'heure nationale (in French). Paris: Presses Universitaires de France. p. 360. ISBN 9782130621669.
- 39th Tour de France 1952 (in French). Procyclingmaps. 13 June 2024.
- But-Club et le Miroir des sports (Sports magazine) (in French). 23 June 1952.
- But-Club et le Miroir des sports (Sports magazine) (in French). 30 June 1952.
- But-Club et le Miroir des sports (Sports magazine) (in French). 18 August 1952.
- Miroir Sprint (Sports magazine) (in French). 30 June 1952.
- Le Tour de France 1952 (Sports magazine) (in French). Paris.
