= Coulombiers =

Coulombiers may refer to the following places in France:

- Coulombiers, Sarthe, a commune in the Sarthe department
- Coulombiers, Vienne, a commune in the Vienne department
