= FYE (disambiguation) =

FYE is an American media retailer.

Fye or FYE may also refer to:

- Fyé, a commune in Pays-de-la-Loire, France
- Fayette County Airport (Tennessee), FAA LID of FYE
- The First Year Experience Program
- Fiscal year end
- W. Bruce Fye (born 1946), American physician
