= Neuville-près-Sées =

- Part of Chailloué
- Location of Neuville-près-Sées
- Location within France Location within Normandy
- Coordinates: 48°38′53″N 0°13′32″E
- Country: France
- Region: Normandy
- Department: Orne
- Arrondissement: Alençon
- Canton: Sées
- Commune: Chailloué
- Area^{1}: 14.74 km^{2} (5.69 sq mi)
- Elevation: 193 m (633 ft)
- Highest elevation: 227 m (745 ft)
- Lowest elevation: 175 m (574 ft)
- Population (2022): 155
  - Density: 10.5/km^{2} (27.2/sq mi)
- Time zone: UTC+01:00 (CET)
  - Summer (DST): UTC+02:00 (CEST)
- Postal code: 61500
- ^{1} French Land Register data, which excludes lakes, ponds, glaciers > 1 km^{2} (0.386 sq mi or 247 acres) and river estuaries.

Neuville-près-Sées (French pronunciation: [nøvil pʁɛ se], literally Neuville near Sées) is a former commune in the Orne department in north-western France. On 1 January 2016, it was merged into the commune of Chailloué.

== See also ==
- Communes of the Orne department
