= Fresnay-sur-Sarthe =

- Commune
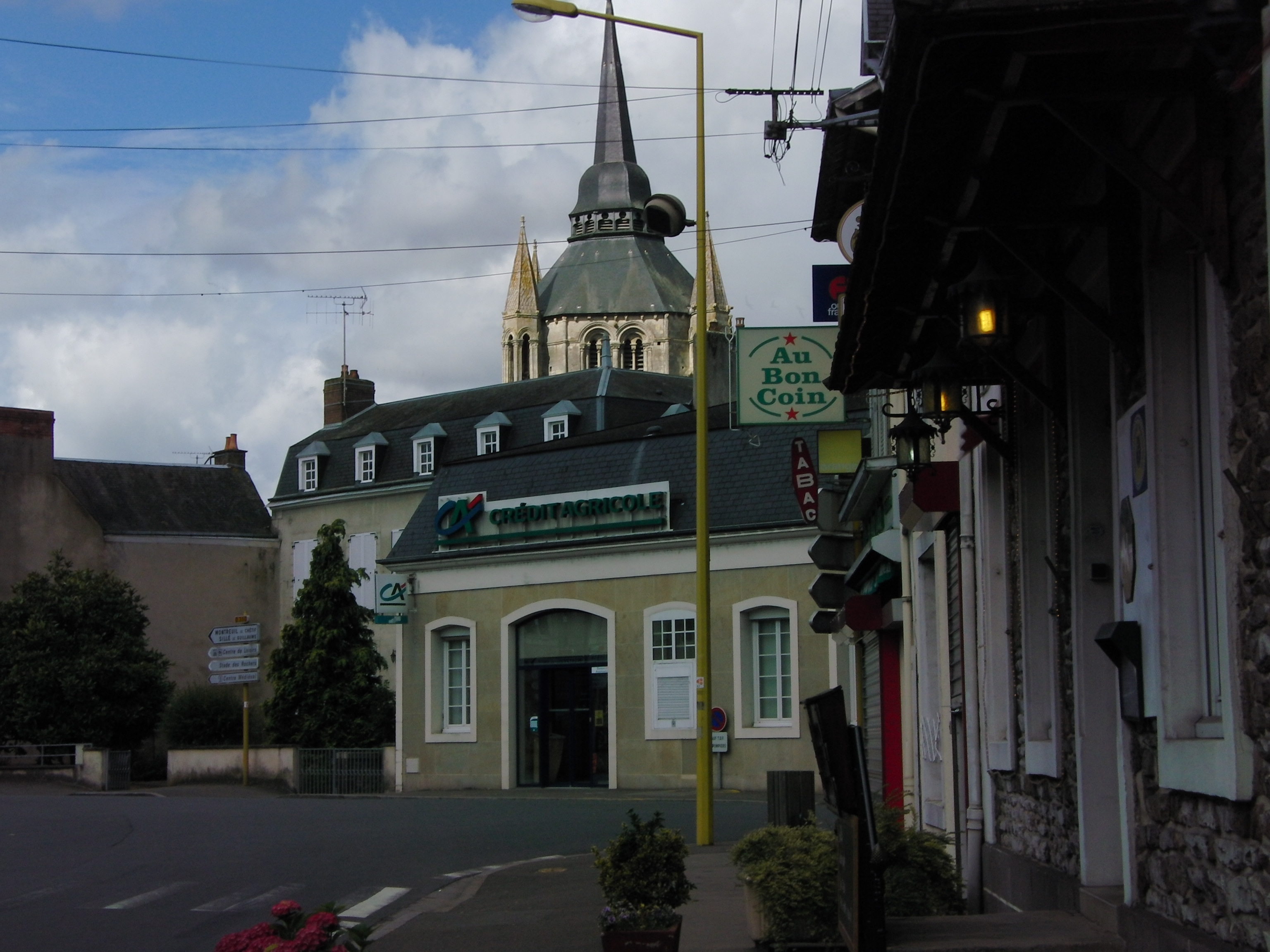
- The Avenue Charles de Gaulle, in Fresnay-sur-Sarthe

- Coat of arms
- Location of Fresnay-sur-Sarthe
- Location within France Location within Pays de la Loire
- Coordinates: 48°16′57″N 0°01′19″E
- Country: France
- Region: Pays de la Loire
- Department: Sarthe
- Arrondissement: Mamers
- Canton: Sillé-le-Guillaume
- Intercommunality: Haute Sarthe Alpes Mancelles
- Area^{1}: 29.20 km^{2} (11.27 sq mi)
- Highest elevation: 117 m (384 ft)
- Lowest elevation: 62 m (203 ft)
- Population (2023): 2,928
  - Density: 100.3/km^{2} (259.7/sq mi)
- Demonym: Fresnois
- Time zone: UTC+01:00 (CET)
  - Summer (DST): UTC+02:00 (CEST)
- INSEE/Postal code: 72138 /72130
- ^{1} French Land Register data, which excludes lakes, ponds, glaciers > 1 km^{2} (0.386 sq mi or 247 acres) and river estuaries.

Fresnay-sur-Sarthe (French pronunciation: [fʁɛnɛ syʁ saʁt], lit. 'Fresnay on Sarthe') is a commune in the Sarthe department in the region of Pays de la Loire in north-western France. On 1 January 2019, the former communes Coulombiers and Saint-Germain-sur-Sarthe were merged into Fresnay-sur-Sarthe. Fresnay-sur-Sarthe is the seat of the communauté de communes Haute Sarthe Alpes Mancelles, which covers 38 communes with a total population of about 23,000.

== History ==
It is thought that a small settlement was living on the banks of the River Sarthe during the Roman occupation. In the 7th century, around ten families were registered on the site, then called Faxinidum.

The history of Fresnay-sur-Sarthe begins with the building of the castle in around the 9th or 10 century, under the reign of Charles the Bald. Express mention can be found on an official document dated October 12, 997, in the first year of the reign of Robert the Pious. The main purpose of the castle was protect those crossing the river.

William the Conqueror captured the castle twice; first in 1063, and then again in 1073. Young Robert of Bellême, who played an important role during the siege, was knighted by William the Conqueror.

In 1100, Henry I decided to join the Maine to the Anjou. The castle became one of several designated to protect the Maine against "North Mans" (Vikings)'s attacks, and the city was placed under the protection of the Vicomte de Beaumont. At the time, the village was called Fresnay-le-Vicomte. A few more attacks were launched against Fresnay, and the city only found peace at the beginning of the 14th century. It was during this period that farming developed in that area.

The strategic importance of the Castle of Fresnay was particularly highlighted during the Hundred Years' War. The castle was successively occupied by the adventurers of Philippe de la Chèze in 1356, and then captured by the English troops of King Henry V in 1417. It returned to French rule due to Ambroise de Loré (future companion of Joan of Arc). He became Captain of the Castle in 1418, and later became "Prévôt" de Paris.

In 1420, the city was again taken by the English who occupied the place for thirty years (1420 to 1450). Heavily affected by the Hundred Years' War, Fresnay also suffered the Wars of Religion; in 1562, it was devastated by the Huguenots. Since then, the castle has gradually fallen into disrepair.

From the beginning of 17th century to the end of the 19th century, the culture of hemp grew in importance; that textile was especially used for ships' sails. New quarters were created in Fresnay's area; the "Bourg-Neuf" and the "Creusot". Some weavers' houses, from that time, remain visible today. In 1793, the old wooden bridge was replaced by one made of stone.

During the 20th century, the weaving workshops of Fresnay were replaced by agronomics and domestic appliance industries.

== Population ==
Population data refer to the area corresponding with the commune as of January 2025.

Historical population
Year	Pop.	±% p.a.
1968	3,378	—
1975	3,533	+0.64%
1982	3,478	−0.22%
1990	3,249	−0.85%
1999	3,120	−0.45%
2007	3,138	+0.07%
2012	3,112	−0.17%
2017	2,970	−0.93%
2023	2,928	−0.24%
Source: INSEE

== Twin Towns ==
- Spilsby, United Kingdom
- Bassum, Germany

== See also ==
- Communes of the Sarthe department
