= Broglie, Eure =

Broglie
- Commune
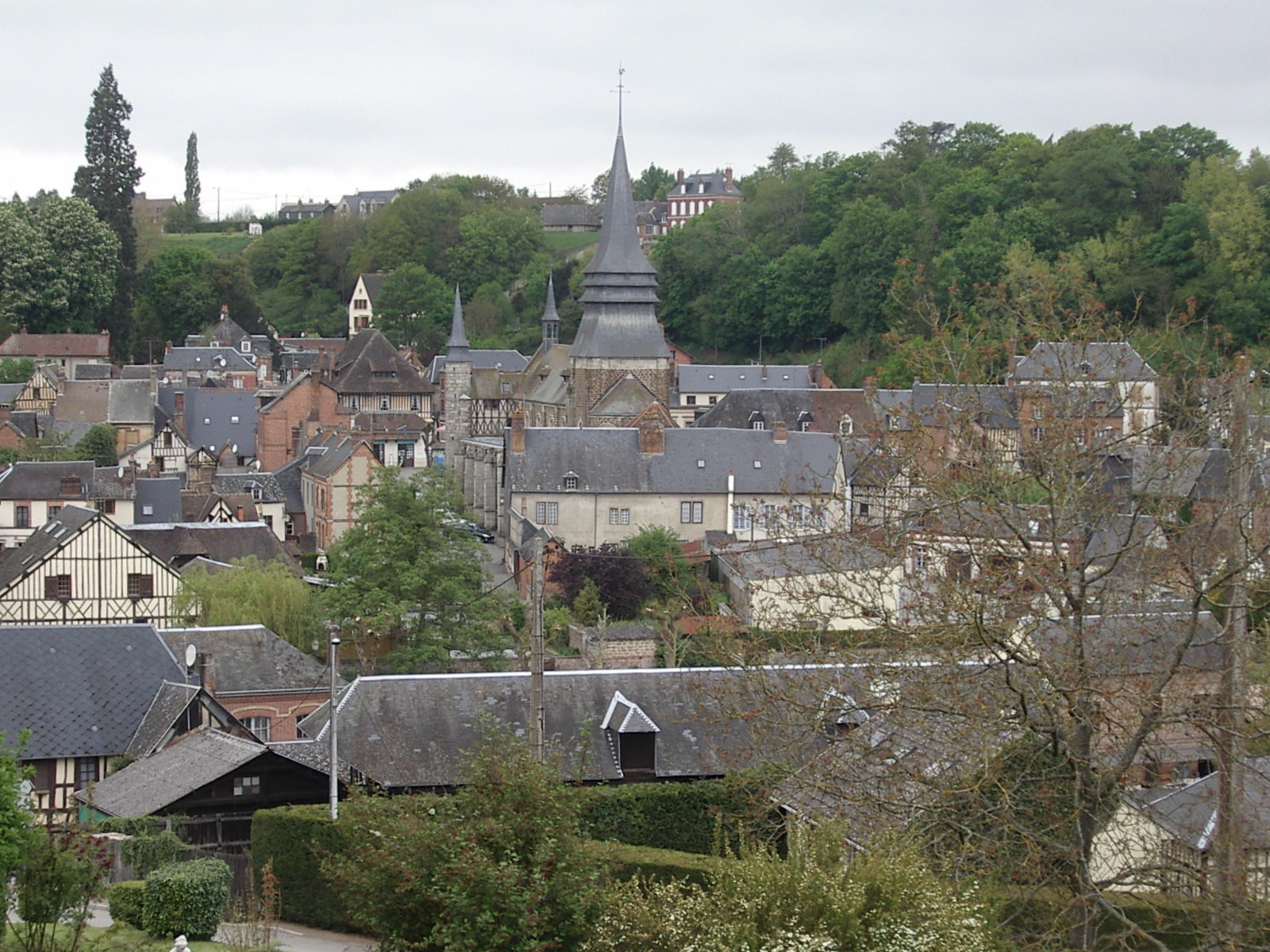
- The church and surroundings in Broglie

- Coat of arms
- Location of Broglie
- Location within France Location within Normandy
- Coordinates: 49°00′34″N 0°31′49″E
- Country: France
- Region: Normandy
- Department: Eure
- Arrondissement: Bernay
- Canton: Breteuil

Government
  - Mayor (2020–2026): Roger Bonneville
- Area^{1}: 7.96 km^{2} (3.07 sq mi)
- Elevation: 142 m (466 ft)
- Highest elevation: 197 m (646 ft)
- Lowest elevation: 132 m (433 ft)
- Population (2023): 1,056
  - Density: 133/km^{2} (344/sq mi)
- Time zone: UTC+01:00 (CET)
  - Summer (DST): UTC+02:00 (CEST)
- INSEE/Postal code: 27117 /27270
- ^{1} French Land Register data, which excludes lakes, ponds, glaciers > 1 km^{2} (0.386 sq mi or 247 acres) and river estuaries.

Broglie (French pronunciation: [bʁɔɡli]) is a commune in the Eure department in Normandy in northern France.

== Geography ==
The commune along with another 69 communes shares part of a 4,747 hectare, Natura 2000 conservation area, called Risle, Guiel, Charentonne.

== Population ==
Historical population
Year	Pop.	±% p.a.
1968	1,051	—
1975	1,132	+1.07%
1982	1,126	−0.08%
1990	1,168	+0.46%
1999	1,105	−0.61%
2007	1,113	+0.09%
2012	1,097	−0.29%
2017	1,057	−0.74%
2023	1,056	−0.02%
Source: INSEE

== Notable people ==
- Augustin-Jean Fresnel (1788–1827), physicist, was born in Broglie

== See also ==
- Communes of the Eure department
- House of Broglie
