= Coulombiers, Sarthe =

Coulombiers
- Part of Fresnay-sur-Sarthe
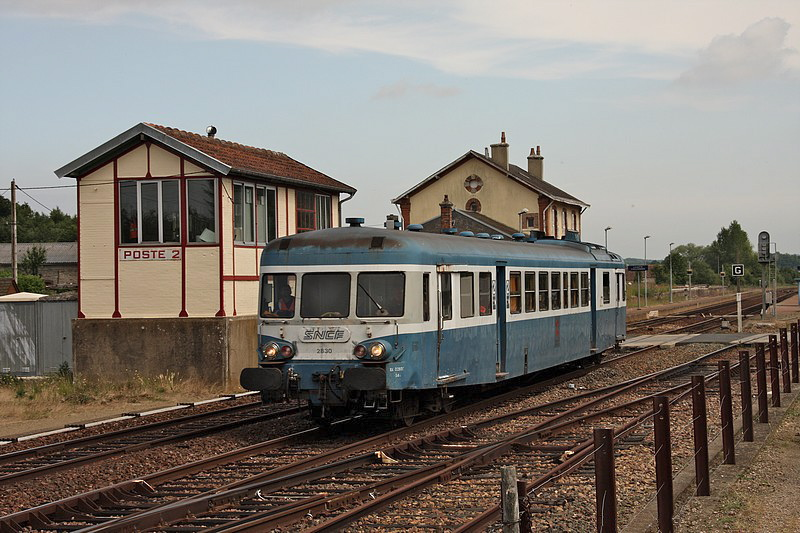
- La Hutte - Coulombiers railway station
- Location of Coulombiers
- Location within France Location within Pays de la Loire
- Coordinates: 48°17′52″N 0°07′35″E
- Country: France
- Region: Pays de la Loire
- Department: Sarthe
- Arrondissement: Mamers
- Canton: Sillé-le-Guillaume
- Commune: Fresnay-sur-Sarthe
- Area^{1}: 12.34 km^{2} (4.76 sq mi)
- Highest elevation: 116 m (381 ft)
- Lowest elevation: 70 m (230 ft)
- Population (2022): 445
  - Density: 36.1/km^{2} (93.4/sq mi)
- Demonym: Colombéens
- Time zone: UTC+01:00 (CET)
  - Summer (DST): UTC+02:00 (CEST)
- Postal code: 72130
- ^{1} French Land Register data, which excludes lakes, ponds, glaciers > 1 km^{2} (0.386 sq mi or 247 acres) and river estuaries.

Coulombiers (French pronunciation: [kulɔ̃bje]) is a former commune in the Sarthe department in the Pays de la Loire region in north-western France. On 1 January 2019, it was merged into the commune Fresnay-sur-Sarthe.

== See also ==
- Communes of the Sarthe department
