= Marmouillé =

- Part of Chailloué
- Location of Marmouillé
- Location within France Location within Normandy
- Coordinates: 48°40′27″N 0°12′11″E
- Country: France
- Region: Normandy
- Department: Orne
- Arrondissement: Alençon
- Canton: Sées
- Commune: Chailloué
- Area^{1}: 9.53 km^{2} (3.68 sq mi)
- Elevation: 186 m (610 ft)
- Highest elevation: 252 m (827 ft)
- Lowest elevation: 165 m (541 ft)
- Population (2022): 123
  - Density: 12.9/km^{2} (33.4/sq mi)
- Time zone: UTC+01:00 (CET)
  - Summer (DST): UTC+02:00 (CEST)
- Postal code: 61240
- ^{1} French Land Register data, which excludes lakes, ponds, glaciers > 1 km^{2} (0.386 sq mi or 247 acres) and river estuaries.

Marmouillé (French pronunciation: [maʁmuje]) is a former commune in the Orne department in north-western France. On 1 January 2016, it was merged into the commune of Chailloué.

== See also ==
- Communes of the Orne department
