= Chailloué =

- Commune
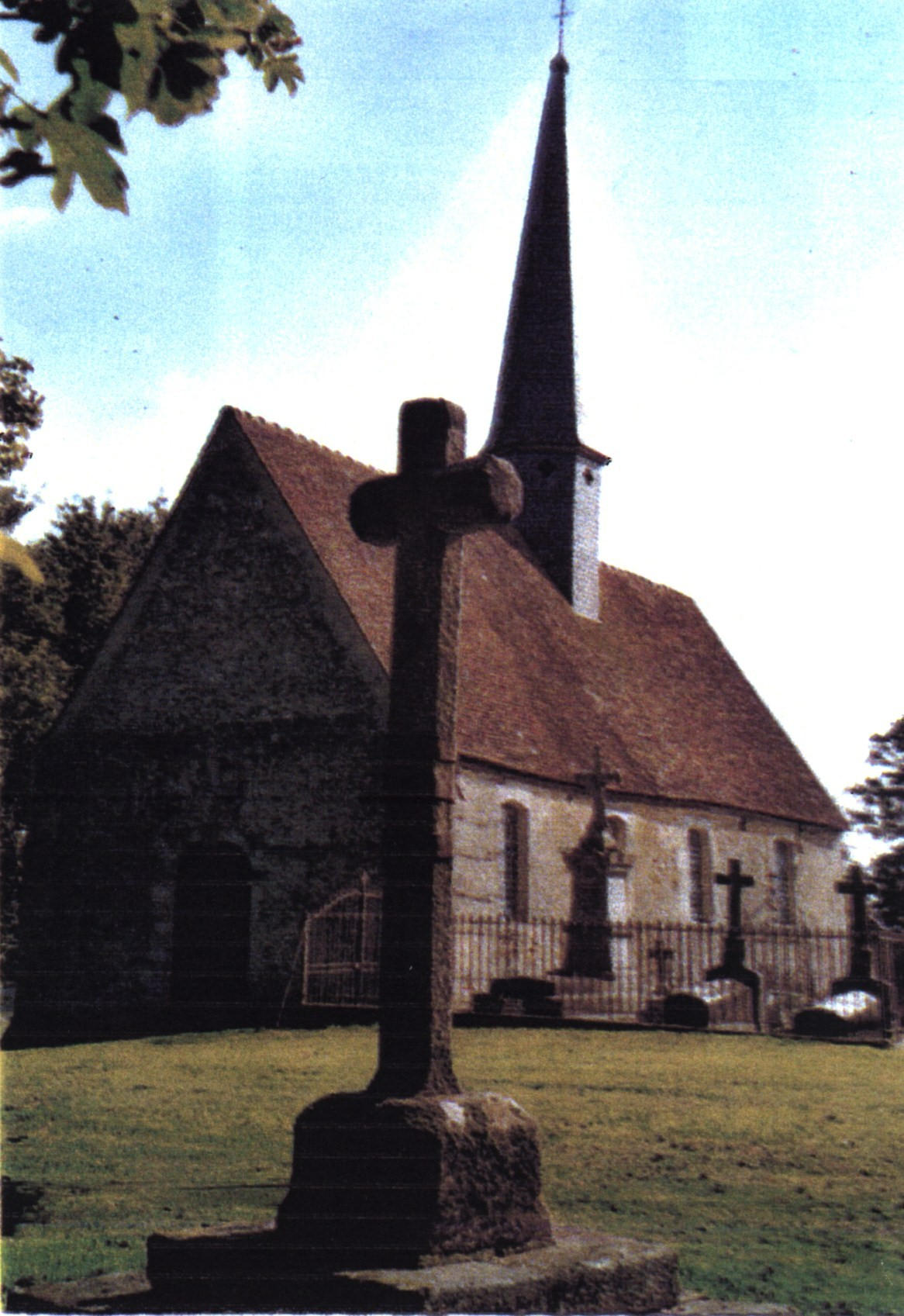
- The church of Saint-Paterne of Montrond
- Location of Chailloué
- Location within France Location within Normandy
- Coordinates: 48°39′09″N 0°11′54″E
- Country: France
- Region: Normandy
- Department: Orne
- Arrondissement: Alençon
- Canton: Sées

Government
  - Mayor (2020–2026): Christian Leloup
- Area^{1}: 35.88 km^{2} (13.85 sq mi)
- Elevation: 175 m (574 ft)
- Highest elevation: 223 m (732 ft)
- Lowest elevation: 167 m (548 ft)
- Population (2023): 890
  - Density: 25/km^{2} (64/sq mi)
- Demonym: Cailloutins
- Time zone: UTC+01:00 (CET)
  - Summer (DST): UTC+02:00 (CEST)
- INSEE/Postal code: 61081 /61500
- ^{1} French Land Register data, which excludes lakes, ponds, glaciers > 1 km^{2} (0.386 sq mi or 247 acres) and river estuaries.

Chailloué (French pronunciation: [ʃajwe]) is a commune in the Orne department in north-western France. On 1 January 2016, the former communes Marmouillé and Neuville-près-Sées were merged into Chailloué.

== Geography ==
The commune of is made up of the following villages and hamlets, La Dufrênerie, Marmouillé, Champ Bourdin, Bois Chassevent, Neuville-près-Sées, La Dultière and Chailloué.

Chailloué along with another 65 communes is part of a 20,593 hectare, Natura 2000 conservation area, called the Haute vallée de l'Orne et affluents.

Chailloués has two rivers, The Don & La Senelle and a stream the Monts Damain.

== Notable buildings and places ==
- Rustik is an immersive amusement park, set in a medieval-fantasy kingdom, which opened in 2020.

=== National heritage sites ===
The Commune has 2 buildings and areas listed as a Monument historique.

- Château a 17th-century castle built by the Vieupont family, and registered as a monument historique in 2010.
- Former church of Saint-Pierre Saint-Jean and Saint-Paterne de Montrond a 14th-century former church, classed as a monument historique in 1979.

== Transport ==
- Aire de Les Sources de l'Orne is a stop off area on the A28 autoroute.

== See also ==
- Communes of the Orne department
