= Saint-Evroult-de-Montfort =

- Commune
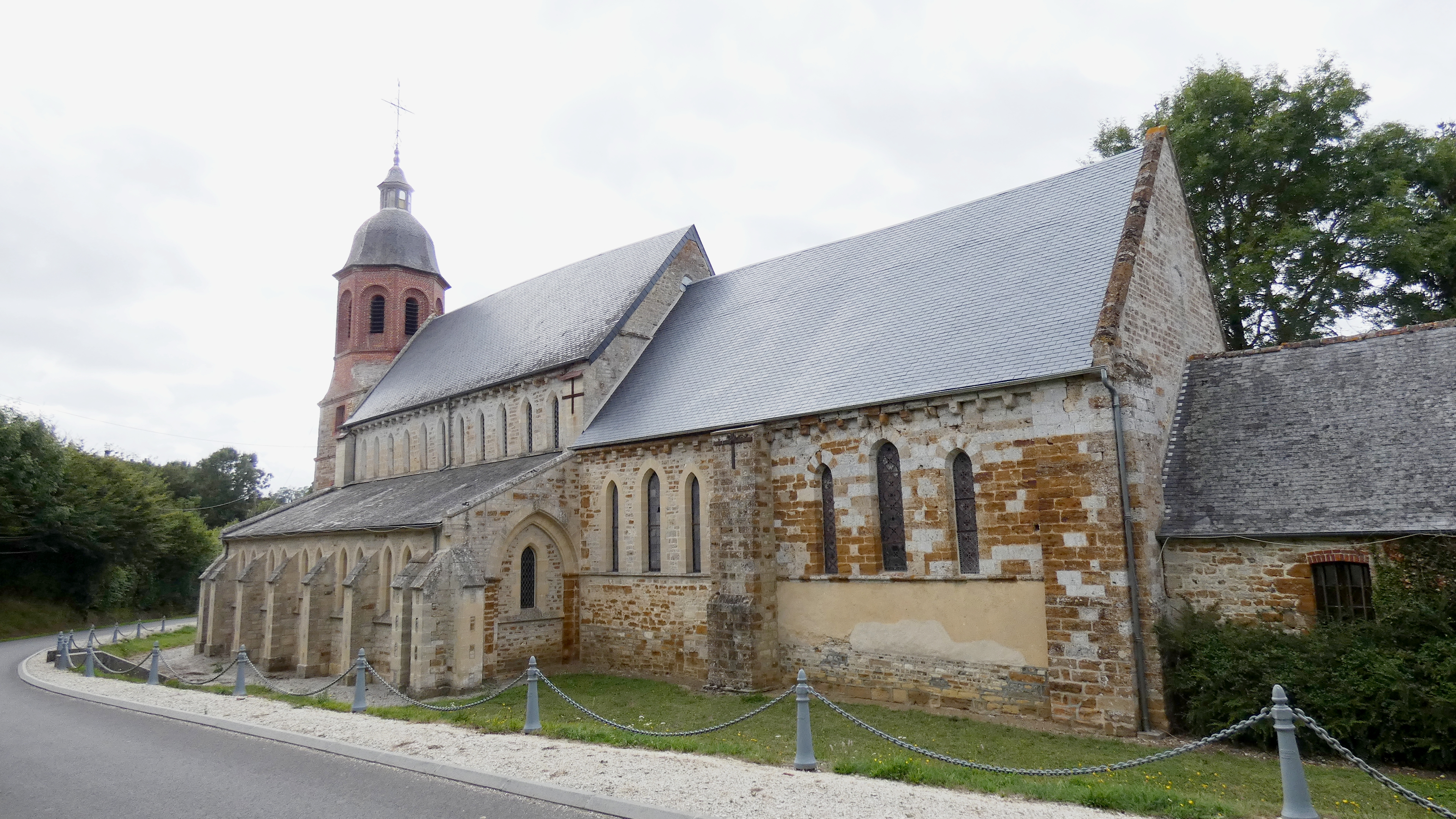
- Location of Saint-Evroult-de-Montfort
- Location within France Location within Normandy
- Coordinates: 48°48′33″N 0°18′38″E
- Country: France
- Region: Normandy
- Department: Orne
- Arrondissement: Mortagne-au-Perche
- Canton: Vimoutiers

Government
  - Mayor (2020–2026): Karine Chevalier
- Area^{1}: 22.36 km^{2} (8.63 sq mi)
- Elevation: 213 m (699 ft)
- Highest elevation: 318 m (1,043 ft)
- Lowest elevation: 172 m (564 ft)
- Population (2023): 370
  - Density: 17/km^{2} (43/sq mi)
- Time zone: UTC+01:00 (CET)
  - Summer (DST): UTC+02:00 (CEST)
- INSEE/Postal code: 61385 /61230
- ^{1} French Land Register data, which excludes lakes, ponds, glaciers > 1 km^{2} (0.386 sq mi or 247 acres) and river estuaries.

Saint-Evroult-de-Montfort (French pronunciation: [sɛ̃.t‿evʁu də mɔ̃fɔʁ]) is a commune in the Orne department in north-western France.

== Geography ==
The commune is made up of the following collection of villages and hamlets, Les Hayes and Saint-Evroult-de-Montfort.

The Commune is one of 27 communes that make up the Natura 2000 protected area of Bocages et vergers du sud Pays d'Auge.

The commune along with another 69 communes shares part of a 4,747 hectare, Natura 2000 conservation area, called Risle, Guiel, Charentonne.

The commune has a river, The Touques and two streams, the Chaumont & douy flowing through the commune.

== See also ==
- Communes of the Orne department
