= Piacé =

- Commune
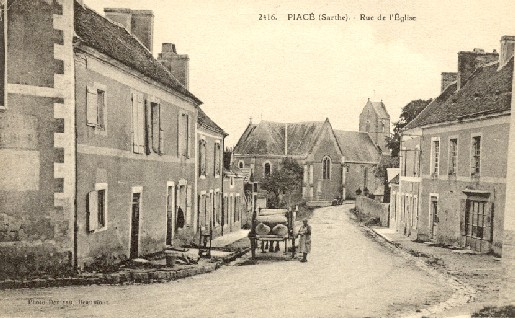
- An old view of Piacé
- Location of Piacé
- Location within France Location within Pays de la Loire
- Coordinates: 48°15′36″N 0°06′54″E
- Country: France
- Region: Pays de la Loire
- Department: Sarthe
- Arrondissement: Mamers
- Canton: Sillé-le-Guillaume
- Intercommunality: Haute Sarthe Alpes Mancelles

Government
  - Mayor (2020–2026): Frédéric Denieul
- Area^{1}: 10.12 km^{2} (3.91 sq mi)
- Highest elevation: 114 m (374 ft)
- Lowest elevation: 62 m (203 ft)
- Population (2023): 370
  - Density: 37/km^{2} (95/sq mi)
- Time zone: UTC+01:00 (CET)
  - Summer (DST): UTC+02:00 (CEST)
- INSEE/Postal code: 72235 /72170
- ^{1} French Land Register data, which excludes lakes, ponds, glaciers > 1 km^{2} (0.386 sq mi or 247 acres) and river estuaries.

Piacé (French pronunciation: [pjase]) is a commune in the Sarthe department in the region of Pays de la Loire in north-western France.

== See also ==
- Communes of the Sarthe department
