= Saint-Germain-sur-Sarthe =

- Part of Fresnay-sur-Sarthe
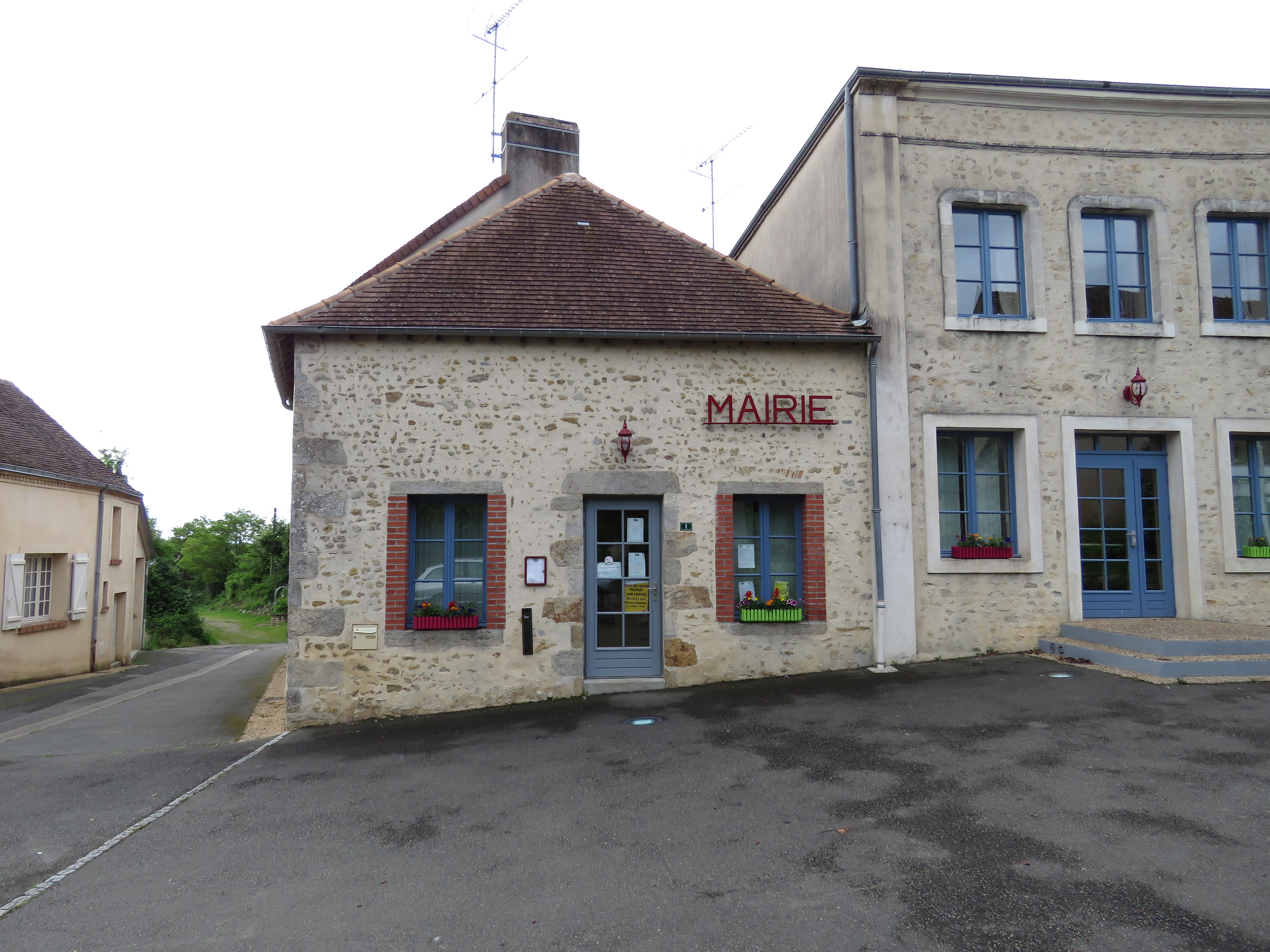
- The town hall of Saint-Germain-sur-Sarthe
- Location of Saint-Germain-sur-Sarthe
- Location within France Location within Pays de la Loire
- Coordinates: 48°17′09″N 0°05′45″E
- Country: France
- Region: Pays de la Loire
- Department: Sarthe
- Arrondissement: Mamers
- Canton: Sillé-le-Guillaume
- Commune: Fresnay-sur-Sarthe
- Area^{1}: 14.76 km^{2} (5.70 sq mi)
- Highest elevation: 103 m (338 ft)
- Lowest elevation: 62 m (203 ft)
- Population (2022): 518
  - Density: 35.1/km^{2} (90.9/sq mi)
- Demonym(s): Saint-Germinois, Saint-Germinoise
- Time zone: UTC+01:00 (CET)
  - Summer (DST): UTC+02:00 (CEST)
- Postal code: 72130
- ^{1} French Land Register data, which excludes lakes, ponds, glaciers > 1 km^{2} (0.386 sq mi or 247 acres) and river estuaries.

Saint-Germain-sur-Sarthe (French pronunciation: [sɛ̃ ʒɛʁmɛ̃ syʁ saʁt], lit. 'Saint Germain on Sarthe') is a former commune in the Sarthe department in the region of Pays de la Loire in north-western France. On 1 January 2019, it was merged into the commune Fresnay-sur-Sarthe.

== See also ==
- Communes of the Sarthe department
