= Bosrobert =

- Commune
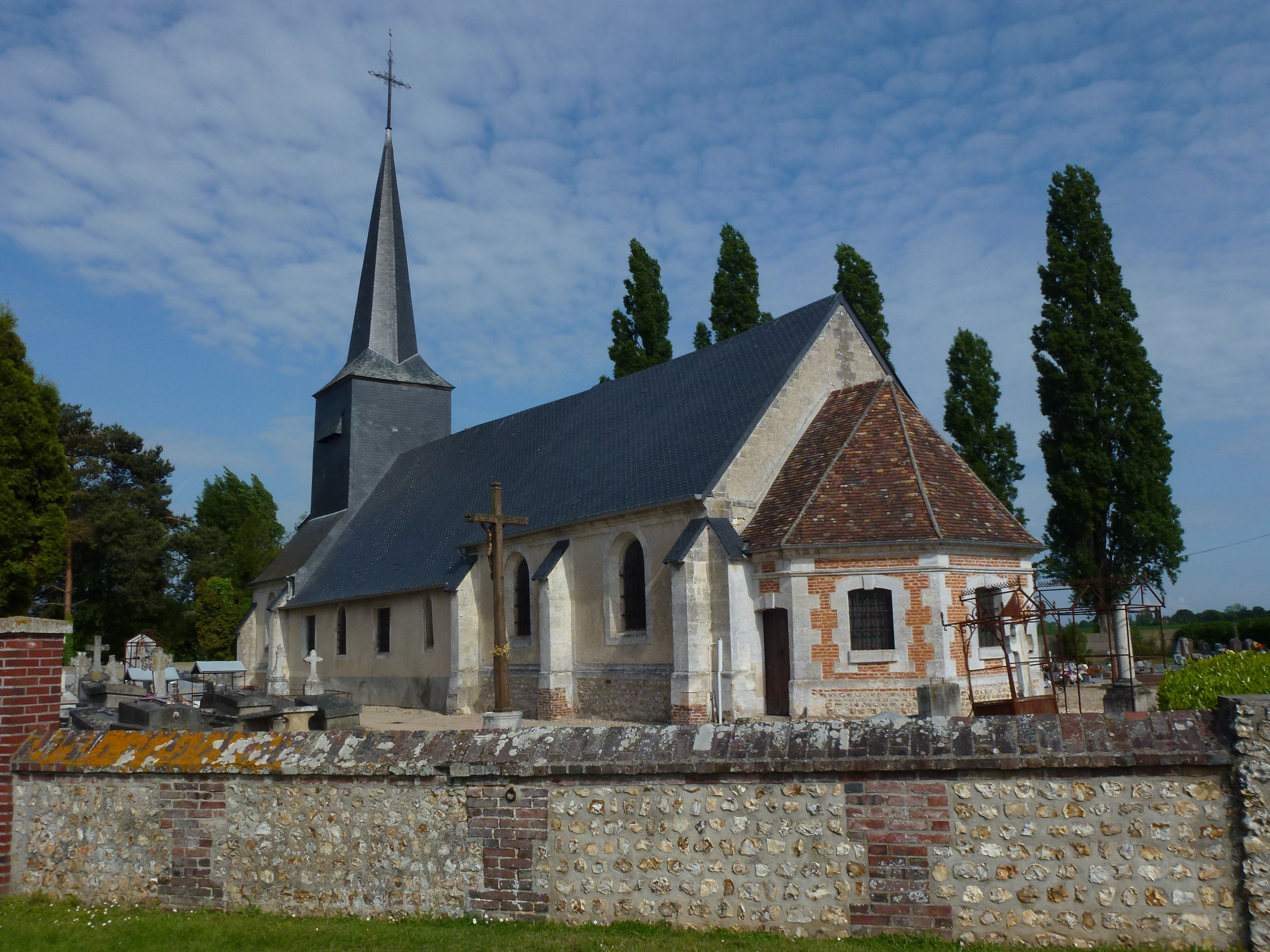
- The church in Bosrobert
- Location of Bosrobert
- Location within France Location within Normandy
- Coordinates: 49°13′33″N 0°45′18″E
- Country: France
- Region: Normandy
- Department: Eure
- Arrondissement: Bernay
- Canton: Brionne
- Intercommunality: Bernay Terres de Normandie

Government
  - Mayor (2024–2026): Jérôme Breemeersch
- Area^{1}: 9.21 km^{2} (3.56 sq mi)
- Elevation: 140 m (460 ft)
- Highest elevation: 150 m (490 ft)
- Lowest elevation: 56 m (184 ft)
- Population (2023): 668
  - Density: 72.5/km^{2} (188/sq mi)
- Time zone: UTC+01:00 (CET)
  - Summer (DST): UTC+02:00 (CEST)
- INSEE/Postal code: 27095 /27800
- ^{1} French Land Register data, which excludes lakes, ponds, glaciers > 1 km^{2} (0.386 sq mi or 247 acres) and river estuaries.

Bosrobert (French pronunciation: [boʁɔbɛʁ]) is a commune in the Eure department in Normandy in northern France.

== Geography ==
The commune along with another 69 communes shares part of a 4,747 hectare, Natura 2000 conservation area, called Risle, Guiel, Charentonne.

== Population ==
Historical population
Year	Pop.	±% p.a.
1968	212	—
1975	229	+1.11%
1982	342	+5.90%
1990	354	+0.43%
1999	374	+0.61%
2007	440	+2.05%
2012	609	+6.72%
2017	664	+1.74%
2023	668	+0.10%
Source: INSEE

== See also ==
- Communes of the Eure department
