= Fyé =

- Commune
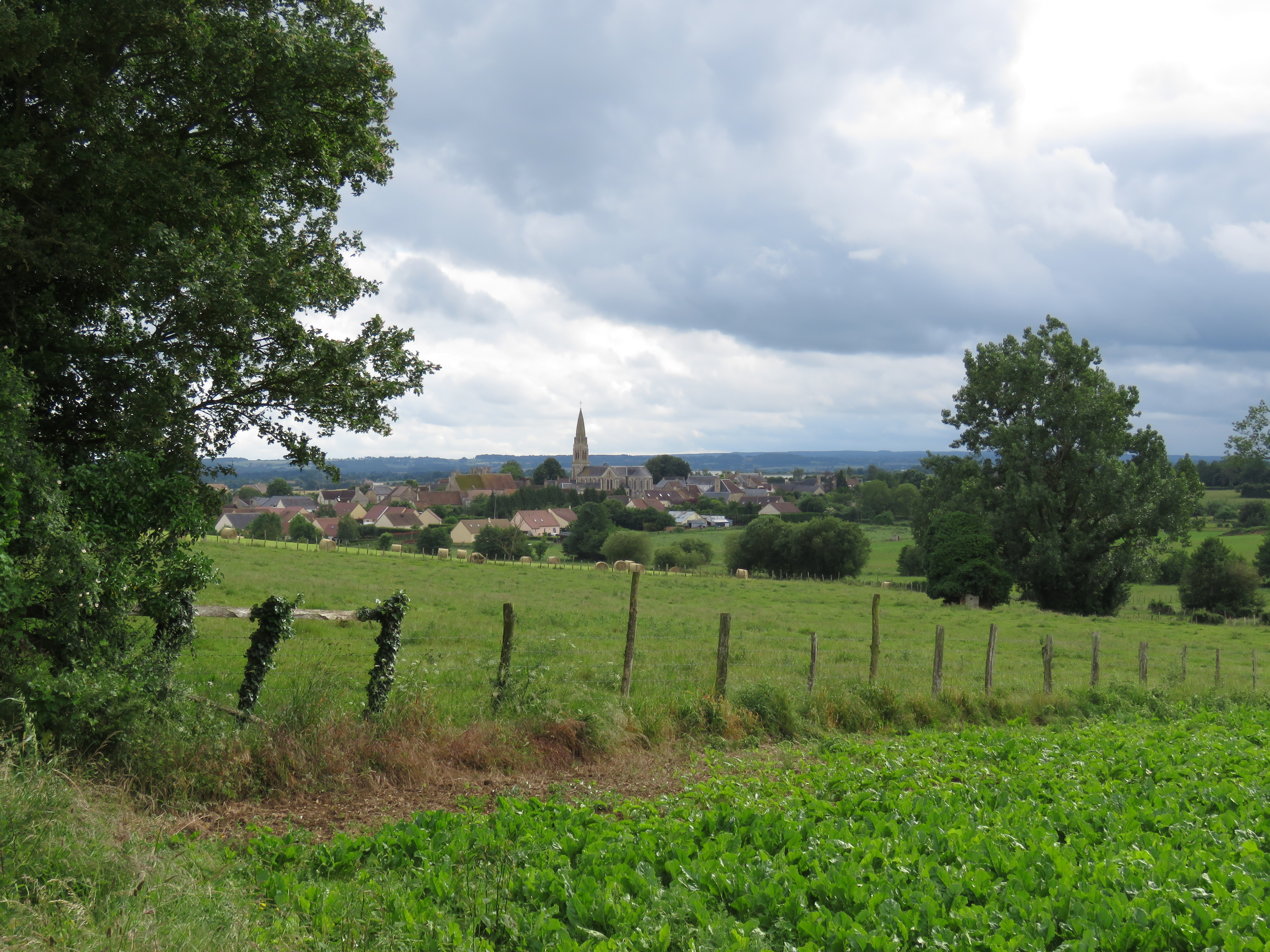
- A view of the village from the north

- Coat of arms
- Location of Fyé
- Location within France Location within Pays de la Loire
- Coordinates: 48°19′36″N 0°04′44″E
- Country: France
- Region: Pays de la Loire
- Department: Sarthe
- Arrondissement: Mamers
- Canton: Sillé-le-Guillaume
- Intercommunality: Haute Sarthe Alpes Mancelles

Government
  - Mayor (2020–2026): Jean-Pierre Frimont
- Area^{1}: 16.40 km^{2} (6.33 sq mi)
- Highest elevation: 152 m (499 ft)
- Lowest elevation: 73 m (240 ft)
- Population (2023): 1,013
  - Density: 61.77/km^{2} (160.0/sq mi)
- Demonym: Flacuméens ou Fiétuméens
- Time zone: UTC+01:00 (CET)
  - Summer (DST): UTC+02:00 (CEST)
- INSEE/Postal code: 72139 /72610
- ^{1} French Land Register data, which excludes lakes, ponds, glaciers > 1 km^{2} (0.386 sq mi or 247 acres) and river estuaries.

Fyé (French pronunciation: [fje]) is a commune in the Sarthe department in the region of Pays de la Loire in north-western France.

== Geography ==
The commune is made up of the following collection of villages and hamlets, Les Touches, La Sorie, Le Boulay, La Vallée des Bois, Le Bignon, Fyé, La Houdairie, Le Moulin Neuf and La Gannerie.

== Population ==
Historical population
Year	Pop.	±% p.a.
1968	776	—
1975	831	+0.98%
1982	836	+0.09%
1990	802	−0.52%
1999	863	+0.82%
2007	1,007	+1.95%
2012	1,010	+0.06%
2017	992	−0.36%
2023	1,013	+0.35%
Source: INSEE

== See also ==
- Communes of the Sarthe department
