= Orgères =

Orgères refers to two communes in France:

- Orgères, Ille-et-Vilaine
- Orgères, Orne
