= Le Ménil-Vicomte =

- Commune
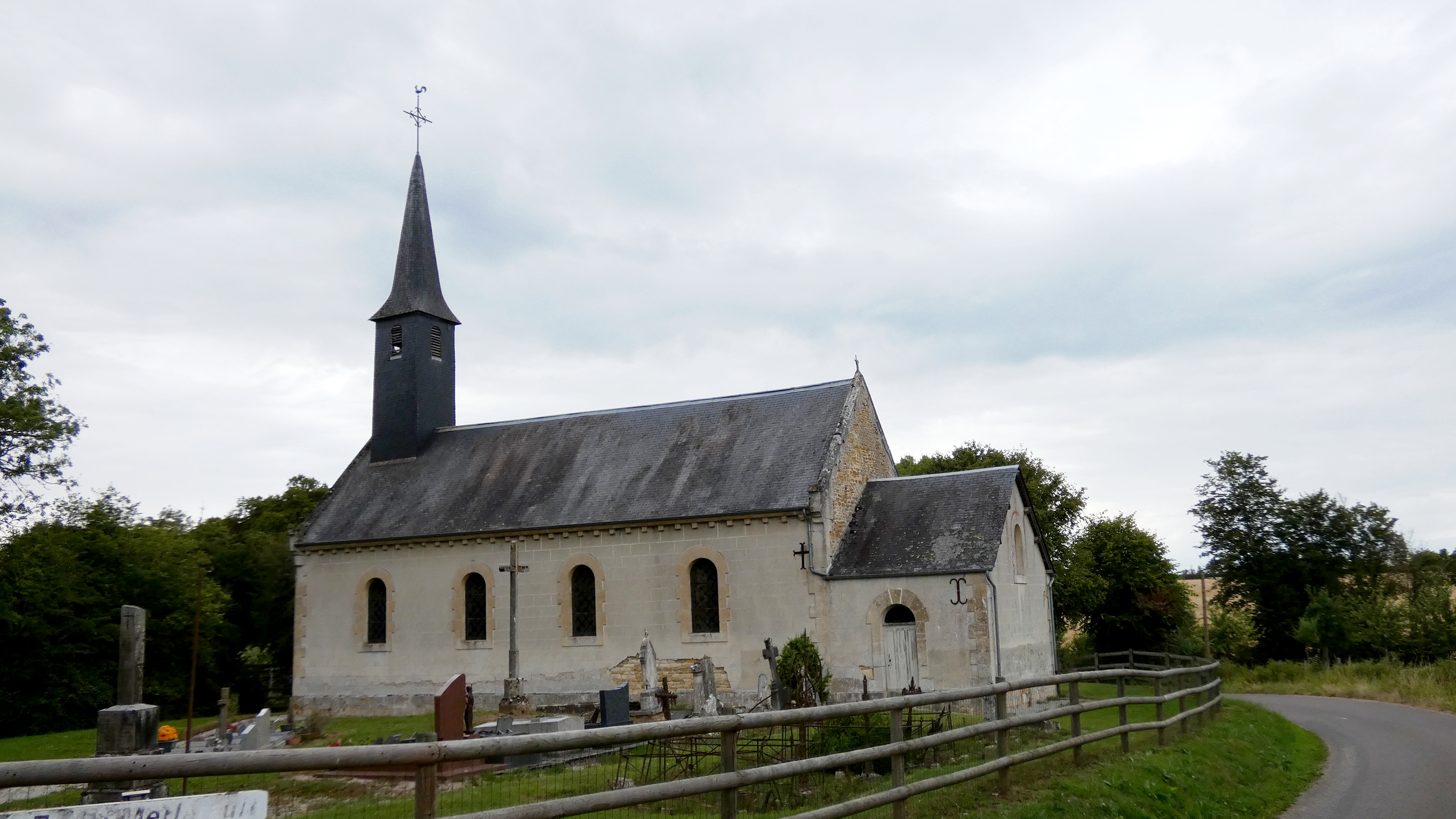
- Location of Le Ménil-Vicomte
- Location within France Location within Normandy
- Coordinates: 48°45′01″N 0°17′50″E
- Country: France
- Region: Normandy
- Department: Orne
- Arrondissement: Mortagne-au-Perche
- Canton: Rai
- Intercommunality: Vallées d'Auge et du Merlerault

Government
  - Mayor (2020–2026): Paul Langlois
- Area^{1}: 3.86 km^{2} (1.49 sq mi)
- Elevation: 260 m (850 ft)
- Highest elevation: 288 m (945 ft)
- Lowest elevation: 205 m (673 ft)
- Population (2023): 29
  - Density: 7.5/km^{2} (19/sq mi)
- Demonym: Mesnil-Vicomtois
- Time zone: UTC+01:00 (CET)
  - Summer (DST): UTC+02:00 (CEST)
- INSEE/Postal code: 61272 /61240
- ^{1} French Land Register data, which excludes lakes, ponds, glaciers > 1 km^{2} (0.386 sq mi or 247 acres) and river estuaries.

Le Ménil-Vicomte (French pronunciation: [lə menil vikɔ̃t]) is a commune in the Orne department in north-western France.

== Geography ==
The comune is made up of the following collection of villages and hamlets, Le Ménil-Vicomte and Village Neuf.

The Commune is one of 27 communes that make up the Natura 2000 protected area of Bocages et vergers du sud Pays d'Auge.

Two watercourses Ruisseau du Bouillonnay, and Ruisseau du Menil pass through the commmune.

== See also ==
- Communes of the Orne department
