= Ure (Orne) =

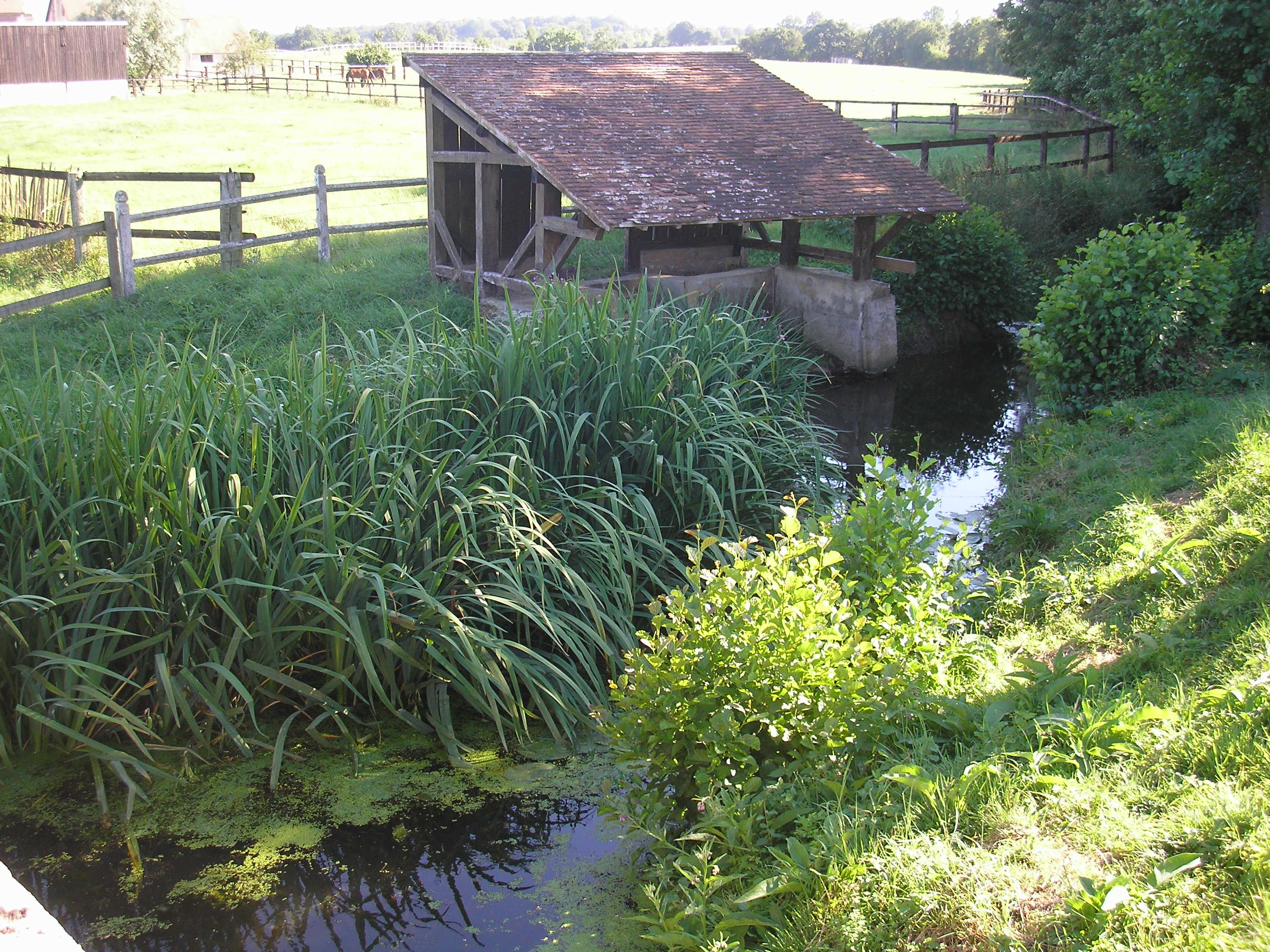
- The Ure flowing through La Cochere

- Location within France Location within Normandy

Location
- Country: France

Physical characteristics
- Source
  - location: Ménil-Froger, Orne
  - coordinates: 48°44′30″N 0°16′02″E
- Mouth: Orne
  - coordinates: 48°44′05″N 0°00′30″W
- Length: 30.21 km (18.77 mi)

Basin features
- Progression: Orne→ English Channel

The Ure (French pronunciation: [yʁ]) is a river in northwestern France, crossing the department of the Orne. It is 30.21 km long. Its source is in Ménil-Froger, and it flows into the river Orne.

== Tributaries ==
The biggest tributary for the Ure is La Dieuge (15.6 km long)

== Communes ==
The Ure passes through the following Communes:

1. Argentan
2. Croisilles
3. Ginai
4. Ménil-Froger
5. Nonant-le-Pin
6. Le Pin-au-Haras
7. Sai
8. Saint-Germain-de-Clairefeuille
9. Gouffern en Auge
