= Rai, Orne =

Rai
- Commune
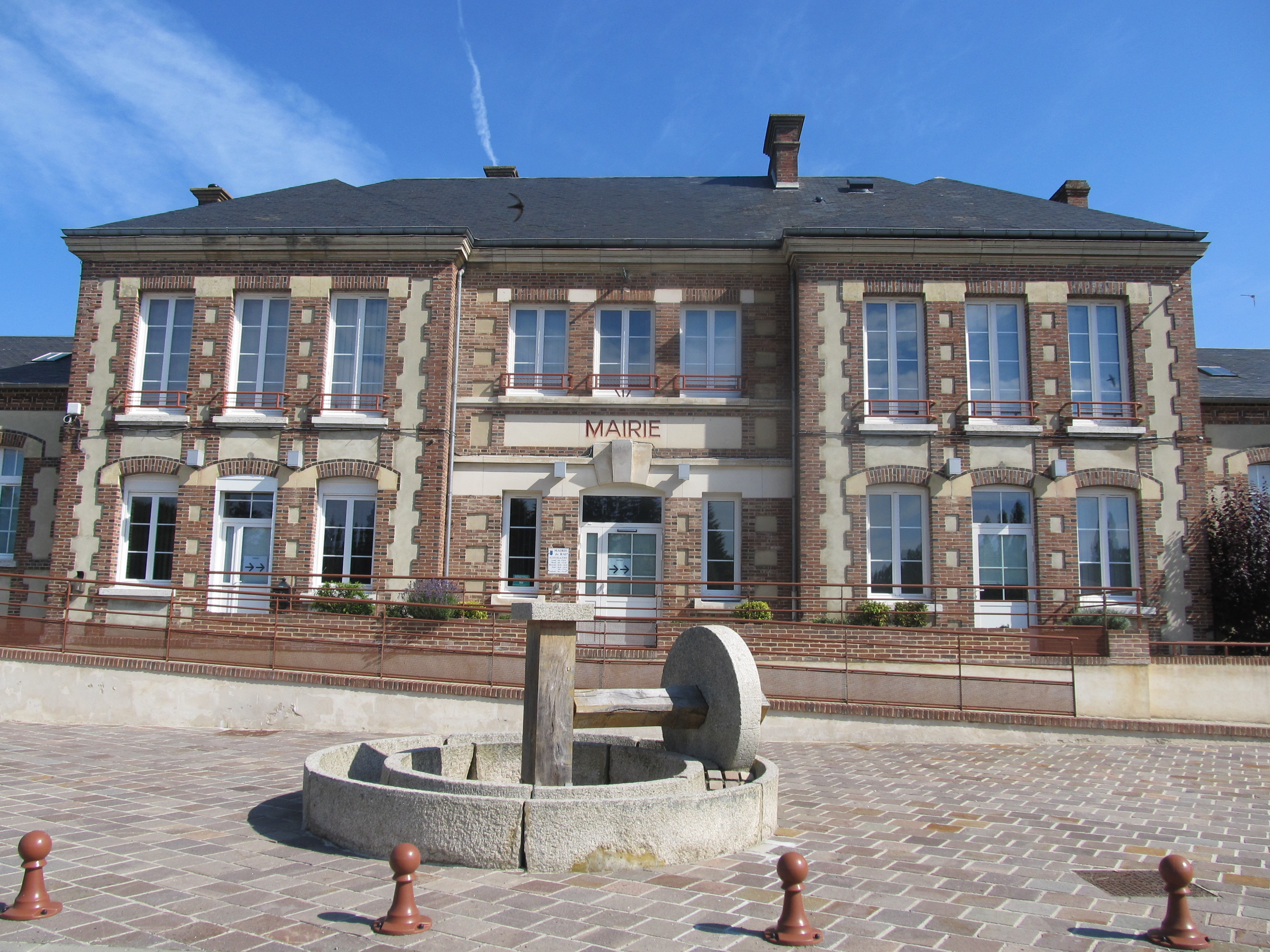
- The town hall in Rai
- Location of Rai
- Location within France Location within Normandy
- Coordinates: 48°45′03″N 0°34′54″E
- Country: France
- Region: Normandy
- Department: Orne
- Arrondissement: Mortagne-au-Perche
- Canton: Rai
- Intercommunality: Pays de l'Aigle

Government
  - Mayor (2020–2026): Michel Marot
- Area^{1}: 16.03 km^{2} (6.19 sq mi)
- Elevation: 210 m (690 ft)
- Highest elevation: 290 m (950 ft)
- Lowest elevation: 202 m (663 ft)
- Population (2023): 1,430
  - Density: 89.2/km^{2} (231/sq mi)
- Time zone: UTC+01:00 (CET)
  - Summer (DST): UTC+02:00 (CEST)
- INSEE/Postal code: 61342 /61270
- ^{1} French Land Register data, which excludes lakes, ponds, glaciers > 1 km^{2} (0.386 sq mi or 247 acres) and river estuaries.

Rai is a commune in the Orne department in north-western France.

== Geography ==
The commune is made up of the following collection of villages and hamlets, Les Chabottières, Long Champ, La Bornière, La Teunière, Grand Champ, La Desverie, La Maisonnette, La Gibonnière, Saint-Pair, Le Val, Saint-Pair, La Foulnerie, Rai and Corru.

The river Risle flows through the commune, plus there is a stream the Ruisseau de Corru.

== Points of Interest ==
- Musée vivant de l'énergie - A museum specialising in showing machinery from between 1800 and 1950. The museum has been in operation since 2004, first based in Chandai, before moving to Rai.

== See also ==
- Communes of the Orne department
