= Bocages et vergers du sud Pays d'Auge =

Natura 2000 area in Normandy, France

- Location within France
- Location: Orne, Normandy
- Coordinates: 48.73389°N 0.29694°E
- Area: 21,511 ha (83.05 sq mi)
- Established: 12 December, 2008

Bocages et vergers du sud Pays d'Auge translated as the Bocages and orchards of the southern Pays d'Auge is a Natura 2000 conservation area that is 21,511 hectares in size.

== Geography ==
The area is a well-preserved wooded landscape that features dense hedges which shelter old trees whose pollarding has allowed cavities to appear in these trees, suitable for certain types of insects. The area is mostly agricultural with 5 % being scrubland and the remaining 5% being forested.

It is spread across 27 different communes all within the Orne department;

1. Almenêches
2. Champ-Haut
3. Cisai-Saint-Aubin
4. Coulmer
5. Croisilles
6. Échauffour
7. La Ferrière-au-Doyen
8. Gacé
9. Ginai
10. Gouffern en Auge
11. Lignères
12. Mahéru
13. Merlerault-le-Pin
14. Moulins-la-Marche
15. Ménil-Froger
16. Ménil-Hubert-en-Exmes
17. Le Ménil-Vicomte
18. Orgères
19. Le Pin-au-Haras
20. Planches
21. Résenlieu
22. Saint-Evroult-Notre-Dame-du-Bois
23. Saint-Evroult-de-Montfort
24. Saint-Germain-de-Clairefeuille
25. Saint-Pierre-des-Loges
26. Sainte-Gauburge-Sainte-Colombe
27. La Trinité-des-Laitiers

== Conservation ==
The conservation area has three species of insect listed in Annex 2 of the Habitats Directive;

1. European stag beetle
2. Hermit beetle
3. Great capricorn beetle
