= Touquettes =

- Commune
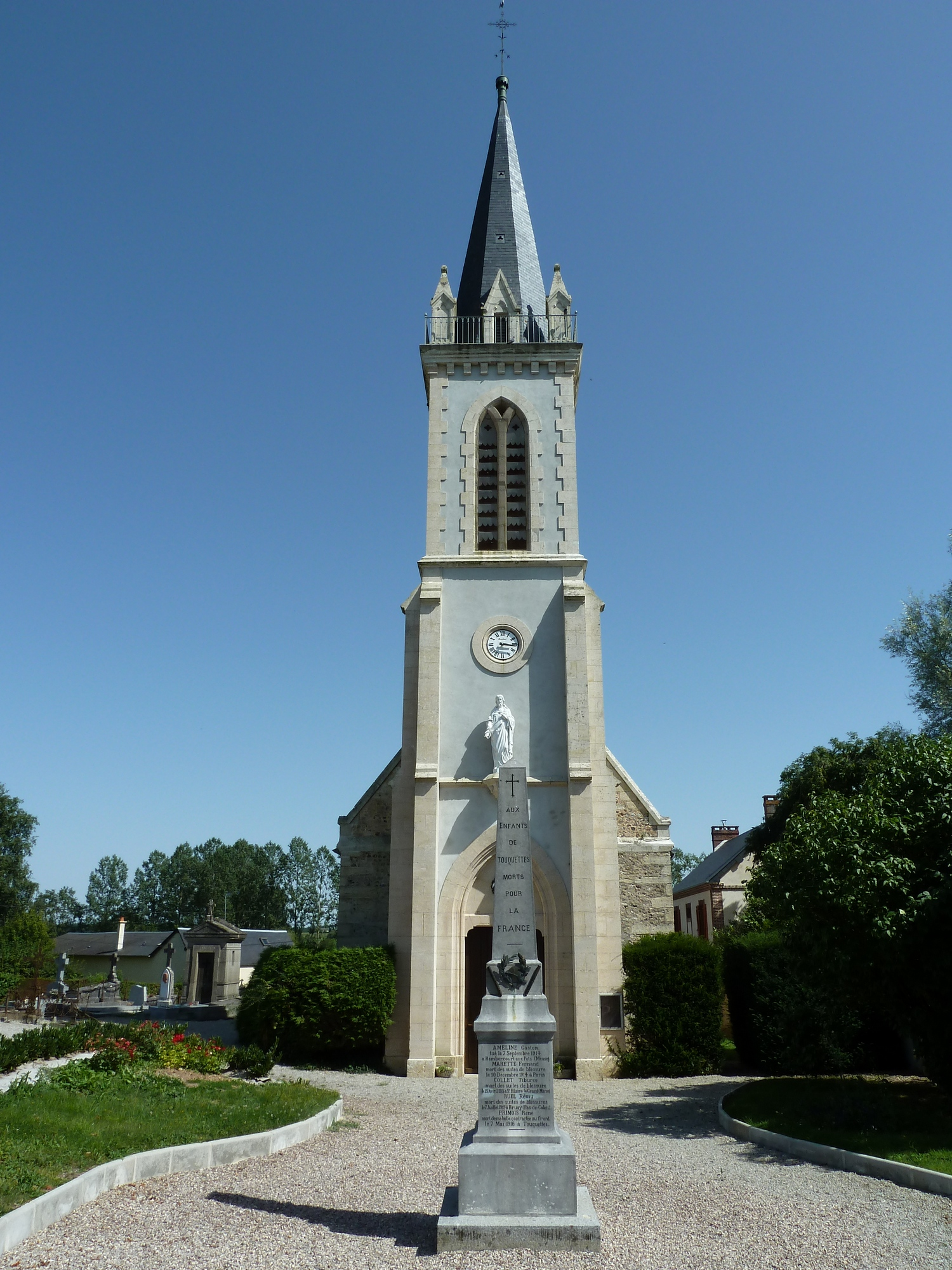
- The church in Touquettes
- Location of Touquettes
- Location within France Location within Normandy
- Coordinates: 48°47′54″N 0°25′26″E
- Country: France
- Region: Normandy
- Department: Orne
- Arrondissement: Mortagne-au-Perche
- Canton: Rai
- Intercommunality: Pays de L'Aigle

Government
  - Mayor (2020–2026): Sylvie Farault
- Area^{1}: 9.73 km^{2} (3.76 sq mi)
- Elevation: 280 m (920 ft)
- Highest elevation: 321 m (1,053 ft)
- Lowest elevation: 227 m (745 ft)
- Population (2023): 75
  - Density: 7.7/km^{2} (20/sq mi)
- Time zone: UTC+01:00 (CET)
  - Summer (DST): UTC+02:00 (CEST)
- INSEE/Postal code: 61488 /61550
- ^{1} French Land Register data, which excludes lakes, ponds, glaciers > 1 km^{2} (0.386 sq mi or 247 acres) and river estuaries.

Touquettes (French pronunciation: [tukɛt]) is a commune in the Orne department in north-western France.

== Geography ==
The Touquettes river flows through the commune. in addition a stream Ruisseau des Vaux also traverses through the commune.

== See also ==
- Communes of the Orne department
