= Fay, Orne =

Fay
- Commune
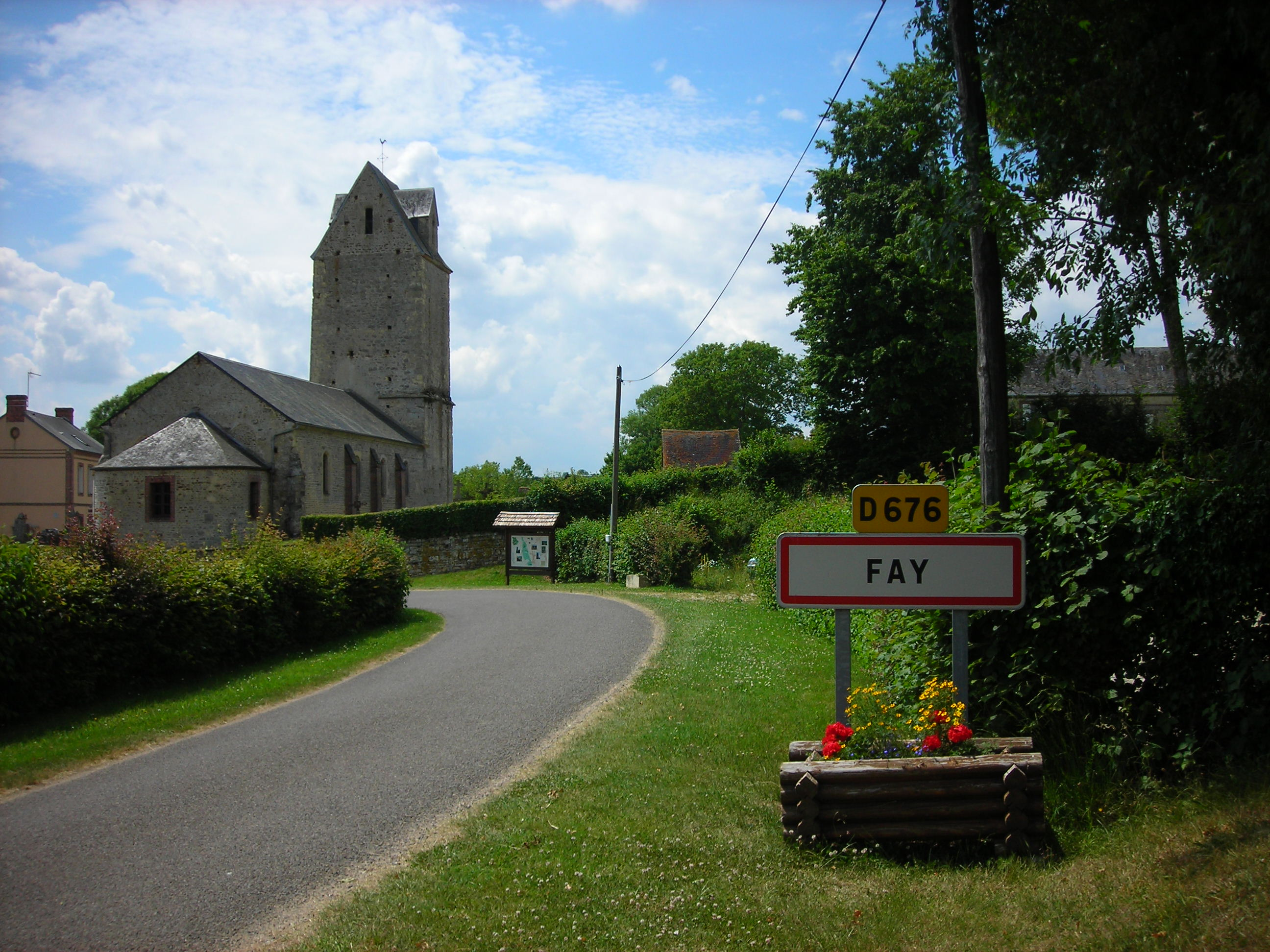
- The road into Fay
- Location of Fay
- Location within France Location within Normandy
- Coordinates: 48°39′36″N 0°24′33″E
- Country: France
- Region: Normandy
- Department: Orne
- Arrondissement: Mortagne-au-Perche
- Canton: Rai
- Intercommunality: Pays de L'Aigle

Government
  - Mayor (2023–2026): Pierre Dufay
- Area^{1}: 8.68 km^{2} (3.35 sq mi)
- Elevation: 300 m (980 ft)
- Highest elevation: 310 m (1,020 ft)
- Lowest elevation: 184 m (604 ft)
- Population (2023): 69
  - Density: 7.9/km^{2} (21/sq mi)
- Time zone: UTC+01:00 (CET)
  - Summer (DST): UTC+02:00 (CEST)
- INSEE/Postal code: 61159 /61390
- ^{1} French Land Register data, which excludes lakes, ponds, glaciers > 1 km^{2} (0.386 sq mi or 247 acres) and river estuaries.

Fay is a commune in the Orne department in north-western France.

== Geography ==
Fay is made up of the following collection of villages and hamlets, Crasse, La Crochetière, Fay, La Choletière and Le Buisson de Fay.

The river Le Fay flows through the commune.

== See also ==
- Communes of the Orne department
