= Saint-Symphorien-des-Bruyères =

- Commune
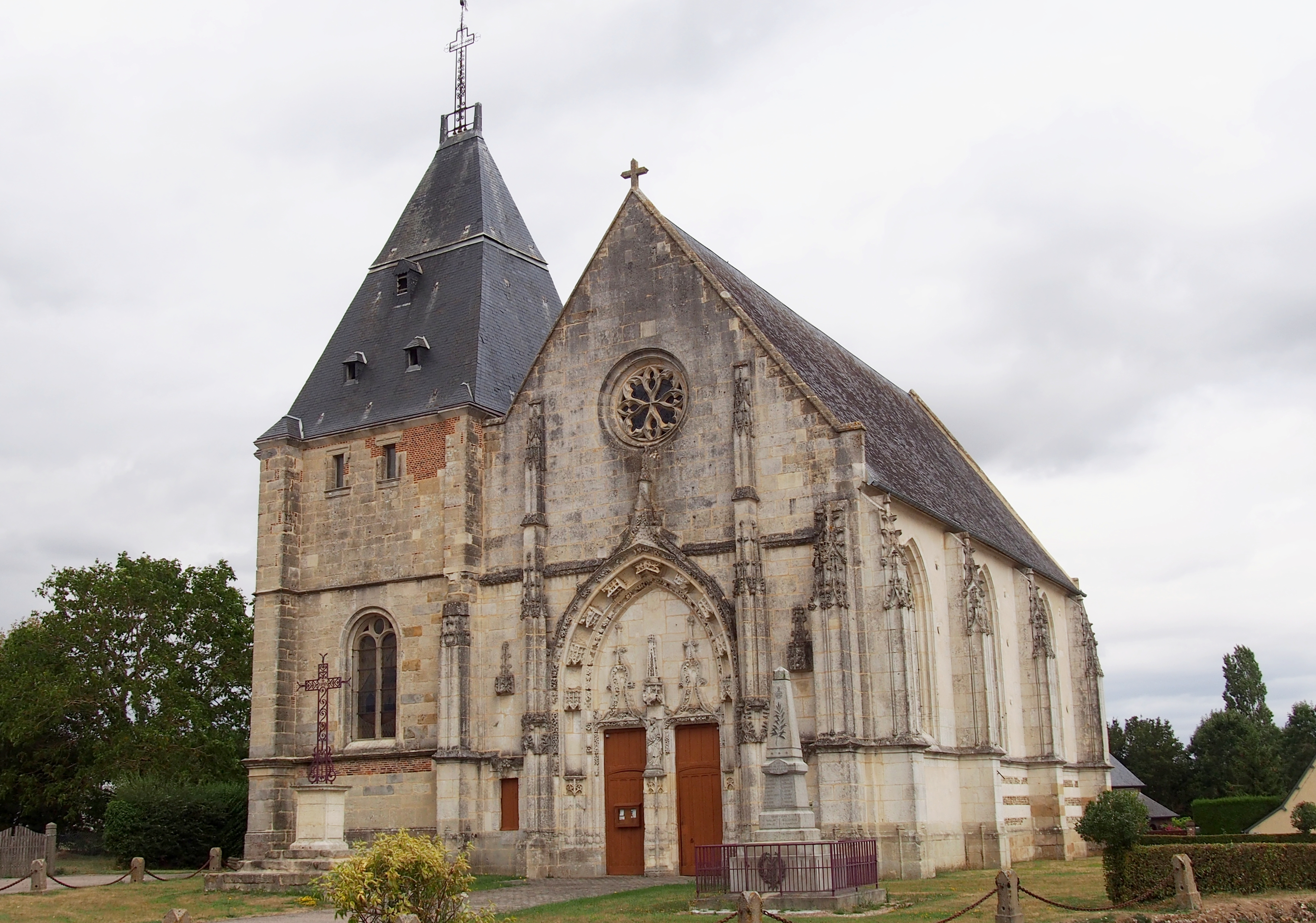
- The church in Saint-Symphorien-des-Bruyères
- Location of Saint-Symphorien-des-Bruyères
- Location within France Location within Normandy
- Coordinates: 48°47′21″N 0°35′00″E
- Country: France
- Region: Normandy
- Department: Orne
- Arrondissement: Mortagne-au-Perche
- Canton: Rai
- Intercommunality: Pays de l'Aigle

Government
  - Mayor (2020–2026): Guy Martel
- Area^{1}: 16.02 km^{2} (6.19 sq mi)
- Elevation: 246 m (807 ft)
- Highest elevation: 294 m (965 ft)
- Lowest elevation: 230 m (750 ft)
- Population (2023): 494
  - Density: 30.8/km^{2} (79.9/sq mi)
- Time zone: UTC+01:00 (CET)
  - Summer (DST): UTC+02:00 (CEST)
- INSEE/Postal code: 61457 /61300
- ^{1} French Land Register data, which excludes lakes, ponds, glaciers > 1 km^{2} (0.386 sq mi or 247 acres) and river estuaries.

Saint-Symphorien-des-Bruyères (French pronunciation: [sɛ̃ sɛ̃fɔʁjɛ̃ de bʁɥijɛʁ]) is a commune in the Orne department in north-western France.

== Points of interest ==
=== National heritage sites ===
- Église Saint-Symphorien de Saint-Symphorien-des-Bruyères a fifteenth century church, it was registered as a Monument historique in 1926.

== See also ==
- Communes of the Orne department
