= Écorcei =

- Commune
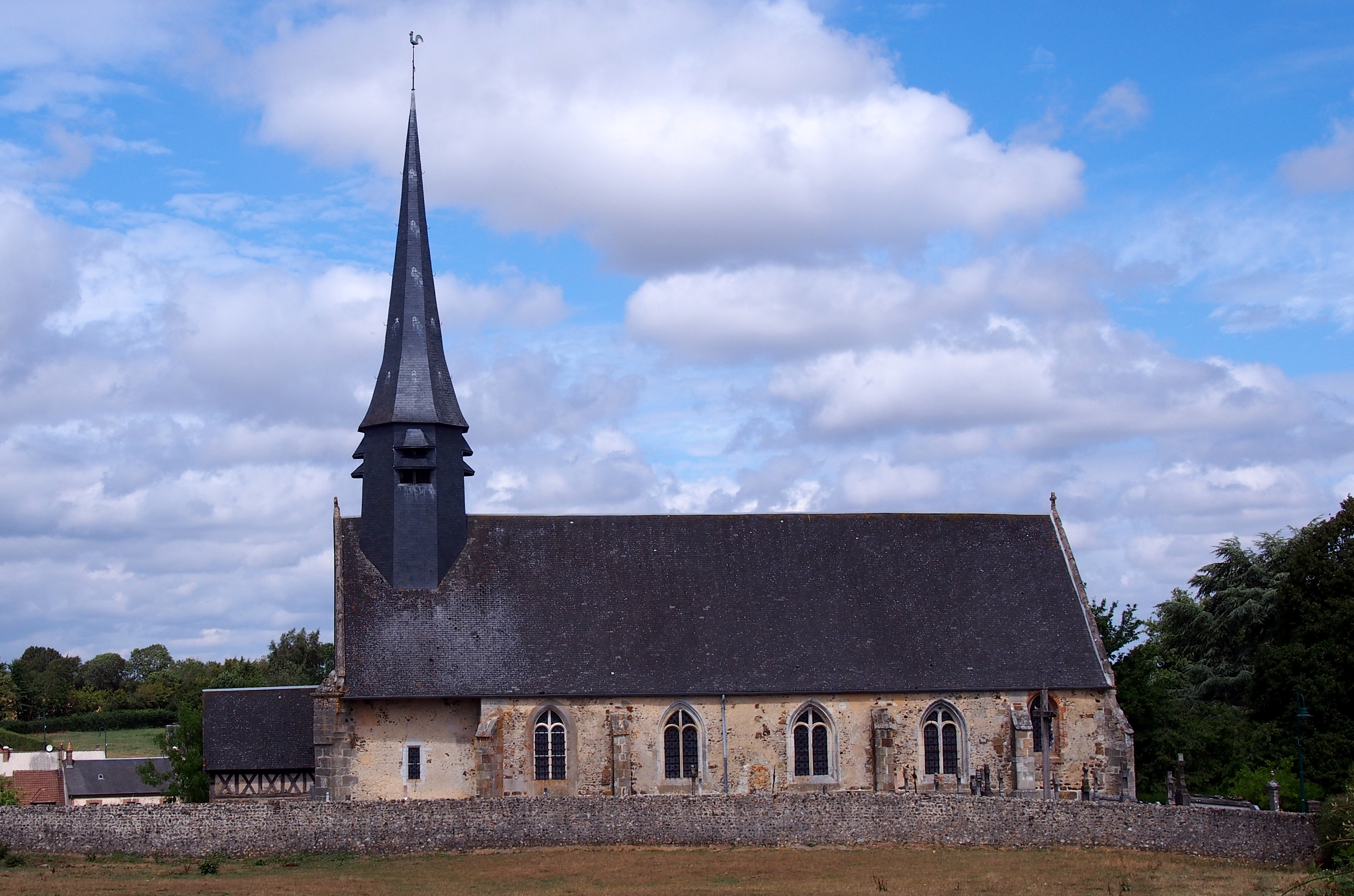
- Location of Écorcei
- Location within France Location within Normandy
- Coordinates: 48°43′15″N 0°34′49″E
- Country: France
- Region: Normandy
- Department: Orne
- Arrondissement: Mortagne-au-Perche
- Canton: Rai
- Intercommunality: Pays de l'Aigle

Government
  - Mayor (2020–2026): Philippe Thouret
- Area^{1}: 9.47 km^{2} (3.66 sq mi)
- Elevation: 278 m (912 ft)
- Highest elevation: 272 m (892 ft)
- Lowest elevation: 227 m (745 ft)
- Population (2023): 367
  - Density: 38.8/km^{2} (100/sq mi)
- Time zone: UTC+01:00 (CET)
  - Summer (DST): UTC+02:00 (CEST)
- INSEE/Postal code: 61151 /61270
- ^{1} French Land Register data, which excludes lakes, ponds, glaciers > 1 km^{2} (0.386 sq mi or 247 acres) and river estuaries.

Écorcei (French pronunciation: [ekɔʁsɛ]) is a commune in the Orne department in north-western France.

== Geography ==
The commune is made up of the following collection of villages and hamlets, Le Nouveau Monde, Le Frileux, La Clémendière, Écorcei, La Bouchardière, Le Hamel and Fémisson.

The Ruisseau du Gru stream flows through the commune.

== See also ==
- Communes of the Orne department
