= Coulmer =

- Commune
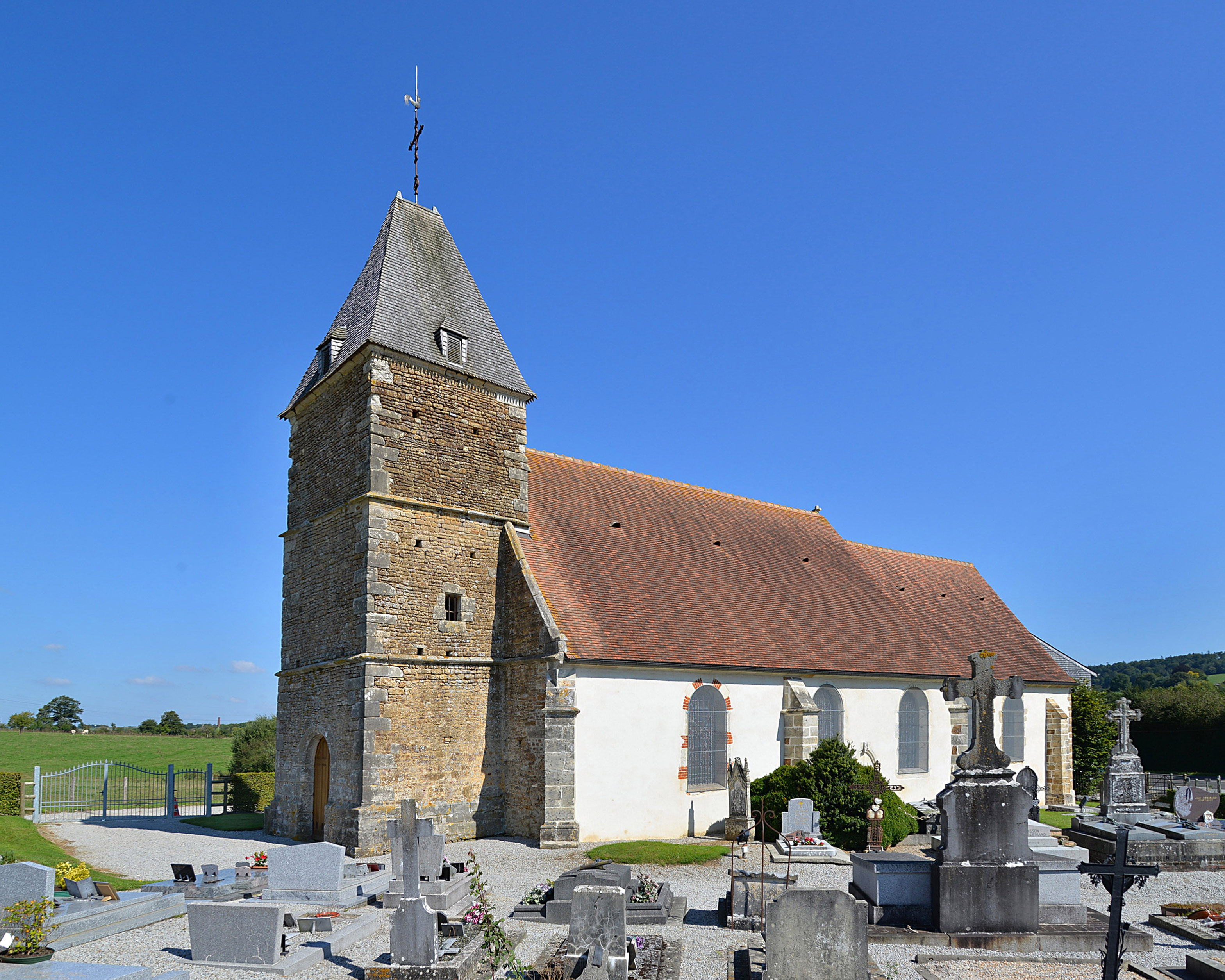
- The church in Coulmer
- Location of Coulmer
- Location within France Location within Normandy
- Coordinates: 48°46′32″N 0°17′52″E
- Country: France
- Region: Normandy
- Department: Orne
- Arrondissement: Mortagne-au-Perche
- Canton: Vimoutiers
- Intercommunality: Vallées d'Auge et du Merlerault

Government
  - Mayor (2020–2026): Chantal Nicoleau
- Area^{1}: 6.68 km^{2} (2.58 sq mi)
- Elevation: 192 m (630 ft)
- Highest elevation: 300 m (980 ft)
- Lowest elevation: 189 m (620 ft)
- Population (2023): 81
  - Density: 12/km^{2} (31/sq mi)
- Time zone: UTC+01:00 (CET)
  - Summer (DST): UTC+02:00 (CEST)
- INSEE/Postal code: 61122 /61230
- ^{1} French Land Register data, which excludes lakes, ponds, glaciers > 1 km^{2} (0.386 sq mi or 247 acres) and river estuaries.

Coulmer is a commune in the Orne department in north-western France.

== Geography ==
The commune is made up of the following collection of villages and hamlets, Le Chêne, Le Pommeret, La Faudinière, Les Portes and Coulmer.

The Commune is one of 27 communes that make up the Natura 2000 protected area of Bocages et vergers du sud Pays d'Auge.

The commune has two rivers flowing through its borders, The Touques and the Maure. In addition it has 5 streams running through it, La Noe, the Bouillant, the Bouillonnay, the Launay and the Menil.

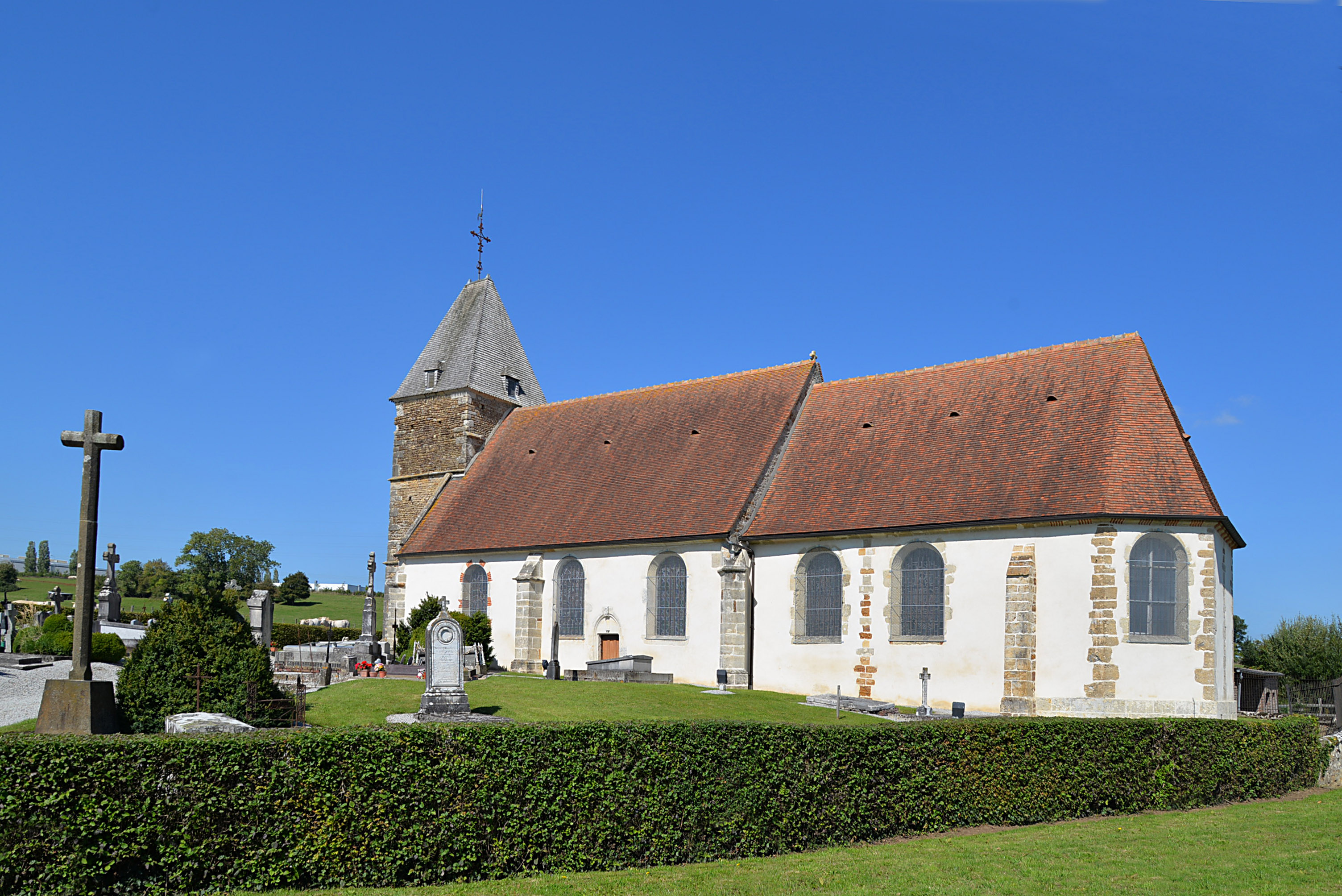
Saint-Martin Church in Coulmer

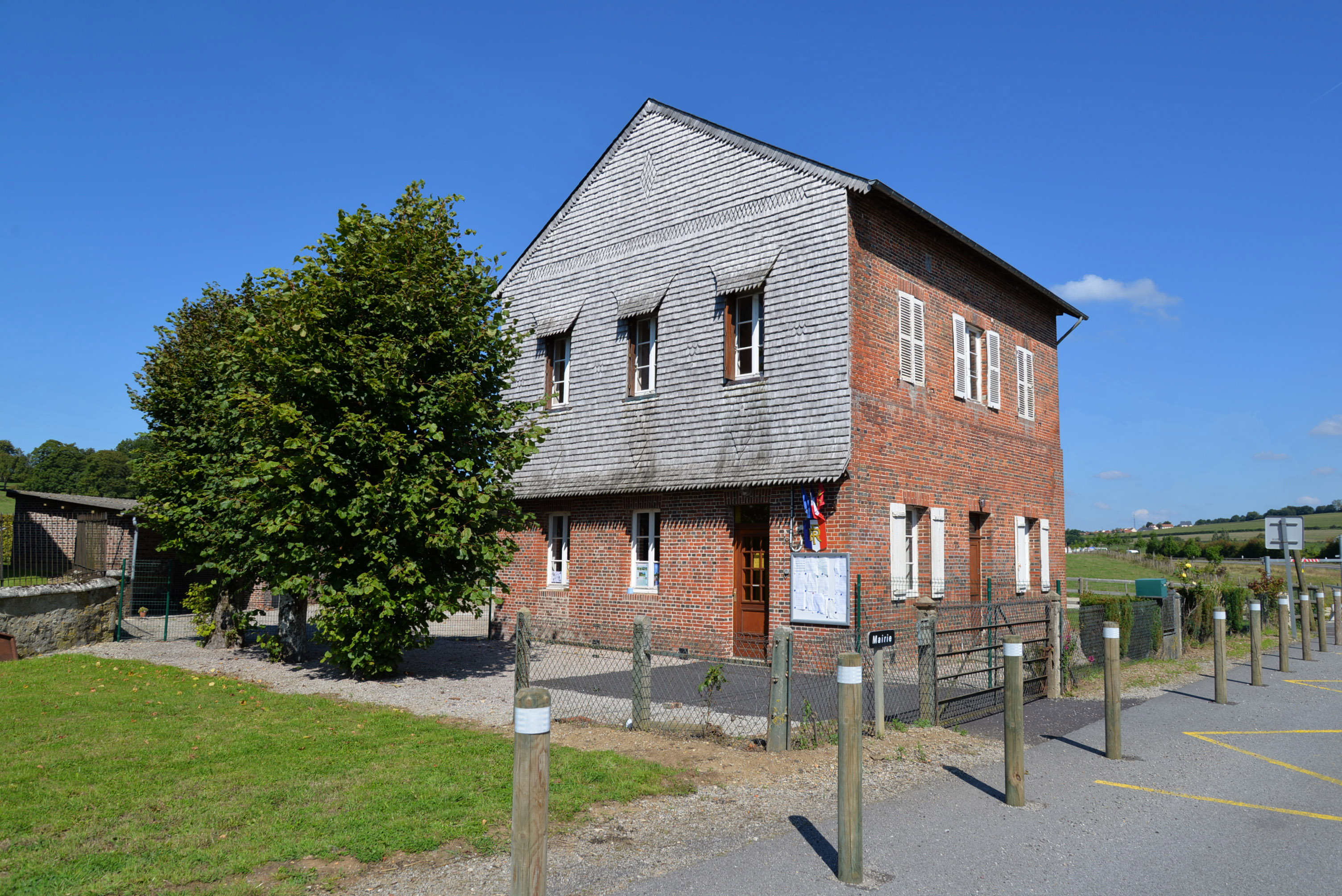
Mayors office in Coulmer

== See also ==
- Communes of the Orne department
