= Lignères =

- Commune
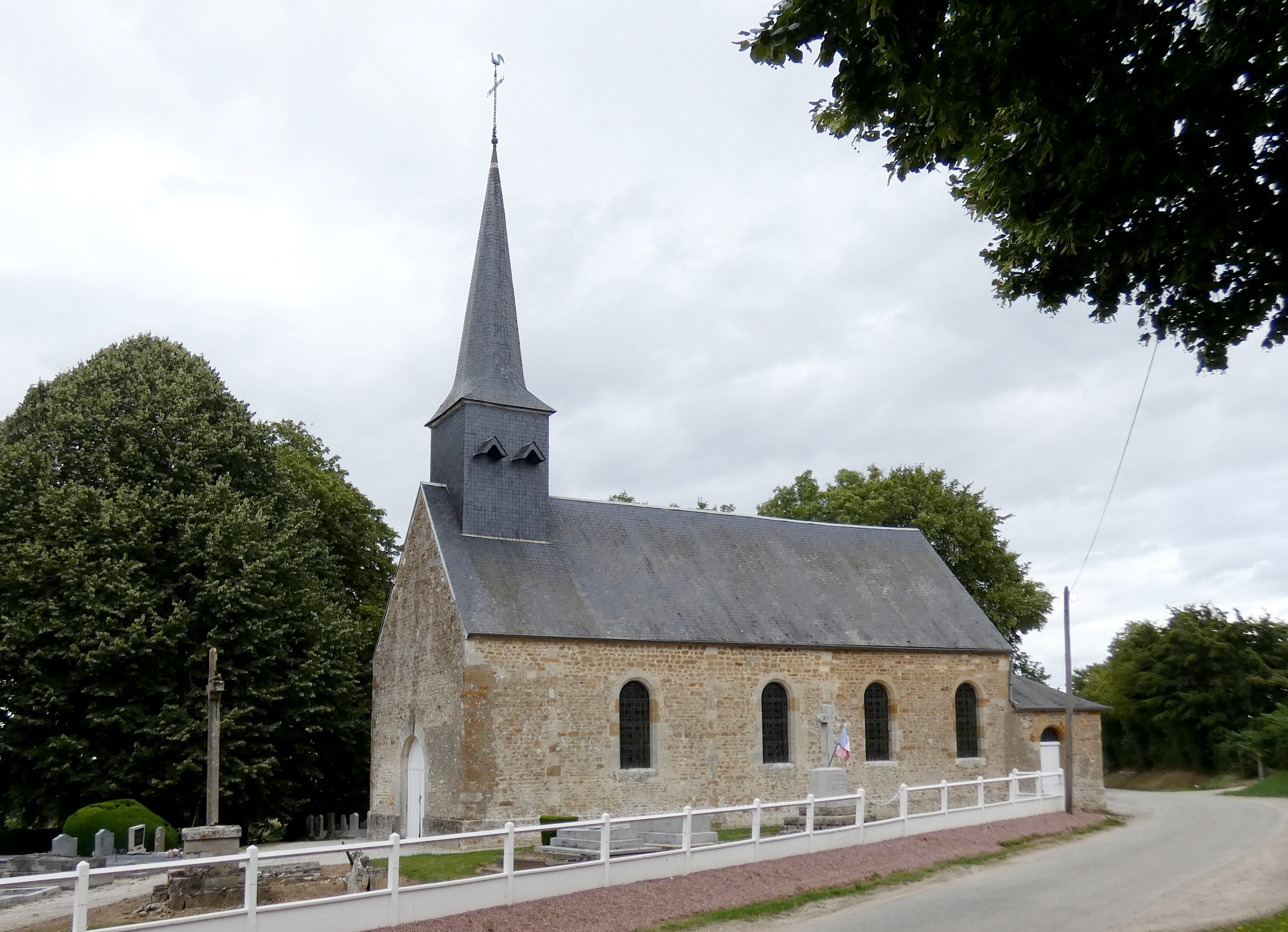
- Location of Lignères
- Location within France Location within Normandy
- Coordinates: 48°44′09″N 0°18′40″E
- Country: France
- Region: Normandy
- Department: Orne
- Arrondissement: Mortagne-au-Perche
- Canton: Rai
- Intercommunality: Vallées d'Auge et du Merlerault

Government
  - Mayor (2020–2026): Daniel Cotrel-Lassaussaye
- Area^{1}: 5.37 km^{2} (2.07 sq mi)
- Elevation: 290 m (950 ft)
- Highest elevation: 285 m (935 ft)
- Lowest elevation: 203 m (666 ft)
- Population (2023): 32
  - Density: 6.0/km^{2} (15/sq mi)
- Demonym(s): Lignérois, Lignéroises
- Time zone: UTC+01:00 (CET)
  - Summer (DST): UTC+02:00 (CEST)
- INSEE/Postal code: 61225 /61240
- ^{1} French Land Register data, which excludes lakes, ponds, glaciers > 1 km^{2} (0.386 sq mi or 247 acres) and river estuaries.

Lignères (French pronunciation: [liɲɛʁ]) is a commune in the Orne department in north-western France.

== Population ==
Historical population
Year	Pop.	±% p.a.
1968	83	—
1975	80	−0.52%
1982	54	−5.46%
1990	40	−3.68%
1999	50	+2.51%
2007	31	−5.80%
2012	26	−3.46%
2017	28	+1.49%
2023	32	+2.25%
Source: INSEE

== Geography ==
Lignères is made up of the following collection of villages and hamlets, Lignères and Darnétal.

Lignères is located between L'Aigle and Argentan. The town can be accessed via exit number 16 of the A28 highway, followed by Departmental Road 932 and RD 232.

The Commune is one of 27 communes that make up the Natura 2000 protected area of Bocages et vergers du sud Pays d'Auge.

The river La Maure plus three streams, Ruisseau du Menil, Ruisseau de Veaulecent and Ruisseau des Viviers flow through the commune.

== See also ==
- Communes of the Orne department
