= Saint-Germain-de-Clairefeuille =

- Commune
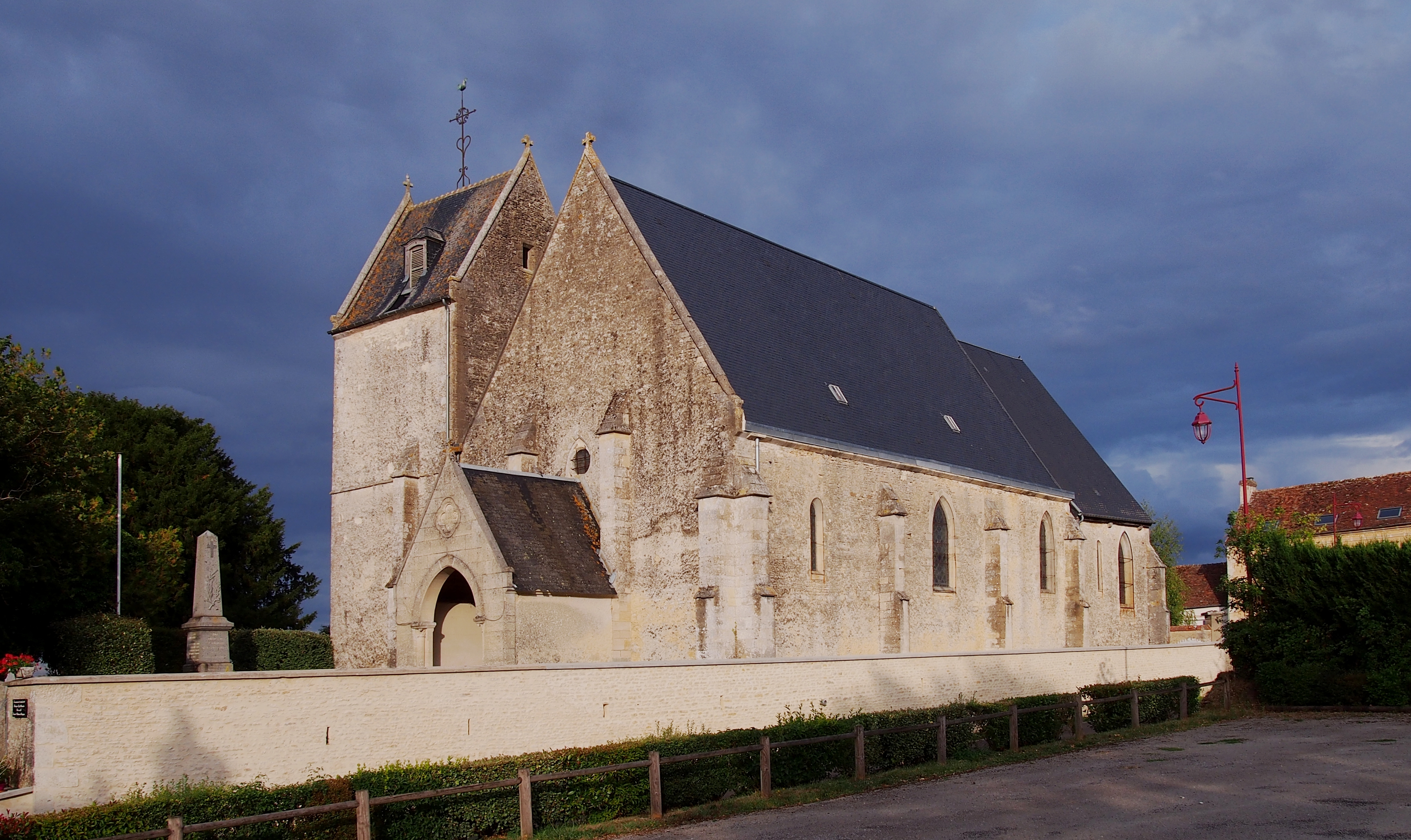
- Location of Saint-Germain-de-Clairefeuille
- Location within France Location within Normandy
- Coordinates: 48°42′51″N 0°14′19″E
- Country: France
- Region: Normandy
- Department: Orne
- Arrondissement: Mortagne-au-Perche
- Canton: Rai

Government
  - Mayor (2024–2026): Sylvie Avenel
- Area^{1}: 12.31 km^{2} (4.75 sq mi)
- Elevation: 210 m (690 ft)
- Highest elevation: 269 m (883 ft)
- Lowest elevation: 183 m (600 ft)
- Population (2023): 132
  - Density: 10.7/km^{2} (27.8/sq mi)
- Time zone: UTC+01:00 (CET)
  - Summer (DST): UTC+02:00 (CEST)
- INSEE/Postal code: 61393 /61240
- ^{1} French Land Register data, which excludes lakes, ponds, glaciers > 1 km^{2} (0.386 sq mi or 247 acres) and river estuaries.

Saint-Germain-de-Clairefeuille (French pronunciation: [sɛ̃ ʒɛʁmɛ̃ də klɛʁfœj]) is a commune in the Orne department in north-western France.

== Geography ==
The commune is made up of the following collection of villages and hamlets, La Guicharderie, La Barbetière, Le Recouvray, La Trouillère, Les Orgeries, La Porte, La Corbette, Clairefeuille and Saint-Germain-de-Clairefeuille.

The Commune is one of 27 communes that make up the Natura 2000 protected area of Bocages et vergers du sud Pays d'Auge.

Saint-Germain-de-Clairefeuille has 2 rivers that run through it, the Dieuge and the Ure.

== Points of Interest ==
- Coteau du Mont Chauvel is a 5 hectare site classed as a Sensitive Natural Space of orne. The site is the only place in Normandy to see the very rare bug orchid, in addition to Red-backed shrike and Northern crested newt.

== See also ==
- Communes of the Orne department
