= Paul Harel =

French poet and innkeeper

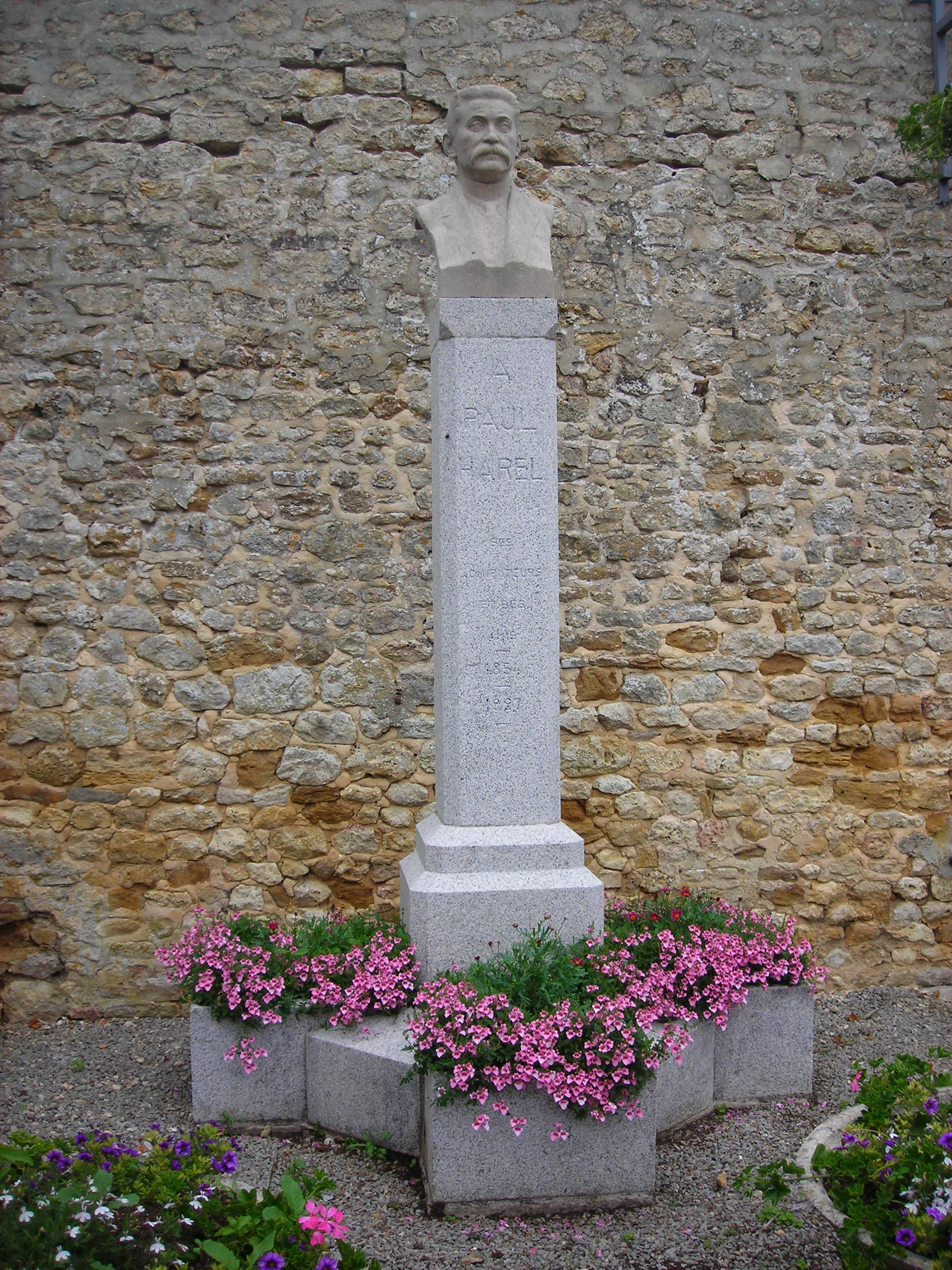
Stature of Harel in Échauffour.

Paul Harel, born in Échauffour on May 18, 1854, and died on March 7, 1927, was a French poet and innkeeper.

== Biography ==
=== Early life ===
Son of a Saint-Lô lawyer, Paul Harel often skipped school and was apprenticed to the pharmacist of Montreuil-l'Argillé at the age of fourteen, where he sold ointments while learning a little Latin from the local priest. From sixteen to nineteen, he was a typographer in Nogent-le-Rotrou, where he prints the works of Paulin Paris, Gaston Paris and Paul Meyer

Théophile Féret said of him:

"Since the rhymes of brooch and sword, everyone knows the innkeeper of Échauffour, and since the Memories of inn, he has annexed his great hall to literature Norman. Before Barres, he identified some of the intimate connections between lineage, soil and ancestral worship. He wanted to root us in the homeland. "

In the preface to his first collection, Under the Apple Trees, published in 1879, Paul Harel took care to explain why he embraced the profession of hotelier:

"My father was a lawyer, my grandfather innkeeper; I took up the job of this one for the sake of the picturesque. I thought I ought to give this bad example to my contemporaries, at a time when the sons of the earth are deserting their homes, where the life of the ancestors is unknown, if not scorned. If he has not regretted his choice, it is also a little because for him, "the great secret of everything is in charity", and that the ancestral profession allows him to practice this virtue on a large scale by welcoming to his home the poor, the beggars who pass on the road.

=== Later life ===
Paul Harel was loved in return. He enjoyed a good reputation in his country. "In the Orne," says Féret, "one bears a religious tenderness to him. "

Paul Harel has sung the charms of nature and rural life with a sincerity and simplicity that exclude neither the picturesque nor the grandeur. In his last volume, which he prefers to others, The Far Hours (1903), he draws his inspiration above all from faith, which he can not conceive without charity. In 1895 he was called to direct, in Paris, a great Catholic magazine, La Quinzaine. But the splendours of the capital could not make him forget his native country: loving rustic simplicity, he soon resigned his directorial functions to return to Echauffour.

== Works ==
- Sous les pommiers, poésies, 1879
- Gousses d'ail et fleurs de serpolet, 1881
- Les Vingt-Huit Jours du caporal Ballandard, 1882
- Rimes de broche et d’épée, 1883
- Aux champs, 1886
- Gustave Le Vavasseur, 1888
- La Hanterie, 1889
- Souvenirs d’auberge, 1894
- Gorgeansac. La Petite Marthe. Le Nez du cousin Barnabé, 1898
- À l’Enseigne du Grand-Saint-André, 1906
- Ernest Millet, 1904
- La Vie et le mystère; sonnets, 1921
- Les Larmes, 1895
- Les Voix de la glèbe, 1895
- Les Voix de la glèbe, 1895
- Œuvres choisies, 1897
- Le Demi-sang, roman, 1898
- Les Heures lointaines, 1902
- Ernest Millet, 1904
- Œuvres : Heures lointaines. Aux champs. Voix de la glèbe. Poèmes inédits, 1904
- En forêt, 1906
- Hobereaux et villageois, 1911
- Mme de La Galaisière, 1913
- Poèmes mystiques et champêtres, 1914
- Devant les morts, poèmes de guerre, 1918
- La Vie et le Mystère, sonnets, 1921
- Poèmes à la gloire du Christ, suivis de poésies diverses, 1928
- Poèmes mystiques et champêtres, 1914
- La Marquise de Fleuré, 1923
- L'Herbager, pièce en 3 actes, en vers, Paris, Théâtre de l'Odéon, 19 septembre 1891 (Theater)
