= Marie-Thérèse Auffray =

French artist (1912-1990)

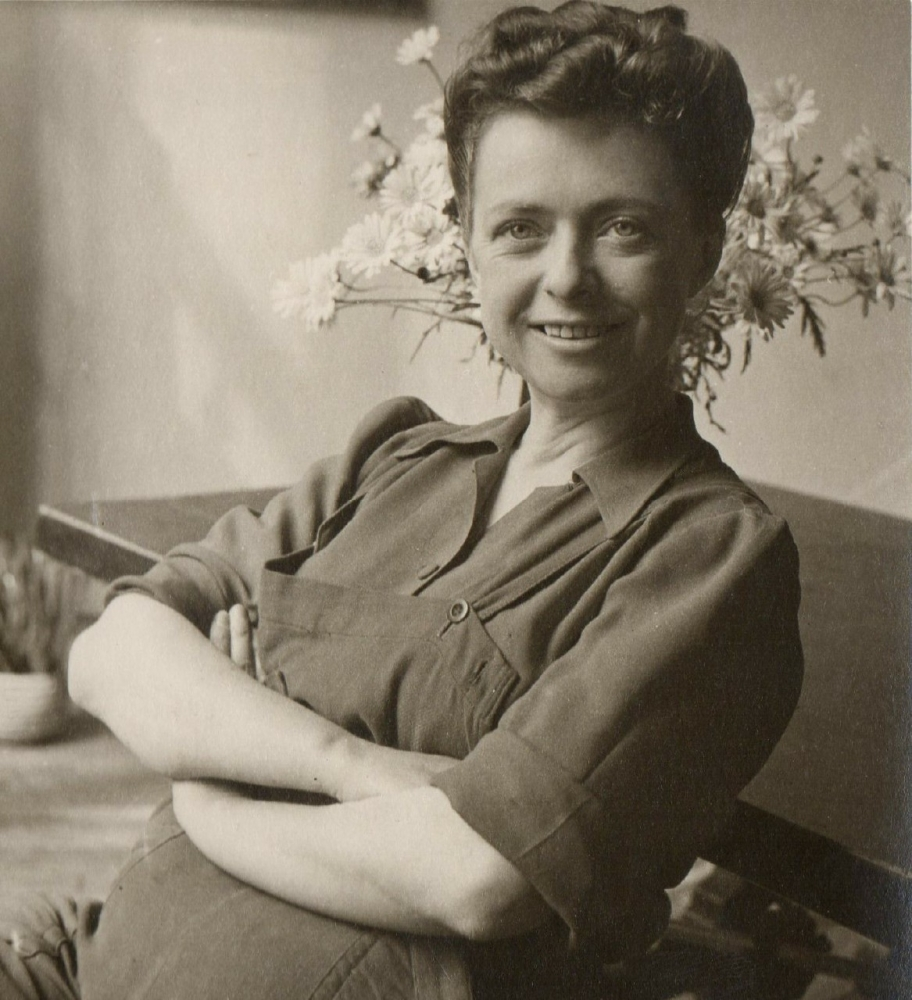
- Born: 11 October 1912; Saint-Quay-Portrieux, France
- Died: 27 September 1990 (aged 77); Echauffour, France
- Resting place: Echauffour
- Known for: Painting and heroine of the French Resistance during World War II
- Movement: Expressionism
- Spouse: Noëlle Guillou

Marie-Thérèse Auffray (11 October 1912 – 27 September 1990) was a French painter and fighter in the French Resistance during World War II. She began her career in the 14th arrondissement of Paris and was known for her expressionist works. She remained independent of the art market, whose mercantile codes she always rejected.

== Biography ==
=== The Parisian years ===
Attached to her native Brittany, Auffray nevertheless left Saint-Quay-Portrieux at a young age, setting off for Paris in 1920, upon the death of her father. Gifted in the arts, she quickly joined the world of artists that settled in Paris during the Années folles and attended the workshops at 11 rue d'Alésia, in the 14th arrondissement.

Auffray was noted for her talent as a poster artist and illustrator, but also for her paintings (still lifes and portraits). She moved into her own studio at 21 rue Gazan in 1942, continuing to frequent the galleries in the nearby rue d'Alésia. Her Parisian life was mainly spent in the art studio district of Parc Montsouris.

== Commitment to the Resistance ==
From the start of World War II, she joined the French Resistance, moving to Echauffour where she joined forces with another young resistant, Noëlle Guillou, her partner in life. As major figures of the Echauffour Resistance, they supplied Parisian resistance fighters with local produce from Normandy and are illustrated in heroic actions. Marie-Thérèse Auffray also saved Allied paratroopers, including the American aviator Arnold Pederson, for which U.S. President Dwight D. Eisenhower paid tribute to her.

== Post-war ==
In 1945, Auffray exhibited at the Galerie Drouant-David and the Galerie Lucy Krohg, in Paris. In 1947, she and Noëlle Guillou opened Le Bateau Ivre (The Drunken Boat), an atypical inn, book-shop and discotheque in Normandy. Auffray built its bar in form of boat, recalling her Breton roots and the famous poem "Le Bateau ivre" by French poet Arthur Rimbaud.

Auffray split her time between Echauffour and Paris, where she retained her studio in the 14th arrondissement and continued to paint all her life.

Her works were dispersed after her death, but, since the 2000s, Association MTA (acronym of its name) contributed to its rediscovery with several retrospectives recently devoted to Auffray: in 2016 (in Échauffour), in 2017 (in Paris, Orangerie du Sénat), and in 2018 (in Saint-Quay-Portrieux and Alençon).

== Exhibitions and retrospectives ==
- 1945: Galerie Drouart-David (Paris), "The Great Contemporary Painters at the Service of Prisoners".
- 1945: Lucy Krogh Gallery (Paris), Monographic exhibition (34 paintings)
- 1950s and 60s: Salon d'Automne, Salon des Indépendants, Salon des Tuileries, Salon des Champs-Elysées, Salon of Women Painters.
- 1962: Galerie du Colisée (Paris), Auffray retrospective (80 works)
- 2016 : Échauffour, "Clin d'Oeil"
- 2017: Orangery of the Senate (France), Retrospective.
- 2018: Saint-Quay-Portrieux Congress Center, Marie-Thérèse Auffray, painter and resistant 1912–1990.
- 2018: Retrospective at the Hôtel du Département de l'Orne in Alençon.

== Public tributes ==
- Marie-Thérèse Auffray Park, a public garden, was inaugurated in 2019 in the 14th arrondissement of Paris, in the district where the artist had her studio and gallery.
