= Planches =

- Commune
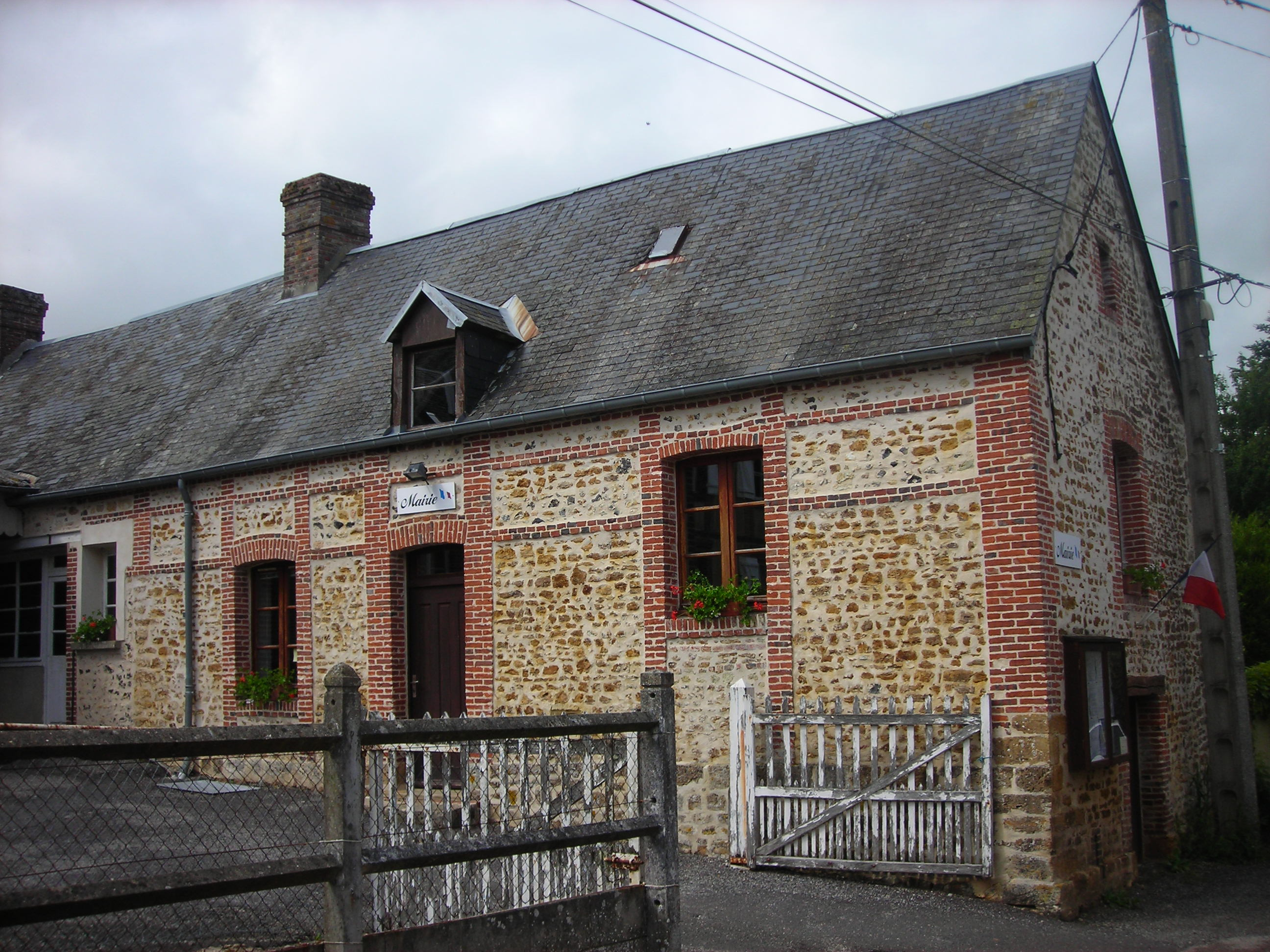
- The town hall in Planches
- Location of Planches
- Location within France Location within Normandy
- Coordinates: 48°42′09″N 0°22′17″E
- Country: France
- Region: Normandy
- Department: Orne
- Arrondissement: Mortagne-au-Perche
- Canton: Rai
- Intercommunality: Vallées d'Auge et du Merlerault

Government
  - Mayor (2020–2026): Gérard Préel
- Area^{1}: 12.49 km^{2} (4.82 sq mi)
- Elevation: 257 m (843 ft)
- Highest elevation: 308 m (1,010 ft)
- Lowest elevation: 239 m (784 ft)
- Population (2023): 180
  - Density: 14/km^{2} (37/sq mi)
- Time zone: UTC+01:00 (CET)
  - Summer (DST): UTC+02:00 (CEST)
- INSEE/Postal code: 61330 /61370
- ^{1} French Land Register data, which excludes lakes, ponds, glaciers > 1 km^{2} (0.386 sq mi or 247 acres) and river estuaries.

Planches (French pronunciation: [plɑ̃ʃ]) is a commune in the Orne department in north-western France.

== Geography ==
The commune is made up of the following collection of villages and hamlets, Le Bois Brunel, Planches, Ménil Gautier and Saint-Vandrille.

The Commune is one of twenty-seven communes that make up the Natura 2000 protected area of Bocages et vergers du sud Pays d'Auge.

The source of the river Risle is within this commune. In addition 2 streams traverse the commune Ruisseau du Bois Guimon and Ruisseau du Mesnil Cher.

== See also ==
- Communes of the Orne department
