= Saint-Pierre-des-Loges =

- Commune
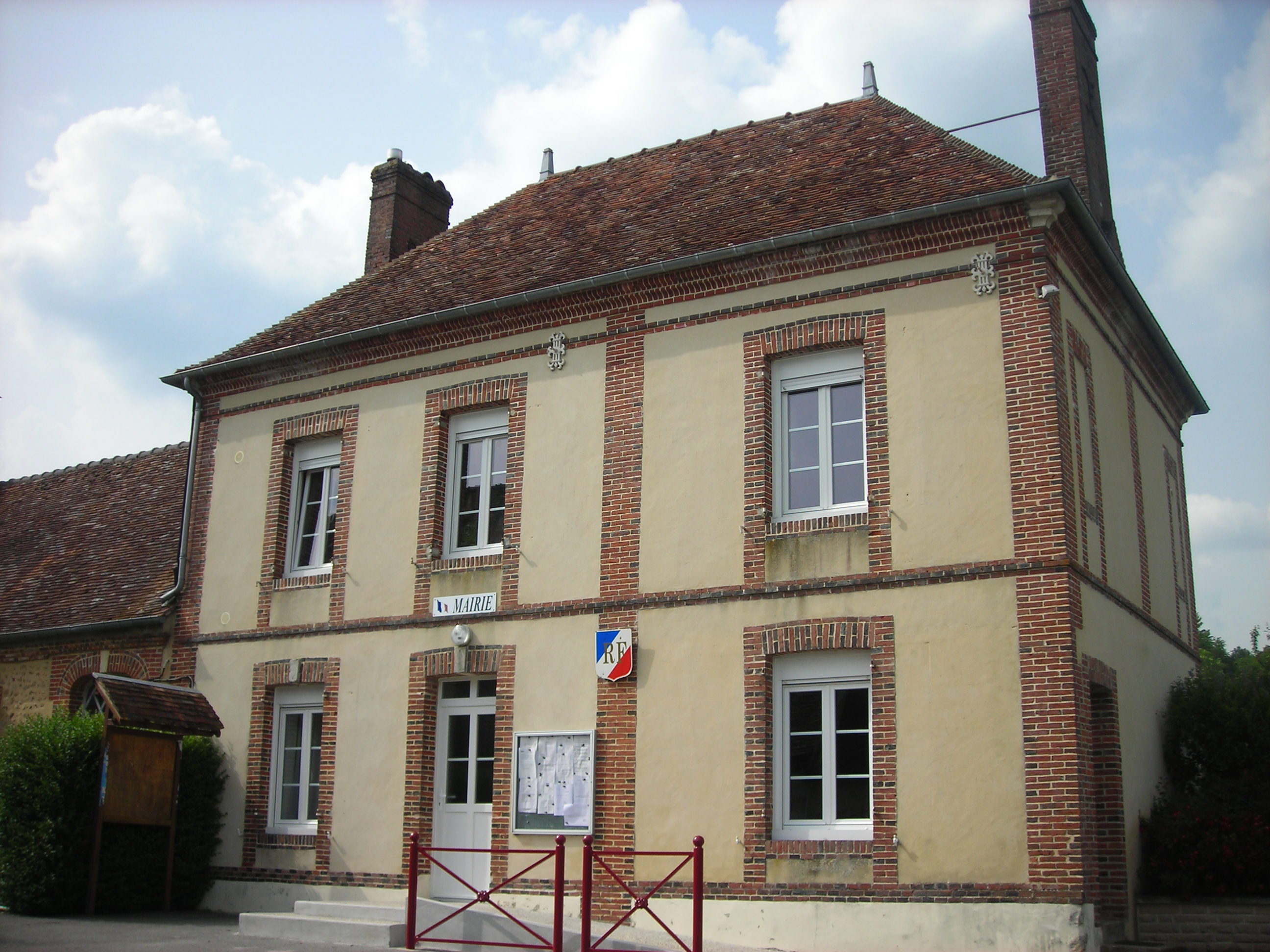
- The town hall in Saint-Pierre-des-Loges

- Coat of arms
- Location of Saint-Pierre-des-Loges
- Location within France Location within Normandy
- Coordinates: 48°45′03″N 0°28′21″E
- Country: France
- Region: Normandy
- Department: Orne
- Arrondissement: Mortagne-au-Perche
- Canton: Rai

Government
  - Mayor (2020–2026): Régis Roland
- Area^{1}: 9.79 km^{2} (3.78 sq mi)
- Elevation: 286 m (938 ft)
- Highest elevation: 319 m (1,047 ft)
- Lowest elevation: 222 m (728 ft)
- Population (2023): 162
  - Density: 16.5/km^{2} (42.9/sq mi)
- Time zone: UTC+01:00 (CET)
  - Summer (DST): UTC+02:00 (CEST)
- INSEE/Postal code: 61446 /61370
- ^{1} French Land Register data, which excludes lakes, ponds, glaciers > 1 km^{2} (0.386 sq mi or 247 acres) and river estuaries.

Saint-Pierre-des-Loges (French pronunciation: [sɛ̃ pjɛʁ de lɔʒ]) is a commune in the Orne department in north-western France.

== Geography ==
The Commune is one of 27 communes that make up the Natura 2000 protected area of Bocages et vergers du sud Pays d'Auge.

The river Risle flows through the commune, plus there is a stream the Ruisseau de Corru.

== See also ==
- Communes of the Orne department
