= La Ferrière-au-Doyen =

- Commune
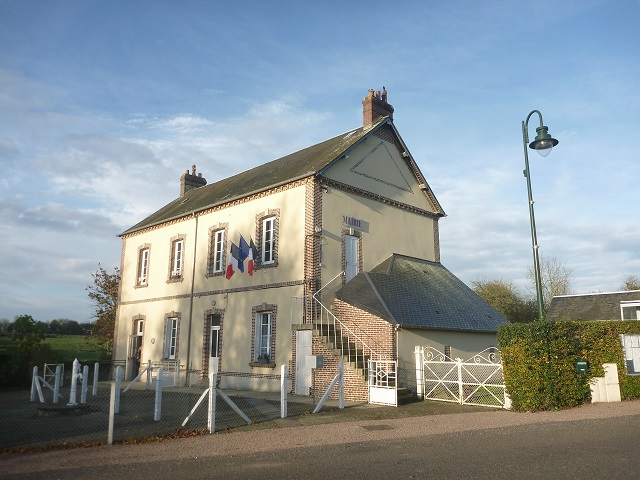
- The town hall in La Ferrière-au-Doyen
- Location of La Ferrière-au-Doyen
- Location within France Location within Normandy
- Coordinates: 48°39′52″N 0°29′59″E
- Country: France
- Region: Normandy
- Department: Orne
- Arrondissement: Mortagne-au-Perche
- Canton: Tourouvre au Perche
- Intercommunality: Pays de L'Aigle

Government
  - Mayor (2020–2026): Pascal Suard
- Area^{1}: 22.47 km^{2} (8.68 sq mi)
- Elevation: 265 m (869 ft)
- Highest elevation: 312 m (1,024 ft)
- Lowest elevation: 214 m (702 ft)
- Population (2023): 157
  - Density: 6.99/km^{2} (18.1/sq mi)
- Time zone: UTC+01:00 (CET)
  - Summer (DST): UTC+02:00 (CEST)
- INSEE/Postal code: 61162 /61380
- ^{1} French Land Register data, which excludes lakes, ponds, glaciers > 1 km^{2} (0.386 sq mi or 247 acres) and river estuaries.

La Ferrière-au-Doyen (French pronunciation: [la fɛʁjɛʁ o dwajɛ̃]) is a commune in the Orne department in north-western France.

== Geography ==
La Ferrière-au-Doyen is made up of the following collection of villages and hamlets, La Faisanderie, La Ferrière-au-Doyen and La Grimonnière.

The Commune is one of 27 communes that make up the Natura 2000 protected area of Bocages et vergers du sud Pays d'Auge.

Two rivers, the Iton and Le Vivier Tranchant flow through the commune. In addition a stream, Ruisseau de la Gaziniere also passes through the commune.

== See also ==
- Communes of the Orne department
