= Canton of Rai =

Coordinates: 48.75°N 0.58°E

The canton of Rai is an administrative division of the Orne department, northwestern France. It was created at the French canton reorganisation which came into effect in March 2015. Its seat is in Rai.

It consists of the following communes:

1. Aube
2. Beaufai
3. Champ-Haut
4. Échauffour
5. Écorcei
6. Fay
7. La Ferté-en-Ouche
8. La Gonfrière
9. Lignères
10. Mahéru
11. Ménil-Froger
12. Le Ménil-Vicomte
13. Merlerault-le-Pin
14. Planches
15. Rai
16. Sainte-Gauburge-Sainte-Colombe
17. Saint-Evroult-Notre-Dame-du-Bois
18. Saint-Germain-de-Clairefeuille
19. Saint-Nicolas-de-Sommaire
20. Saint-Pierre-des-Loges
21. Saint-Symphorien-des-Bruyères
22. Touquettes
