= Échauffour =

- Commune
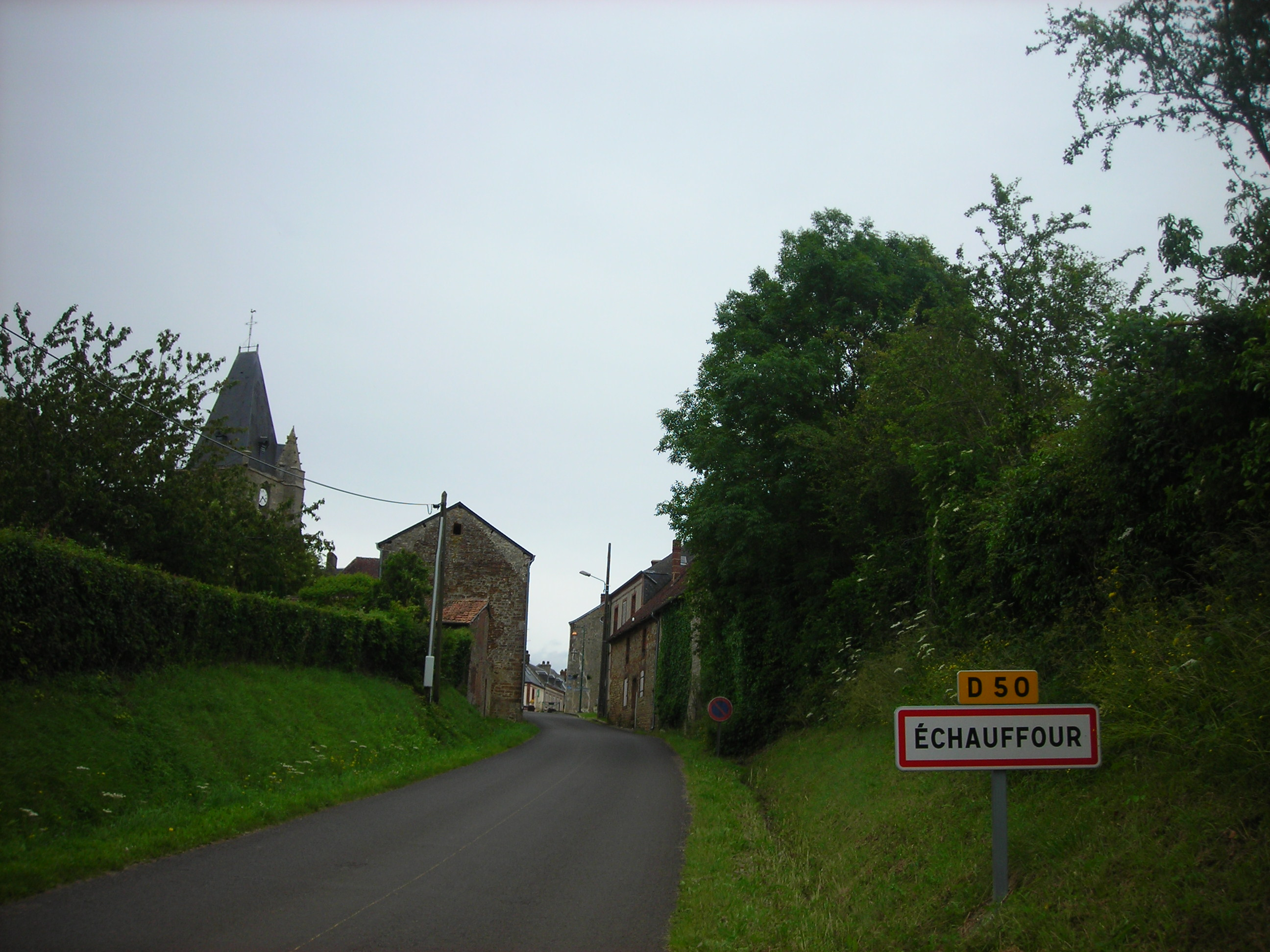
- Village entrance
- Location of Échauffour
- Location within France Location within Normandy
- Coordinates: 48°44′29″N 0°23′19″E
- Country: France
- Region: Normandy
- Department: Orne
- Arrondissement: Mortagne-au-Perche
- Canton: Rai
- Intercommunality: Vallées d'Auge et du Merlerault

Government
  - Mayor (2020–2026): Didier Duvaldestin
- Area^{1}: 33.14 km^{2} (12.80 sq mi)
- Elevation: 281 m (922 ft)
- Highest elevation: 331 m (1,086 ft)
- Lowest elevation: 223 m (732 ft)
- Population (2023): 717
  - Density: 21.6/km^{2} (56.0/sq mi)
- Time zone: UTC+01:00 (CET)
  - Summer (DST): UTC+02:00 (CEST)
- INSEE/Postal code: 61150 /61370
- ^{1} French Land Register data, which excludes lakes, ponds, glaciers > 1 km^{2} (0.386 sq mi or 247 acres) and river estuaries.

Échauffour (French pronunciation: [eʃofuʁ]) is a commune in the Orne department in north-western France.

== Geography ==
The commune is on the borders of the country of Ouche and the campaign of Alençon. Its village is 4.5 km northwest of Sainte-Gauburge-Sainte-Colombe, 9 km north-east of Merlerault, 11 km south-east of Gacé and 20 km west of L'Aigle.

Échauffour is made up of the following collection of villages and hamlets, Les Déserts, Verdain, Le Gros Chêne, Échauffour, Le Fresne, La Thirardière, Fumeçon, La Gervisière, Launay des Haies and Le Choisel.

Covering 3,314 hectares, the territory of Échauffour is the largest in the canton of Merlerault.

The Commune is one of 27 communes that make up the Natura 2000 protected area of Bocages et vergers du sud Pays d'Auge.

The river Risle flows through the commune. In addition the Touques river flows through the commune. In addition 4 streams traverse the commune, Ruisseau du Vieux Bourg, Ruisseau du Choisel, Ruisseau du Bois Guimon and Ruisseau du Mesnil Cher.

== Name ==
The name of the locality is attested in the forms Escalfo in 1050 and Scalfou around 1053. The toponym would be linked to the presence of lime kilns: ès chaufours (former French: "in the lime kilns"). It can also be derived from the old French cracked ("split, burst") crazy ("beech").

The residents are called Échauffouriens in French.

== Population ==
Historical population
Year	Pop.	±% p.a.
1968	1,005	—
1975	1,005	+0.00%
1982	836	−2.60%
1990	735	−1.60%
1999	764	+0.43%
2007	770	+0.10%
2012	737	−0.87%
2017	742	+0.14%
2023	717	−0.57%
Source: INSEE

== Places and monuments ==
- St. Andrew's Church.
- The castle built around the year 1000, by Helgon, after attribution of the estate by Richard II of Normandy and belonging to the Giroie family by marriage until the 14th century, is replaced in the 15th century by a fortified house. The house is remodeled and enlarged in the 18th century. The 18th century farmhouse was remodeled in the 19th century. 15th century chapel.
- At a place called Old town, the castle of the eighteenth where resided the Marquis de Sade. No plaque indicates this stay.
- The three menhirs of Crouttes classified as a Monument historique. A dolmen is also present at Les Brossettes.

Churches St. Andrew (fifteenth century), former Benedictine priory, and St. Germain (fifteenth century). Both buildings house many works classified as objects to the Historical Monuments.

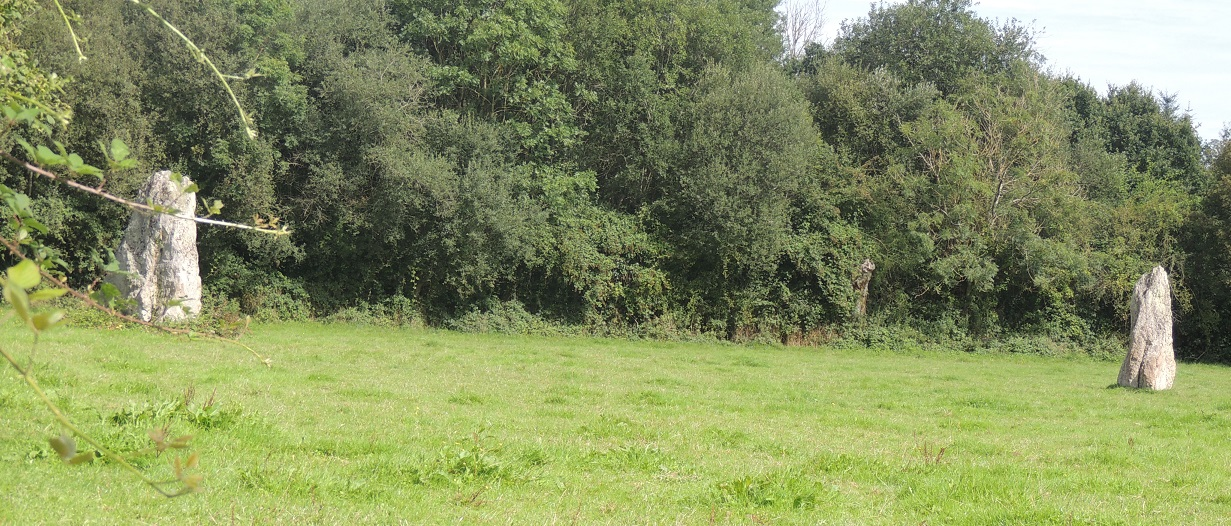
2 of 3 menhirs des Crouttes

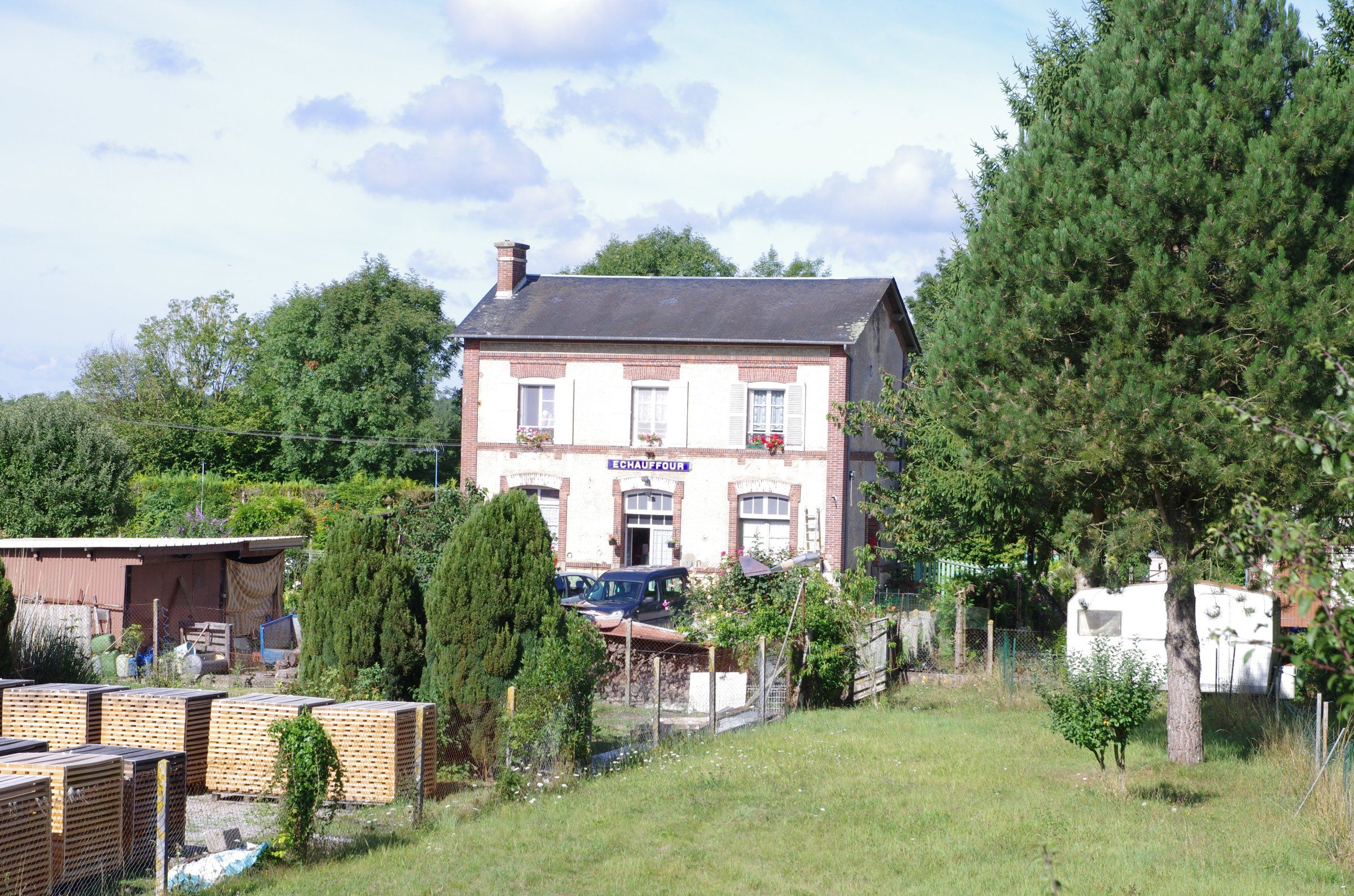
Gare Échauffour

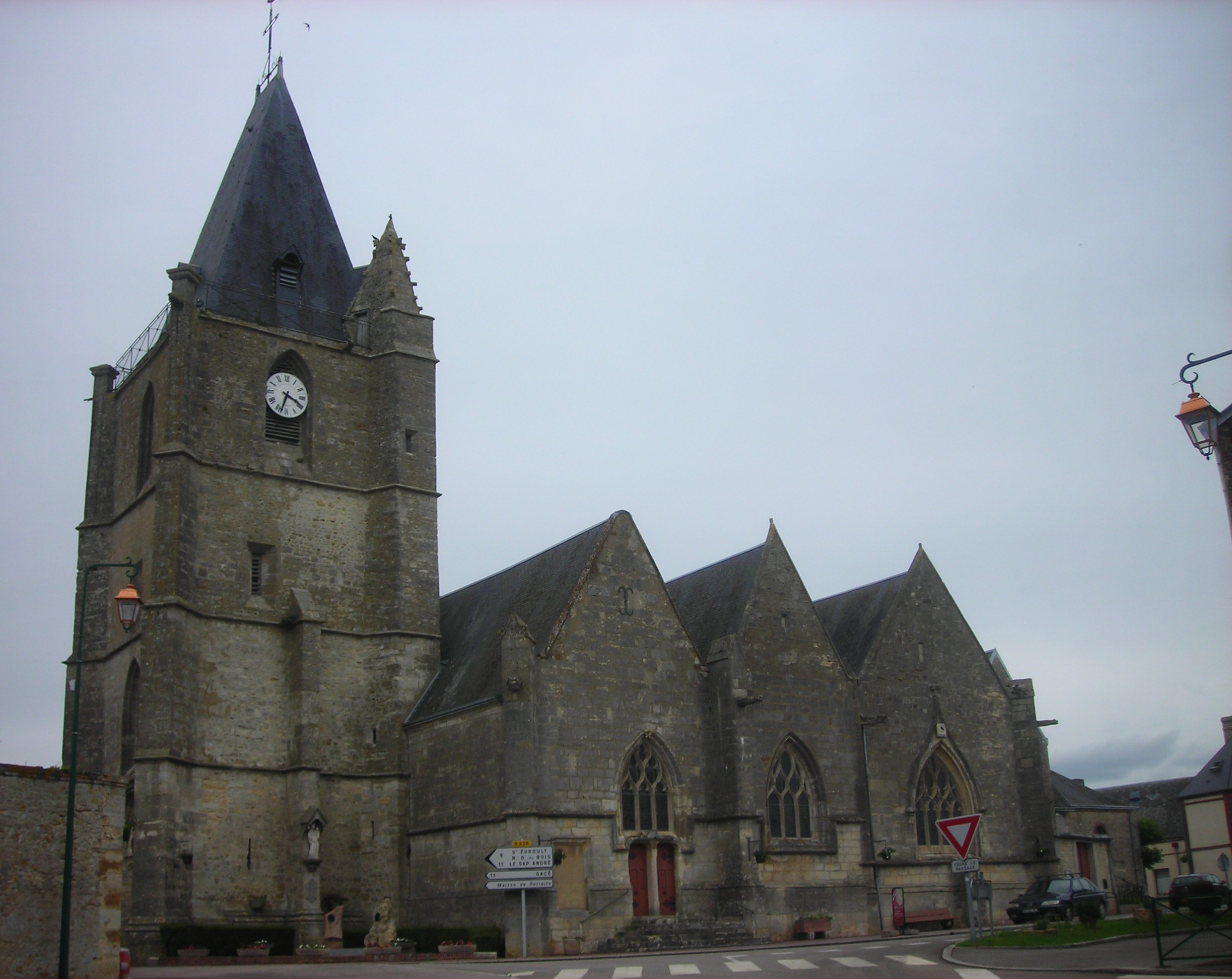
St Andrews church

== Sports ==
The Échauffour Sports Union has made a football team evolve into a district division until 2012.

== Personalities linked to the commune ==
In 1763, following a first scandal, the case Jeanne Testard, the Marquis de Sade is under house arrest for four months at the castle d'Échauffour, property of his father-in-law, Claude-René de Montreuil, president of the court of the aides of Paris. The Marquise de Sade, Renée-Pélagie de Montreuil, after her separation from the Marquis in 1790, resided in the castle with her daughter for most of the year until her death in 1810. One can still read their names engraved on the tombstone, in the small cemetery of the village.

- Paul Harel (1854 to Échauffour - 1927), poet, innkeeper and man of the press.
- Denise d'Échauffour, abbess of the abbey to the Ladies of Caen from 1141 to 1160.
- Marie-Thérèse Auffray (1912-1990 to Échauffour), artist and member of the French resistance during WWII.

== See also ==
- Communes of the Orne department
