= Ménil-Froger =

- Commune
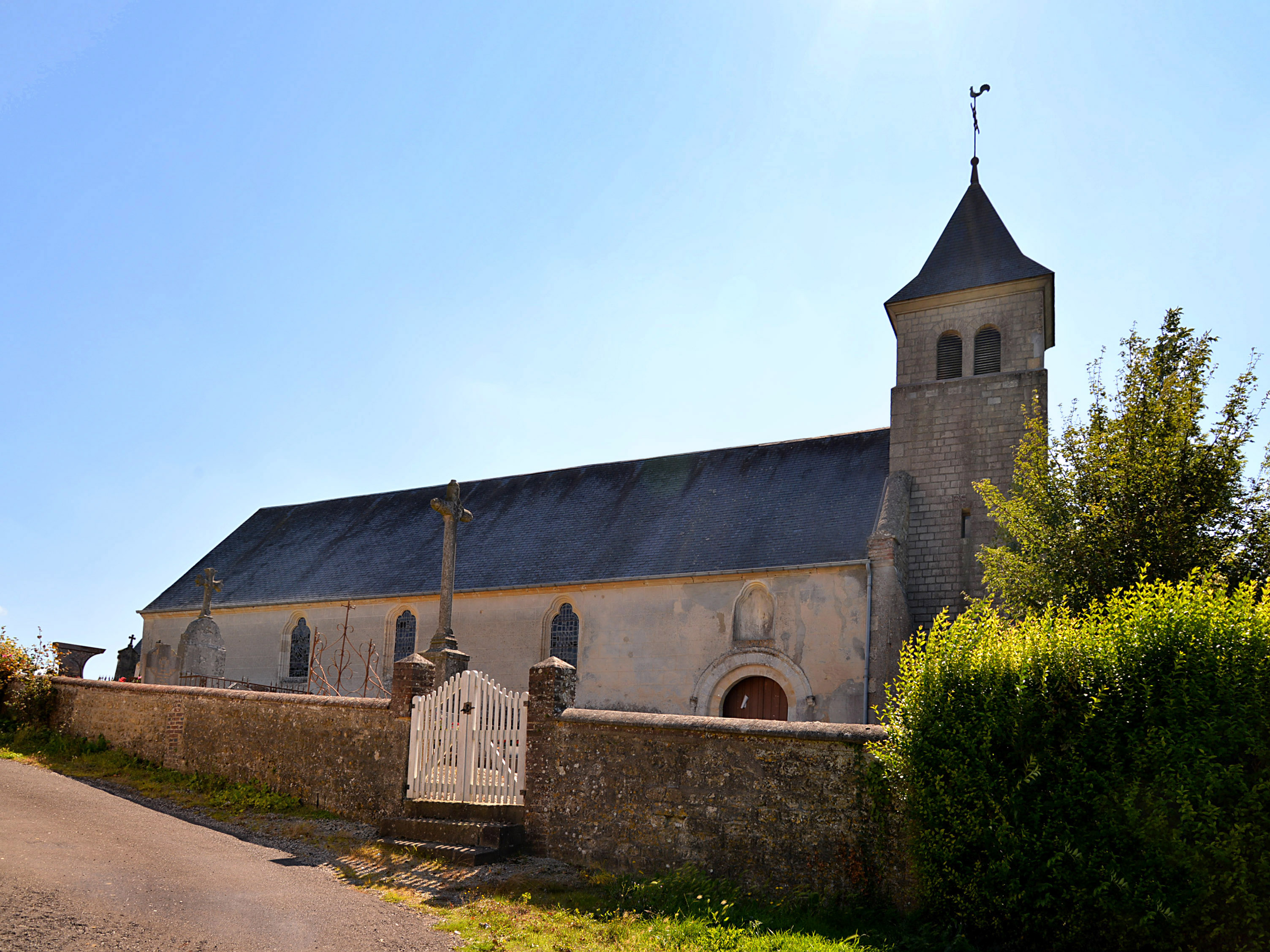
- The church in Ménil-Froger
- Location of Ménil-Froger
- Location within France Location within Normandy
- Coordinates: 48°43′58″N 0°16′13″E
- Country: France
- Region: Normandy
- Department: Orne
- Arrondissement: Mortagne-au-Perche
- Canton: Rai
- Intercommunality: Vallées d'Auge et du Merlerault

Government
  - Mayor (2020–2026): Isabelle Beaudoin
- Area^{1}: 5.31 km^{2} (2.05 sq mi)
- Elevation: 258 m (846 ft)
- Highest elevation: 288 m (945 ft)
- Lowest elevation: 199 m (653 ft)
- Population (2023): 63
  - Density: 12/km^{2} (31/sq mi)
- Time zone: UTC+01:00 (CET)
  - Summer (DST): UTC+02:00 (CEST)
- INSEE/Postal code: 61264 /61240
- ^{1} French Land Register data, which excludes lakes, ponds, glaciers > 1 km^{2} (0.386 sq mi or 247 acres) and river estuaries.

Ménil-Froger (French pronunciation: [menil fʁɔɡe]) is a commune in the Orne department in north-western France.

== Geography ==
The commune is made up of the following collection of villages and hamlets, Le Brûle,La Croix Fanchon, La Bessière and Ménil-Froger.

The Commune is one of 27 communes that make up the Natura 2000 protected area of Bocages et vergers du sud Pays d'Auge.

The commune has two rivers, Dieuge and Ure flowing through its borders, plus a stream, The Bouillonnay.

== Places of interest ==
=== National heritage sites ===
Logis de Ménil-Froger a 15th century manor house that was listed as a Monument historique in 2000.

== See also ==
- Communes of the Orne department
