= Mahéru =

- Commune
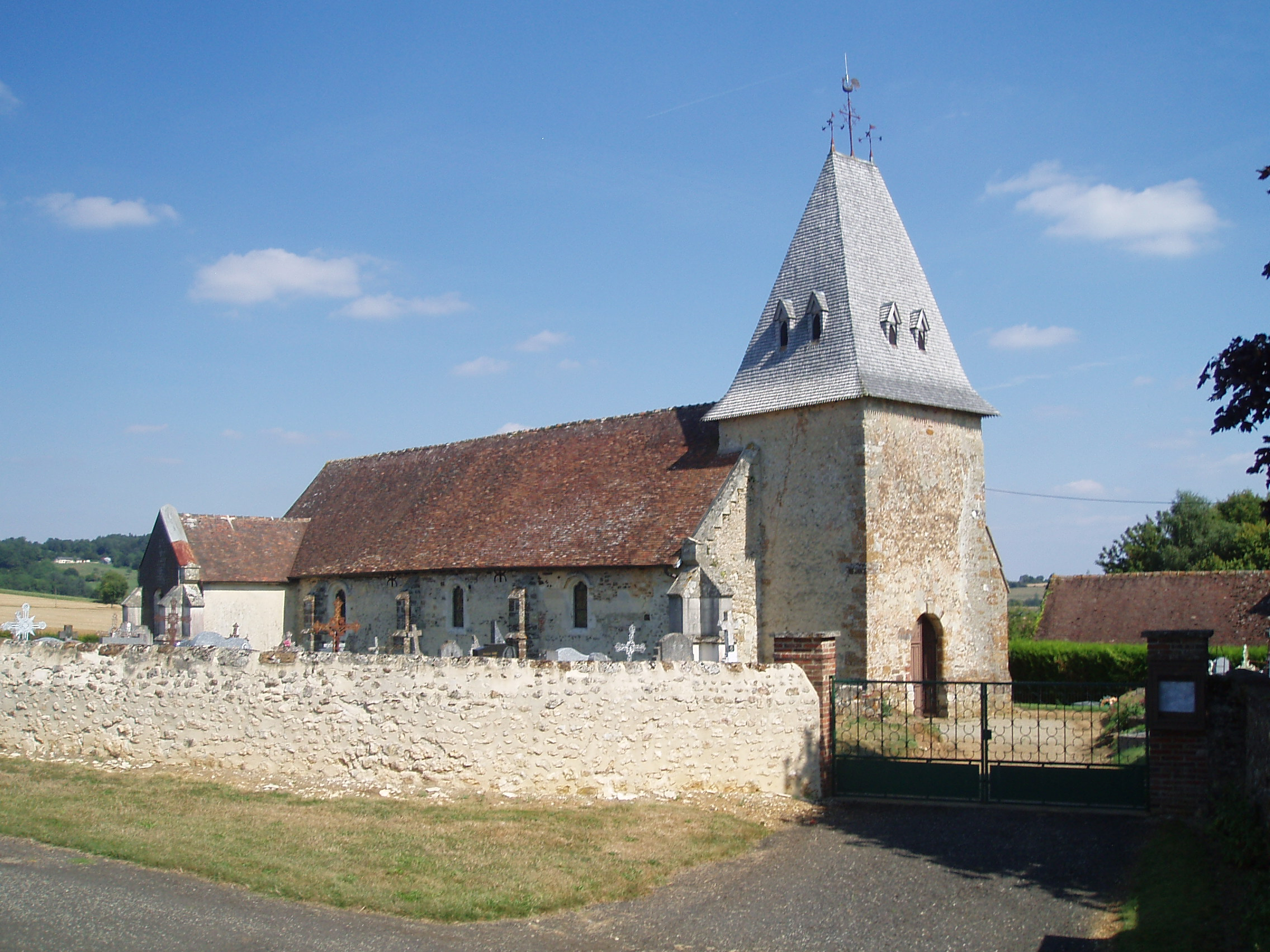
- The church in Mahéru
- Location of Mahéru
- Location within France Location within Normandy
- Coordinates: 48°39′29″N 0°25′59″E
- Country: France
- Region: Normandy
- Department: Orne
- Arrondissement: Mortagne-au-Perche
- Canton: Rai
- Intercommunality: Pays de L'Aigle

Government
  - Mayor (2020–2026): François Hurel
- Area^{1}: 19.63 km^{2} (7.58 sq mi)
- Elevation: 277 m (909 ft)
- Highest elevation: 314 m (1,030 ft)
- Lowest elevation: 172 m (564 ft)
- Population (2023): 278
  - Density: 14.2/km^{2} (36.7/sq mi)
- Time zone: UTC+01:00 (CET)
  - Summer (DST): UTC+02:00 (CEST)
- INSEE/Postal code: 61244 /61380
- ^{1} French Land Register data, which excludes lakes, ponds, glaciers > 1 km^{2} (0.386 sq mi or 247 acres) and river estuaries.

Mahéru (French pronunciation: [ma.eʁy]) is a commune in the Orne department in north-western France.

== Geography ==
This commune is made up of the following collection of villages and hamlets, Francheville, Les Brosses, La Tonnellé, La Moinerie, La Gaubergerie, La Queurie, Mahéru and La Bretonnière.

The Commune is one of 27 communes that make up the Natura 2000 protected area of Bocages et vergers du sud Pays d'Auge.

In addition the commune along with another 32 communes is part of another Natura 2000 conservation area, called the Haute vallée de la Sarthe.

The Sarthe river flows through the commune. Another two rivers, the Iton and Le Fay also flows through the commune. In addition a stream, Ruisseau de la Gaziniere also passes through the commune.

== See also ==
- Communes of the Orne department
