= Croisilles, Orne =

Croisilles
- Commune
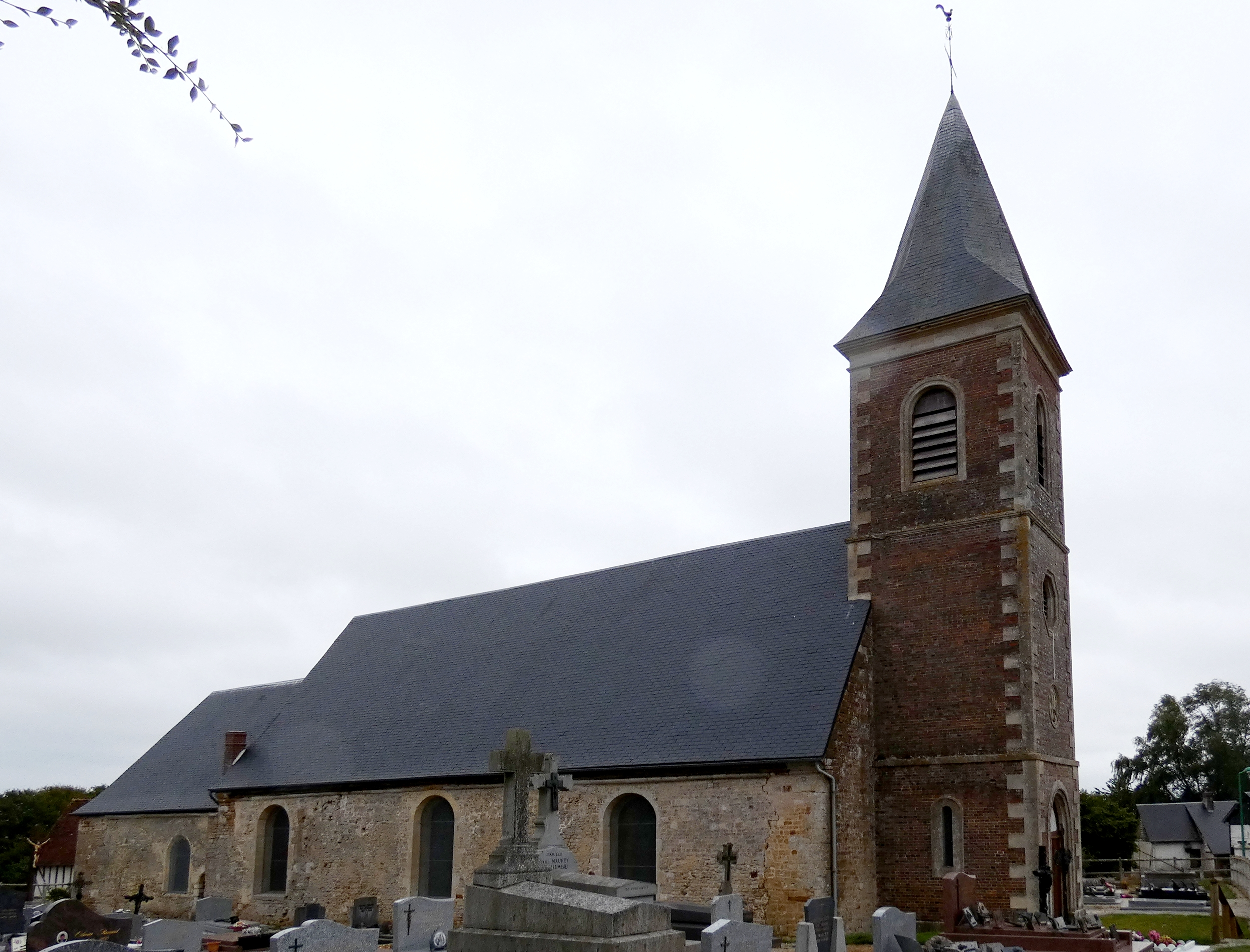
- Location of Croisilles
- Location within France Location within Normandy
- Coordinates: 48°46′07″N 0°15′48″E
- Country: France
- Region: Normandy
- Department: Orne
- Arrondissement: Mortagne-au-Perche
- Canton: Vimoutiers
- Intercommunality: Vallées d'Auge et du Merlerault

Government
  - Mayor (2020–2026): Monique Trinité
- Area^{1}: 11.32 km^{2} (4.37 sq mi)
- Elevation: 250 m (820 ft)
- Highest elevation: 303 m (994 ft)
- Lowest elevation: 186 m (610 ft)
- Population (2023): 184
  - Density: 16.3/km^{2} (42.1/sq mi)
- Time zone: UTC+01:00 (CET)
  - Summer (DST): UTC+02:00 (CEST)
- INSEE/Postal code: 61138 /61230
- ^{1} French Land Register data, which excludes lakes, ponds, glaciers > 1 km^{2} (0.386 sq mi or 247 acres) and river estuaries.

Croisilles (French pronunciation: [kʁwazij]) is a commune in the Orne department in north-western France.

== Geography ==
The commune is made up of the following collection of villages and hamlets, Bellefontaine, La Rousselière and Croisilles.

The Commune is one of 27 communes that make up the Natura 2000 protected area of Bocages et vergers du sud Pays d'Auge.

The commune has two rivers, the Touques and the Ure flowing through the commune. In addition to the two rivers there are 6 streams running through the commune, the Launay, the Bouillonnay, the Veaulecent, the Menil, La Noe and the Bouillant.

== See also ==
- Communes of the Orne department
