= La Gonfrière =

- Commune
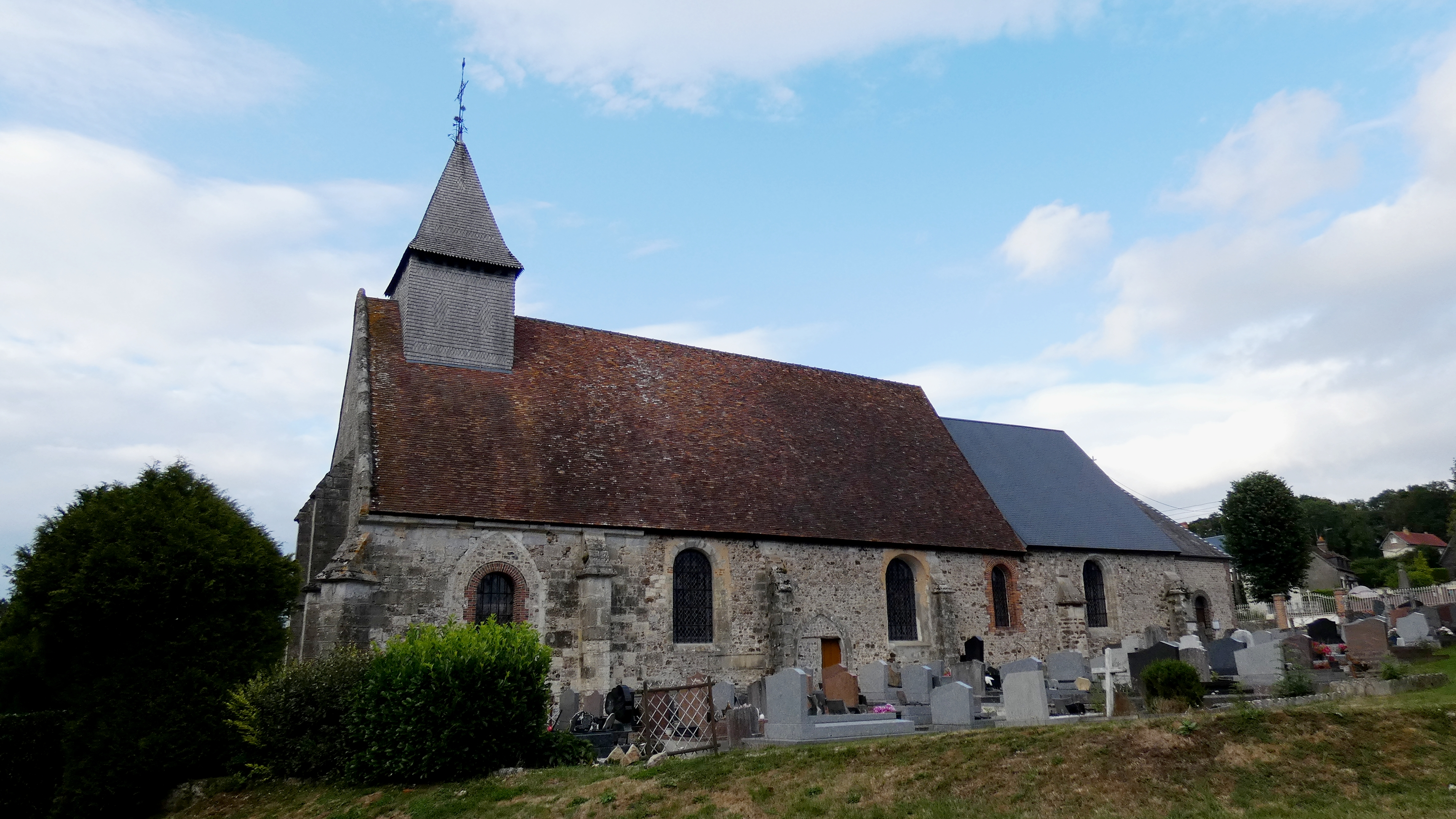
- Location of La Gonfrière
- Location within France Location within Normandy
- Coordinates: 48°49′12″N 0°28′21″E
- Country: France
- Region: Normandy
- Department: Orne
- Arrondissement: Mortagne-au-Perche
- Canton: Rai
- Intercommunality: Pays de L'Aigle

Government
  - Mayor (2020–2026): Nadège Trouillet
- Area^{1}: 12.83 km^{2} (4.95 sq mi)
- Elevation: 221 m (725 ft)
- Highest elevation: 292 m (958 ft)
- Lowest elevation: 202 m (663 ft)
- Population (2023): 271
  - Density: 21.1/km^{2} (54.7/sq mi)
- Time zone: UTC+01:00 (CET)
  - Summer (DST): UTC+02:00 (CEST)
- INSEE/Postal code: 61193 /61550
- ^{1} French Land Register data, which excludes lakes, ponds, glaciers > 1 km^{2} (0.386 sq mi or 247 acres) and river estuaries.

La Gonfrière (French pronunciation: [la ɡɔ̃fʁijɛʁ]) is a commune in the Orne department in north-western France.

== Geography ==
La Gonfrière is made up of the following collection of villages and hamlets, Les Greniers, Les Hauts Coureurs, La Gonfrière, Le Pommier-Fal, Le Souchet, Le Chesnay, Le Chaloué and La Martelière.

Two rivers the Touquettes and Charentonne in addition a stream, Ruisseau de Brequigny stream all flow through the commune.

== See also ==
- Communes of the Orne department
