= Résenlieu =

- Commune
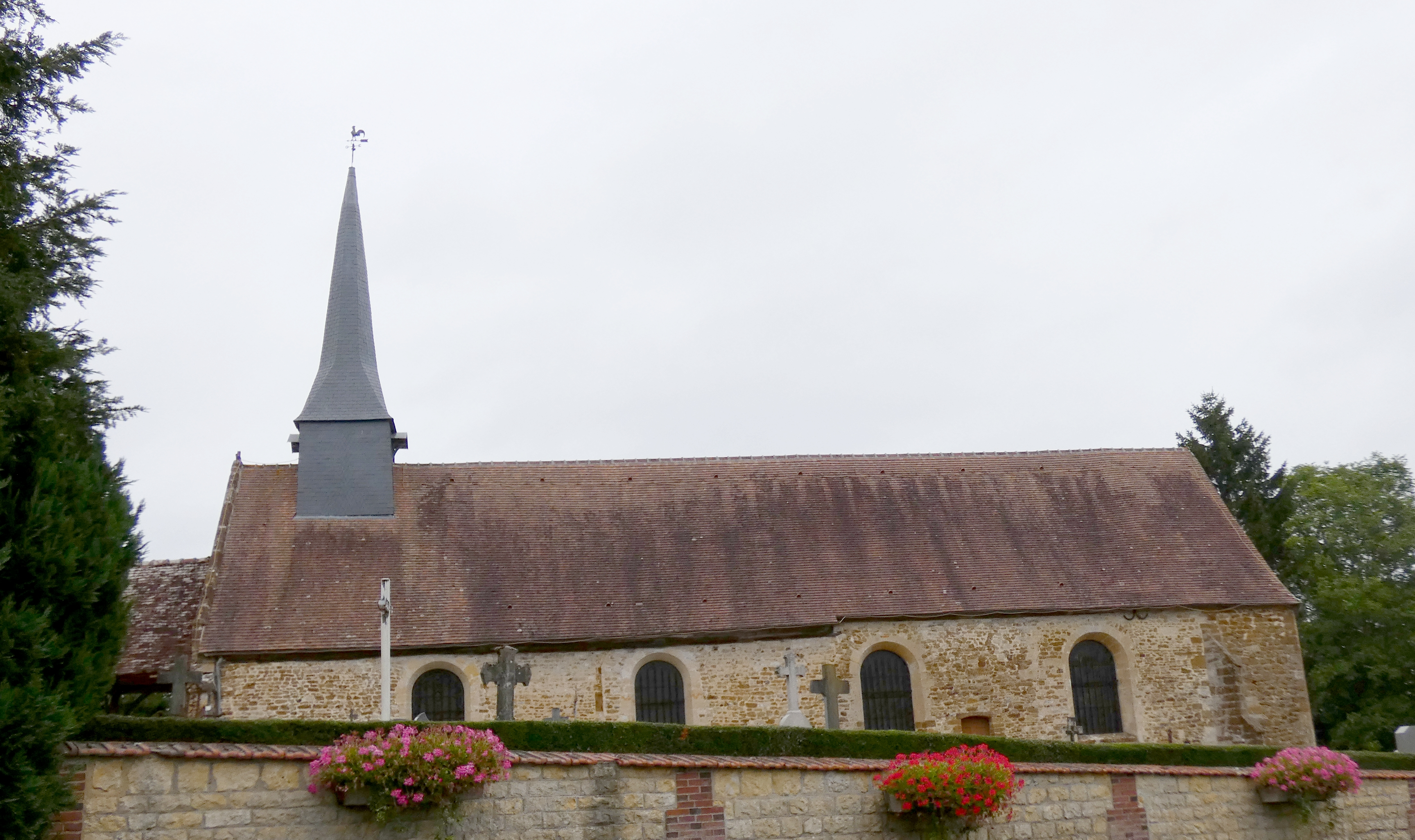
- Location of Résenlieu
- Location within France Location within Normandy
- Coordinates: 48°47′45″N 0°17′16″E
- Country: France
- Region: Normandy
- Department: Orne
- Arrondissement: Mortagne-au-Perche
- Canton: Vimoutiers
- Intercommunality: Vallées d'Auge et du Merlerault

Government
  - Mayor (2025–2026): Philippe Tirard
- Area^{1}: 5.09 km^{2} (1.97 sq mi)
- Elevation: 300 m (980 ft)
- Highest elevation: 296 m (971 ft)
- Lowest elevation: 178 m (584 ft)
- Population (2023): 171
  - Density: 33.6/km^{2} (87.0/sq mi)
- Time zone: UTC+01:00 (CET)
  - Summer (DST): UTC+02:00 (CEST)
- INSEE/Postal code: 61347 /61230
- ^{1} French Land Register data, which excludes lakes, ponds, glaciers > 1 km^{2} (0.386 sq mi or 247 acres) and river estuaries.

Résenlieu (French pronunciation: [ʁezɑ̃ljø]) is a commune in the Orne department in north-western France.

== Geography ==
The commune is made up of the following collection of villages and hamlets, Les Houlettes, Le Vieux Résenlieu and Résenlieu.

The Commune is one of 27 communes that make up the Natura 2000 protected area of Bocages et vergers du sud Pays d'Auge.

The commune has one river, The Touques and a single stream, the Bouillant running through its borders.

== See also ==
- Communes of the Orne department
