= Orgères, Orne =

Orgères
- Commune
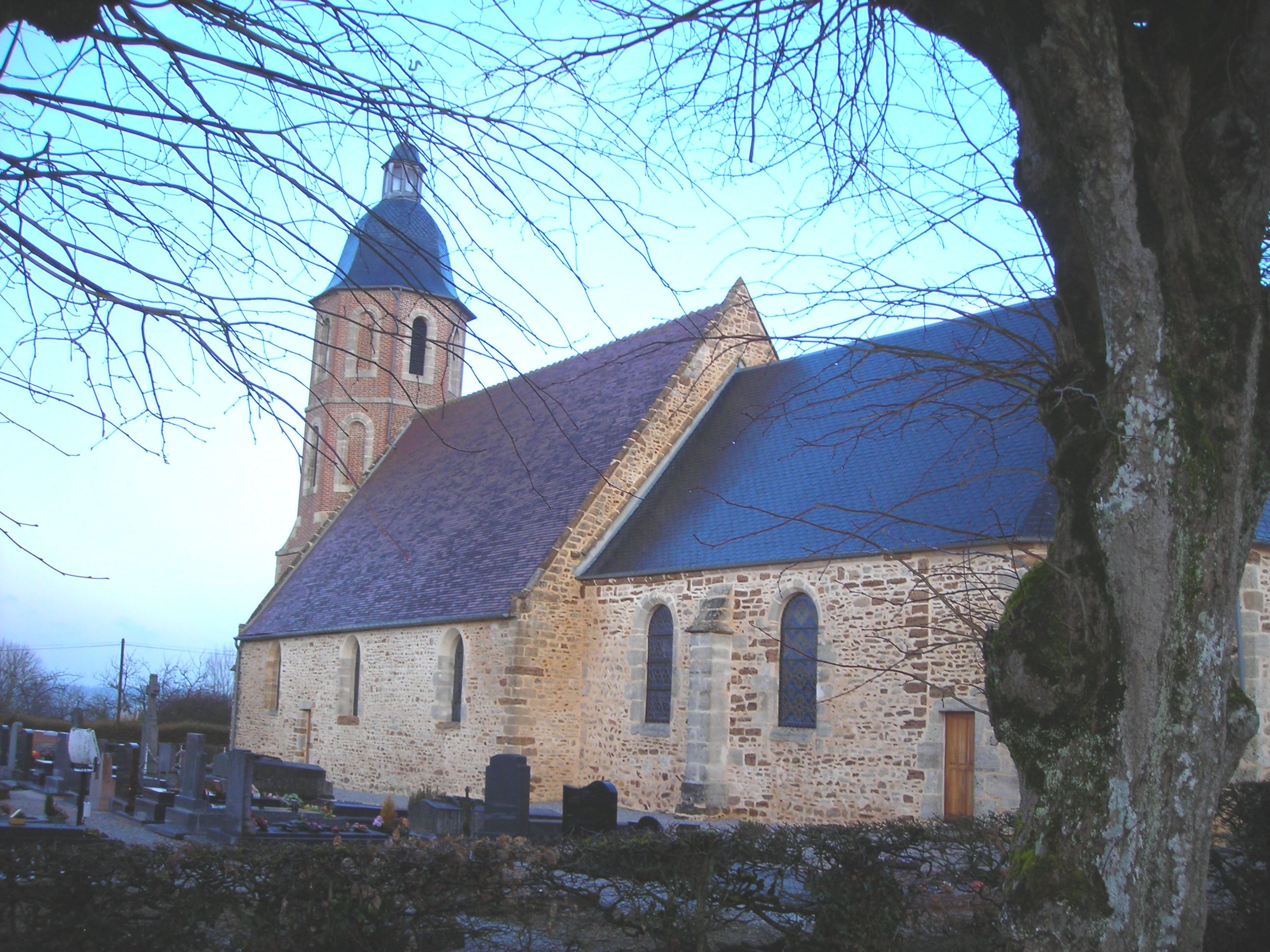
- The church in Orgères
- Location of Orgères
- Location within France Location within Normandy
- Coordinates: 48°45′51″N 0°20′32″E
- Country: France
- Region: Normandy
- Department: Orne
- Arrondissement: Mortagne-au-Perche
- Canton: Vimoutiers
- Intercommunality: Vallées d'Auge et du Merlerault

Government
  - Mayor (2020–2026): Jean-Pierre Féret
- Area^{1}: 12.04 km^{2} (4.65 sq mi)
- Elevation: 209 m (686 ft)
- Highest elevation: 326 m (1,070 ft)
- Lowest elevation: 198 m (650 ft)
- Population (2023): 180
  - Density: 15/km^{2} (39/sq mi)
- Time zone: UTC+01:00 (CET)
  - Summer (DST): UTC+02:00 (CEST)
- INSEE/Postal code: 61317 /61230
- ^{1} French Land Register data, which excludes lakes, ponds, glaciers > 1 km^{2} (0.386 sq mi or 247 acres) and river estuaries.

Orgères (French pronunciation: [ɔʁʒɛʁ]) is a commune in the Orne department in north-western France.

== Geography ==
The commune is made up of the following collection of villages and hamlets, Les Basses Forges, La Vieillerie, Moncereaux, Le Hamel, Orgères, Closomer and La Fleurière.

The Commune is one of 27 communes that make up the Natura 2000 protected area of Bocages et vergers du sud Pays d'Auge.

The Touques, and the La Maure flows through the commune. In addition there are two streams here, Ruisseau du Vivier and Ruisseau de Fontaine Bouillante.

== See also ==
- Communes of the Orne department
