= Canton of L'Aigle-Est =

Coordinates: 48°44′29″N 0°40′58″E

L'Aigle-Est
- Former canton
- Interactive map of L'Aigle-Est
- Country: France
- Region: Normandy
- Department: Orne
- No. of communes: {{{nbcomm}}}
- Disbanded: 2015
- Area: 127.74 km^{2} (49.32 sq mi)
- Population (2012): 9,171
  - Density: 71.79/km^{2} (185.9/sq mi)

The canton of L'Aigle-Est is a former canton of France, located in the Orne department, in the Basse-Normandie region. It was disbanded following the French canton reorganisation which came into effect in March 2015. It had 9 communes.

== Communes ==
The communes of the canton of L'Aigle-Est were:

1. L'Aigle (partly)
2. Chandai
3. Crulai
4. Irai
5. Saint-Martin-d'Écublei
6. Saint-Michel-Tuboeuf
7. Saint-Ouen-sur-Iton
8. Saint-Sulpice-sur-Risle
9. Vitrai-sous-Laigle

== See also ==
- Cantons of the Orne department
