= Vitrai-sous-Laigle =

- Commune
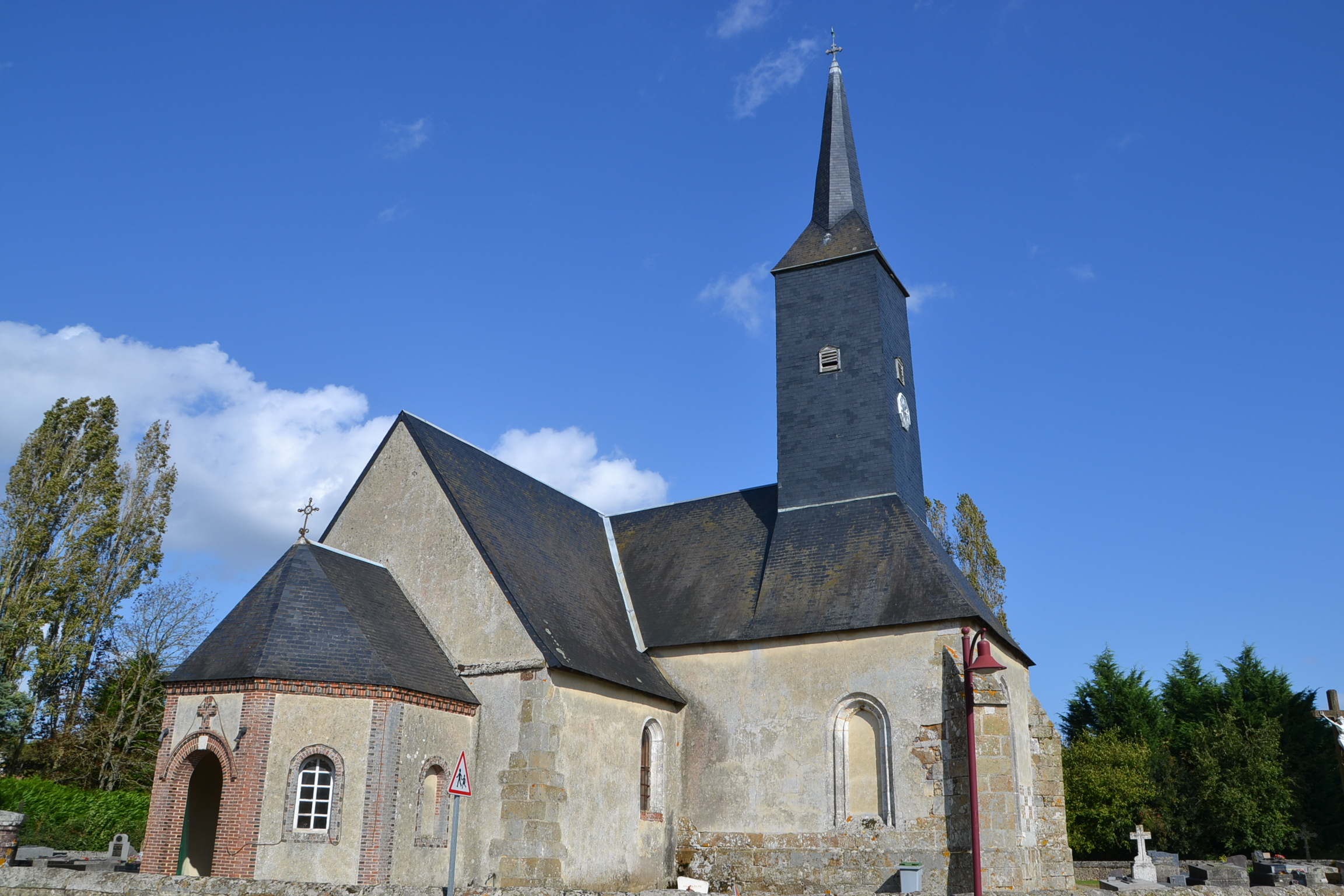
- Location of Vitrai-sous-Laigle
- Location within France Location within Normandy
- Coordinates: 48°43′01″N 0°42′38″E
- Country: France
- Region: Normandy
- Department: Orne
- Arrondissement: Mortagne-au-Perche
- Canton: L'Aigle
- Intercommunality: Pays de l'Aigle

Government
  - Mayor (2020–2026): François Carbonell
- Area^{1}: 11.33 km^{2} (4.37 sq mi)
- Elevation: 231 m (758 ft)
- Highest elevation: 237 m (778 ft)
- Lowest elevation: 199 m (653 ft)
- Population (2023): 209
  - Density: 18.4/km^{2} (47.8/sq mi)
- Time zone: UTC+01:00 (CET)
  - Summer (DST): UTC+02:00 (CEST)
- INSEE/Postal code: 61510 /61300
- ^{1} French Land Register data, which excludes lakes, ponds, glaciers > 1 km^{2} (0.386 sq mi or 247 acres) and river estuaries.

Vitrai-sous-Laigle (French pronunciation: [vitʁɛ su lɛgl], literally Vitrai under Laigle) is a commune in the Orne department in north-western France.

It is located 70 km north west of Chartres and 53 km south west of Evreux. It takes its name from the town of l'Aigle, 8 km to the north west.

== See also ==
Communes of the Orne department
