= Léon-Eugène Méhédin =

French architect, archaeologist and photographer (1828–1905)

- Born: February 21, 1828; L'Aigle
- Died: March 14, 1905 (aged 77); Bonsecours
- Known for: archaeologist , architect and photographer

Léon-Eugène Méhédin (21 February 1828, L'Aigle – 4 March 1905, Bonsecours) was a French archaeologist, architect and photographer.

Méhédin's was a fervent Bonapartist and his career was greatly facilitated when he erected two triumphal arches in L'Aigle in 1851 to celebrate Napoléon III's French coup of that year. In 1855, he designed Civitavecchia's train station and went on a mission of photo reconnaissance to the Crimean War with Jean-Charles Langlois.

In 1859, he drew a portrait of Napoleon III. He compiled an archaeological album on Egypt. In 1865, he photographed the ruins of Xochicalco for the Scientific Commission of Mexico in Paris. He also made a papier-mâché cast of a planned Luxor Obelisk for the Exposition Universelle of 1867 which never came to be when Emperor Maximilian I of Mexico fell in 1867. Some of his collections lay in the Muséum d'Histoire Naturelle de Rouen and others are at the City Library of the same city.

== Honors ==
- Officer of the Imperial Order of Medjidie (1862)
- Officer of the Order of Guadalajara (1866)
- Chevalier de la Légion d'honneur (1867)
- Knight of Saints Maurice and Lazarus (1867)

== Works ==
- Campagne d’Italie en 1859: vues de Magenta, Milan, Melegnano, Dezensano, Valeggio, Villafranca et du pont de Buffalora, [S.l.s.n.], 1859.
- Description de l’Égypte, commencée sous les auspices de Napoléon I^{er}, continuée par ordre de Napoléon III, Paris, Firmin-Didot, 1859.
- Divinité mythique de la mort, à laquelle on offrait les victimes humaines par plusieurs milliers à la fois dans les rites religieux de l’antiquité mexicaine, Paris, Lainé et Havard, 1867.
- Projet de fêtes publiques à Paris, Paris, Bailly, Divry & Cie, 1852.
- Souvenirs de la guerre de Crimée: 29 photographies de Charles Langlois et Léon Méhédin, entre 1855–1856, [S.l.s.n.], 1856.

== Collections ==
- Musée d'Orsay
- Musée de l'Armée
- Bibliothèque nationale de France

== Exhibitions ==
- Bibliothèque municipale de Rouen, 1992

== Sources ==
- Roger Biot, Fameux Rouennais, Rouennais fameux, PTC, Rouen, 2005 ISBN 2-35038-011-4
- Frédéric Gerber, Un Américaniste inconnu, Léon Méhédin: 1828–1905, Paris, DEA, 1991
- Frédéric Gerber, Christian Nicaise, Christian Robichon, Un aventurier du Second Empire: Léon Méhédin 1828–1905, Bibliothèque municipale de Rouen, 1992, 263 p. ISBN 2-901817-24-6
