= François-Émile de Lansac =

French painter (1803–1890)

François-Émile de Lansac (1 October 1803 – 1 April 1890) was a French painter.

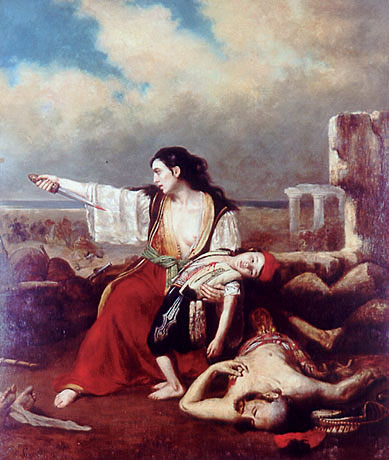
Episode of the siege of Missolonghi (1827). Missolonghi Pinacothèque.

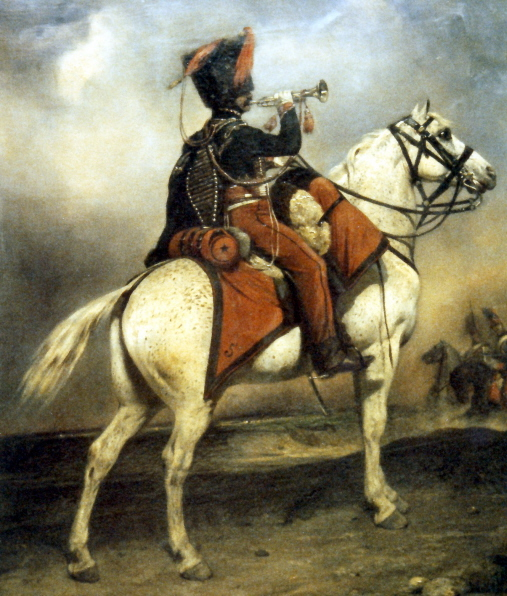
Trumpet of the 5th Hussard Regiment (1837). Musée de l'Armée, Paris, Invalides.

== Life ==
Lansac was descended of a family from Béarn, son of Arnaud de Lansac and Charlotte Émilie Coutures. He was born in Tulle (Corrèze), where his father, an Inspector General of the Treasury, was passing through with his spouse on an inspection. A pupil of Jean-Charles Langlois, a great admirer of Théodore Géricault, Lansac spent several years at the stud farm in Tarbes, studying horses. Back in Paris he collaborated with Ary Scheffer, became his pupil and contributed his talents to many of Scheffer's paintings. On leaving the Scheffer workshop, Lansac specialized in portraits, military scenes and historical subjects. He participated regularly at the Salon des artistes français from 1827 until 1878, was awarded a third-class medal in 1836 and a second class medal in 1838. He was soon placed out of competition. Among his close friends were the contemporary artists Ary Scheffer, Alexandre-Gabriel Decamps, Thomas Couture, Constant Troyon, Henry Scheffer and Alfred de Dreux.

Lansac's former residence, located on 37 Avenue Montaigne, in the 8th arrondissement of Paris, housed until 2017 the visa office of the Canadian Embassy.

He died in Paris in 1890.

== Works ==
His often quoted works are: Episode of the siege of Missolonghi (1827), Equestrian Portrait of Olivier de Clisson (1847), Equestrian Portrait of maréchal de la Palisse (1835), Equestrian Portrait of the Duke of Orléans (1844), Equestrian Portrait of Prince Louis-Napoléon (1850). The Equestrian Portrait of the duc d'Orléans, exhibited at the Salon of 1844, is at the Versailles Museum. The musée de l'Armée at the Invalides in Paris displays his Trumpet of the 5th Hussar Regiment of 1837. The Fine Arts Museum of Bordeaux has two studies of horses by Lansac, a Study of a Bay Horse and a Study of a White Horse. At the National Museum of Compiègne is a work entitled Two Dogs on a Red Marker. The National Museum of Popular Arts and Traditions (Musée national des Arts et Traditions populaires) Paris displays his painting Une Forge purchased by the state at the Salon of 1831. The National Museum of the castles of Versailles and Trianon displays the Portrait équestre du maréchal de la Palisse of 1835.

== Echoes from the Salon des Artistes Français ==
"M. Émile de Lansac has delivered this year only two subjects and two portraits. But let us say that they are placed among the most distinguished works. We find in his easel paintings all the qualities that have put Mr. de Lansac among our best artists, the composition is always cleverly studied, the color is warm and strong and the design brilliant. As for portraits, Mr. de Lansac has managed to draw skilfully the difficulties presented by a character upon which the caricature pencil had so often been exercised."

In 1840, Jean-François Destigny wrote in Revue Poétique du Salon de 1840 about Lansac's painting entitled Mort du lieutenant général comte de Damrémont, gouverneur de l'Algérie, tué devant Constantine le 12 octobre 1837:

La Mort de Damrémont, ce sanglant épisode
D'une guerre sans fin comme sans résultat,
D'Émile de Lansac est le tableau d'éclat.
Mais ce n'est qu'un quatrain pour qui mérite une ode:
Il fallait du héros éterniser les traits,
Et ne pas s'en servir comme d'un vain prétexte
Pour aduler un prince et broder sur le texte
Un pareil nombre de portraits.

== Sources ==
- Benezit Dictionary of Artists, Volume 6, page 436 (1976)
- René Fage in: Bulletin de la Société des lettres, sciences et arts de la Corrèze (1890)
- François-Émile de Lansac on the Joconde database
- Nina M. Athanassoglou-Kallmyer French Images From the Greek War of Independence 1821-1830
- Elisabeth Hardouin-Fugier & Françoise Dupuis-Testenoire Le Peintre et l'animal en France au xix siècle. Editions de l'Amateur, 2001 (ISBN 2-85917-326-9)
- La Grèce en révolte, Delacroix et les peintres français 1815-1848. Éditions de la Réunion des musées nationaux, Paris 1996 (ISBN 2-7118-3395-X)
