= The Battle of Smolensk =

Painting by Jean-Charles Langlois

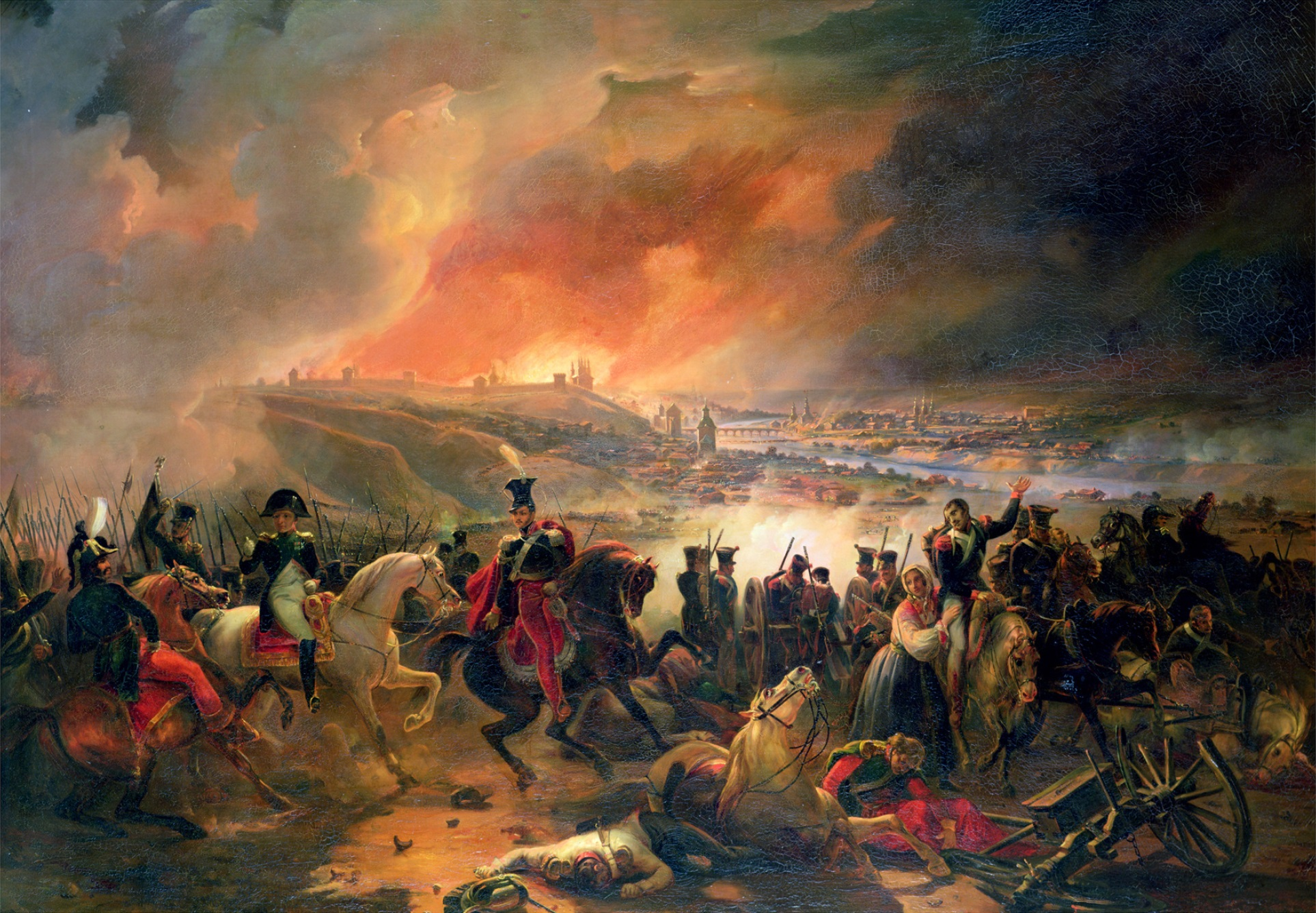
- Artist: Jean-Charles Langlois
- Year: 1839
- Medium: Oil on canvas
- Dimensions: 184 cm × 259 cm (72 in × 102 in)
- Location: Palace of Versailles, Versailles

The Battle of Smolensk (French: Bataille de Smolensk 17 Aout 1812) is an 1839 history painting by the French artist Jean-Charles Langlois. It depicts the Battle of Smolensk fought on 17 August 1812 during the French Invasion of Russia. The first major battle of the campaign it was a French victory with Napoleon leading his forces to victory. In the process French artillery bombardments left Smolensk, particularly the Old City, in flames. The painting shows the burning city straddling the River Dnieper in the background. In the foreground are Napoleon and the Polish commander Józef Poniatowski.

It was one of several battle scenes produced by Langlois. The painting was commissioned by Louis Philippe I to hang in the Galerie des Batailles in the refurbished Palace of Versailles. It was exhibited at the Salon of 1839 at the Louvre in Paris. Today it remains on display at the Palace of Versailles.

== Bibliography ==
- Martin, Roger. La peinture napoléonienne après l'Empire: le Salon des artistes français de 1817 à 1914 et la vogue de la carte postale illustrée. Teissèdre, 2006.
- Nafziger, George. Napoleon's Invasion of Russia. Random House Publishing Group, 2009.
- Samuels, Maurice. The Spectacular Past: Popular History and the Novel in Nineteenth-Century France. Cornell University Press, 2018.
