= Beaumont-en-Auge =

- Commune
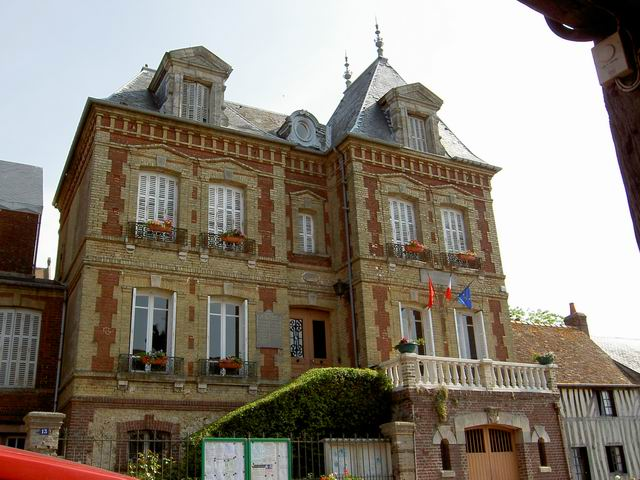
- Town hall

- Coat of arms
- Location of Beaumont-en-Auge
- Location within France Location within Normandy
- Coordinates: 49°16′44″N 0°06′38″E
- Country: France
- Region: Normandy
- Department: Calvados
- Arrondissement: Lisieux
- Canton: Pont-l'Évêque
- Intercommunality: CC Terre d'Auge

Government
  - Mayor (2021–2026): Sylviane Ebrard
- Area^{1}: 7.98 km^{2} (3.08 sq mi)
- Elevation: 125 m (410 ft)
- Highest elevation: 146 m (479 ft)
- Lowest elevation: 29 m (95 ft)
- Population (2023): 376
  - Density: 47.1/km^{2} (122/sq mi)
- Time zone: UTC+01:00 (CET)
  - Summer (DST): UTC+02:00 (CEST)
- INSEE/Postal code: 14055 /14950
- ^{1} French Land Register data, which excludes lakes, ponds, glaciers > 1 km^{2} (0.386 sq mi or 247 acres) and river estuaries.

Beaumont-en-Auge (French pronunciation: [bomɔ̃ ɑ̃.n‿oʒ], literally Beaumont in Auge) is a commune in the Calvados department in the Normandy region in northwestern France. The town hosts one of the last kaleidoscope manufacturers in France.

== Population ==
Historical population

Year	Pop.	±% p.a.
1793	1,034	—
1861	821	−0.34%
1911	603	−0.62%
1962	542	−0.21%
1968	469	−2.38%
1975	409	−1.94%
1982	397	−0.42%

Year	Pop.	±% p.a.
1990	472	+2.19%
1999	496	+0.55%
2007	459	−0.96%
2012	433	−1.16%
2017	400	−1.57%
2023	376	−1.03%

Source: EHESS and INSEE

== Notable people ==
- Pierre-Simon Laplace (1749–1827), mathematician, physicist, astronomer and philosopher.
- Jean-Charles Langlois (1789–1870), soldier and military commander during the Napoleonic Wars, painter of battles.

== See also ==
- The brilliance of Beaumont-en-Auge; vintage and current images of the village with a short biography of Laplace
- Communes of the Calvados department
