= Jean-Charles Langlois =

French painter (1789–1870)

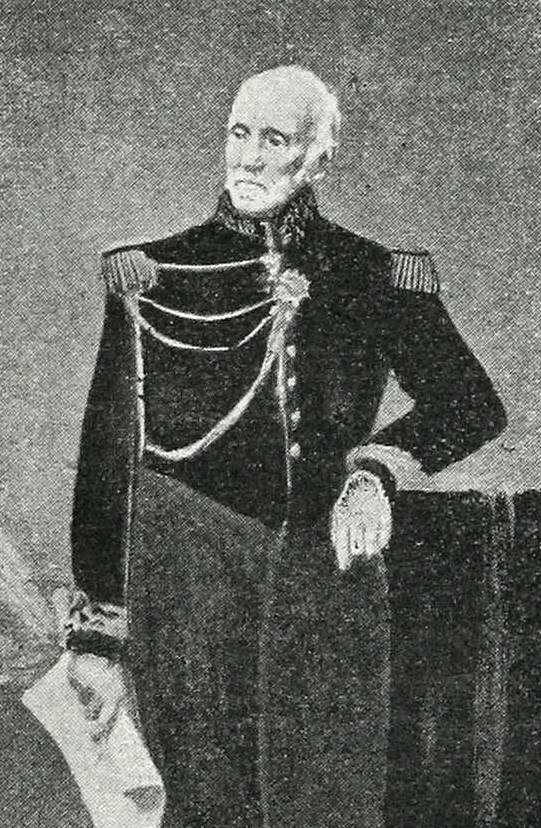
- Jean-Charles Langlois, 1911–1915
- Born: 22 July 1789; Beaumont-en-Auge, France
- Died: 23 March 1870 (aged 80); Paris, France
- Education: École Polytechnique; Girodet-Trioson
- Known for: Painter, photographer
- Movement: Orientalist

Jean-Charles Langlois (French pronunciation: [ʒɑ̃ ʃaʁl lɑ̃ɡlwa]; 22 July 1789 – 1870), known as The Colonel, was a French soldier, painter and photographer.

== Biography ==
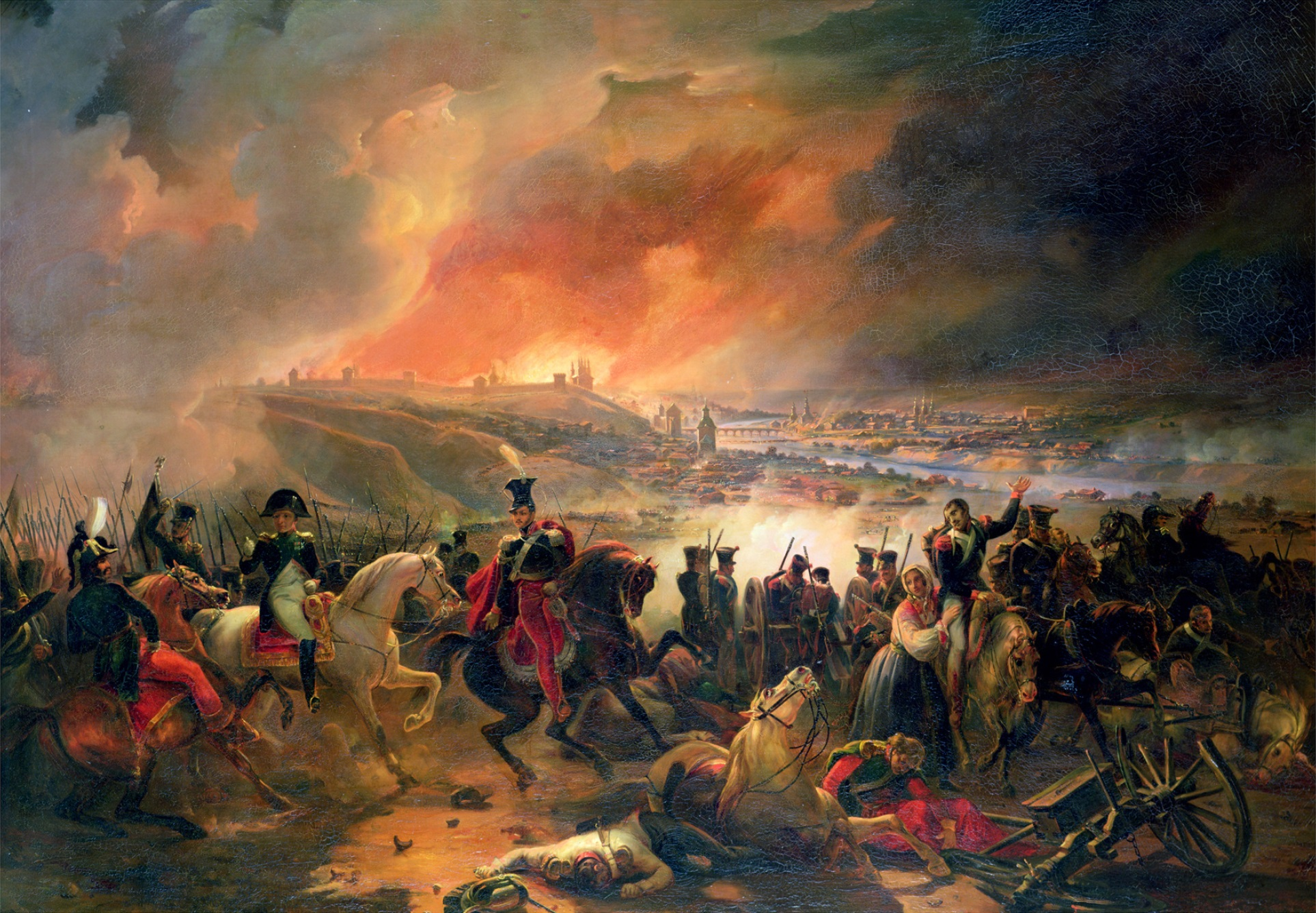
The Battle of Smolensk by Langlois, 1839

Langlois was born in Beaumont-en-Auge. He graduated from the École Polytechnique in 1806 and fought, as an infantry officer at the battles of Wagram, Gerona and Waterloo with a bravery that had him seriously injured and appointed colonel at the young age of twenty-six.

After he retired on half-pay, Langlois devoted himself to painting. Studying with Girodet-Trioson, he specialized in landscapes, painting battles only, for he considered these to embody the most intense experiences life could offer. His paintings include the Fire of Moscow, the Battle of Eylau, the Battle of the Nile, the Battle of Montereau, the Battle of Borodino, the Battle of Wagram. He also used photography to document the Crimean War where he traveled with photographer Léon-Eugène Méhédin. He specialized in panoramic painting after having seen the Panorama of Athens by the first French panorama painter Pierre Prévost. Many of his panoramas were destroyed during the Siege of Paris (1870–1871).

In 1873, Langlois' family bequeathed 256 paintings representing battles and military panoramas to the musée des Beaux-Arts de Caen. These paintings were transferred in 1888 to the Pavillon des sociétés savantes, an 18th-century building spruced up at his niece's expense to house the Langlois museum.

Half of the works exhibited there were destroyed in 1944 during the Battle for Caen. François-Émile de Lansac was his pupil.

== Gallery ==
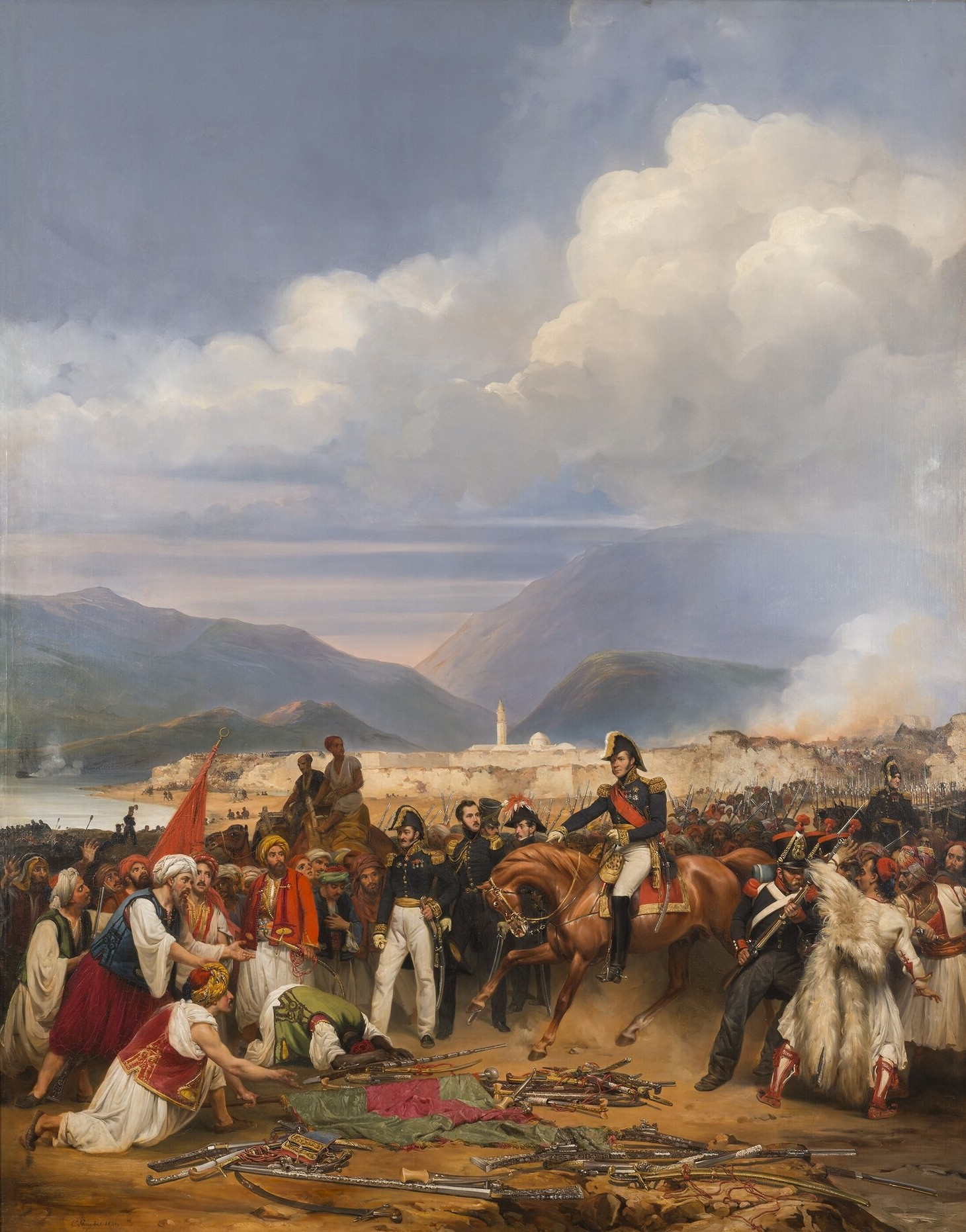
Le Général Maison reçoit la reddition de Château de Morée, 1836

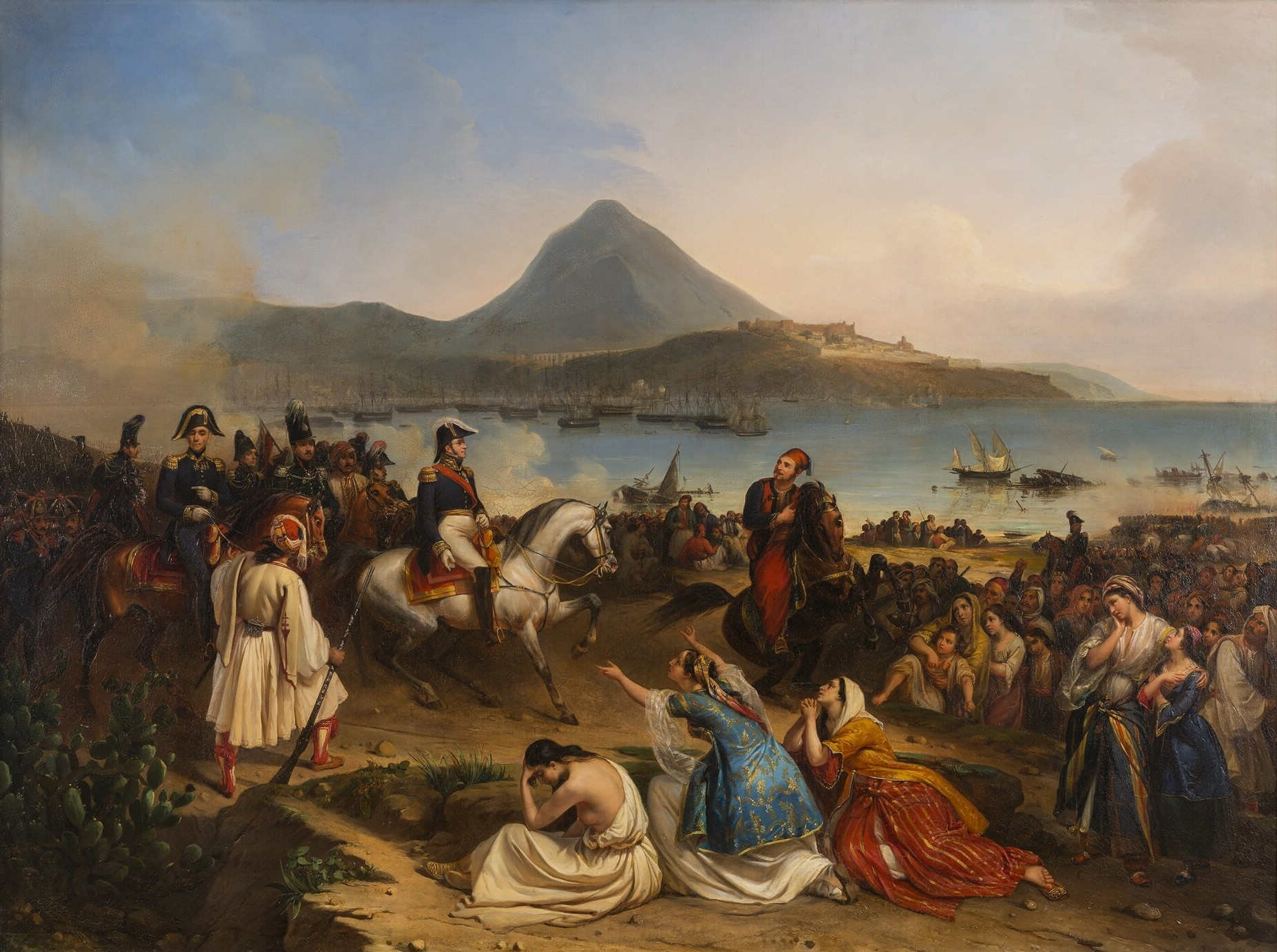
Entrevue du général Maison et d'Ibrahim Pacha, à Navarin, 1837

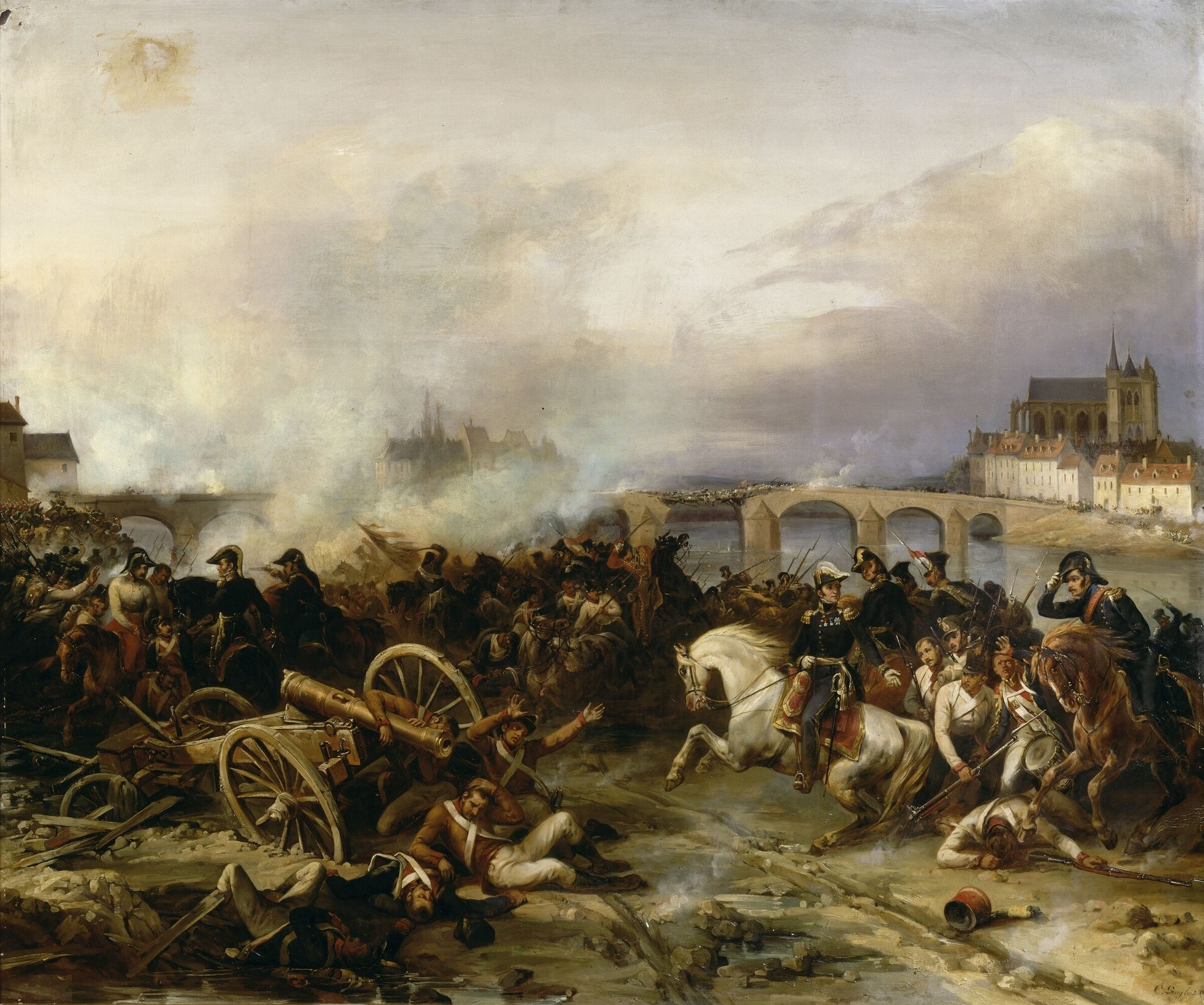
Battle of Montereau, 1840

== Publications ==
- Explication du panorama et relation de la bataille de Solferino, Paris, Dupont, 1866.
- Explication du panorama représentant la bataille et la prise de Sébastopol, Paris, Havard, 1861.
- Explication du panorama, et relation de la Bataille des pyramides: extraite en partie des dictées de l'empereur à Sainte-Hélène, et des pièces officielles, Paris, Didot, 1853.
- Relation du combat et de la bataille d'Eylau, Paris, Panorama des Champs-Élysées, 1844.
- La Photographie, la peinture, la guerre: correspondance inédite de Crimée (1855-1856), Éd. François Robichon, André Rouillé, Nîmes, Chambon, 1992. ISBN 2-87711-067-2
- Panorama de la bataille de la Moskowa, Paris, Ducessois, 1835.
- Voyage pittoresque & militaire en Espagne: dédié à S.E. Mr. le Mal. Gouvion St. Cyr, pair de France, Paris, Engelmann, 1826–1830.

== See also ==
- List of Orientalist artists
- Orientalism
