= Canton of L'Aigle =

Coordinates: 48.76°N 0.63°E

- Canton
- Location within the Orne department of France.
- Country: France
- Region: Normandy
- Department: Orne
- No. of communes: {{{nbcomm}}}
- Established: 22 March 2015 (recreated)
- Area: 106.39 km^{2} (41.08 sq mi)
- Population (2023): 12,146
  - Density: 114.16/km^{2} (295.69/sq mi)
- INSEE code: 6101

The canton of L'Aigle is an administrative division of the Orne department, northwestern France. It was developed as part of the French canton reorganization in March 2015. Its seat is in L'Aigle.

== Political representation ==
=== General councillors from 1833 to 1982 ===
List of successive general councillors
In office		Name	Party	Capacity
1833	1850	Paul Amand Jacques Rossignol (1776-1849)		Mayor of L'Aigle (1830-1832 and 1834-1841)
1850	1852	Pierre François Auguste Rousselet		Municipal Councillor for L'Aigle
1852	1864	Auguste Benjamin Marchand		Mayor of L'Aigle
1864	1871	Amédée Beau	Center	Mayor of Tubœuf, Deputy (1871-1876)
1871	1873 (deceased)	Jacques-Alphonse Lebas (1811-1873)		
1873	1892	Auguste Lherminier	Republican	Municipal Councillor for L'Aigle
1892	1914 (deceased)	Charles-Edmond Clouet	Republican	Mayor of L'Aigle (1890-1896 and 1904-1912)
1914	1919	Vacant		
1919	1923 (deceased)	Eugène Lherminier	Republican	Mayor of L'Aigle (1919-1923)
1923	1940	René Vivien (1880-?)	RG	Mayor of L'Aigle (1923-1942)
1943	1945	André Coret		Municipal Councillor for L'Aigle
1945	1964	Ernest Voyer	UDSR puis UNR	Mayor of L'Aigle (1944-1965), Deputy (1945-1946 and 1962-1967)
1964	1982	Roland Boudet	CD then UDF-CDS	Deputy (1958-1962 and 1967-1978), Mayor of L'Aigle (1965-1989)

=== Departmental councillors since 2015 ===
List of successive departmental councillors
Period elected		Mandat		Name	Party	Capacity
2015	2021	2015	Incumbent	Charlène Renard	LR	Deputy Mayor of L'Aigle
2015	2021	2015	Incumbent	Philippe Van-Hoorne	DVD	Mayor of L'Aigle since July 2017

== Composition ==
=== Composition since 2015 ===
The canton of L'Aigle is composed of seven communes in their entirety.

List of communes in the canton of L'Aigle since 2015
Commune	Code INSEE	Intercommunity	Area (km^{2})	Population (last legal population)	Density (per km^{2})
L'Aigle (seat)	61214	CC des Pays de L'Aigle	18.02	8,090 (2017)	449
Chandai	61092	CC des Pays de L'Aigle	13.73	664 (2017)	48
Saint-Martin-d'Écublei	61423	CC des Pays de L'Aigle	11.94	651 (2017)	55
Saint-Michel-Tubœuf	61432	CC des Pays de L'Aigle	8.73	642 (2017)	74
Saint-Ouen-sur-Iton	61440	CC des Pays de L'Aigle	14.19	825 (2017)	58
Saint-Sulpice-sur-Risle	61456	CC des Pays de L'Aigle	28.45	1,672 (2017)	59
Vitrai-sous-Laigle	61510	CC des Pays de L'Aigle	11.33	232 (2017)	20
Canton de L'Aigle	6101	—	106.39	12,776 (2017)	120
