= Chandai =

- Commune
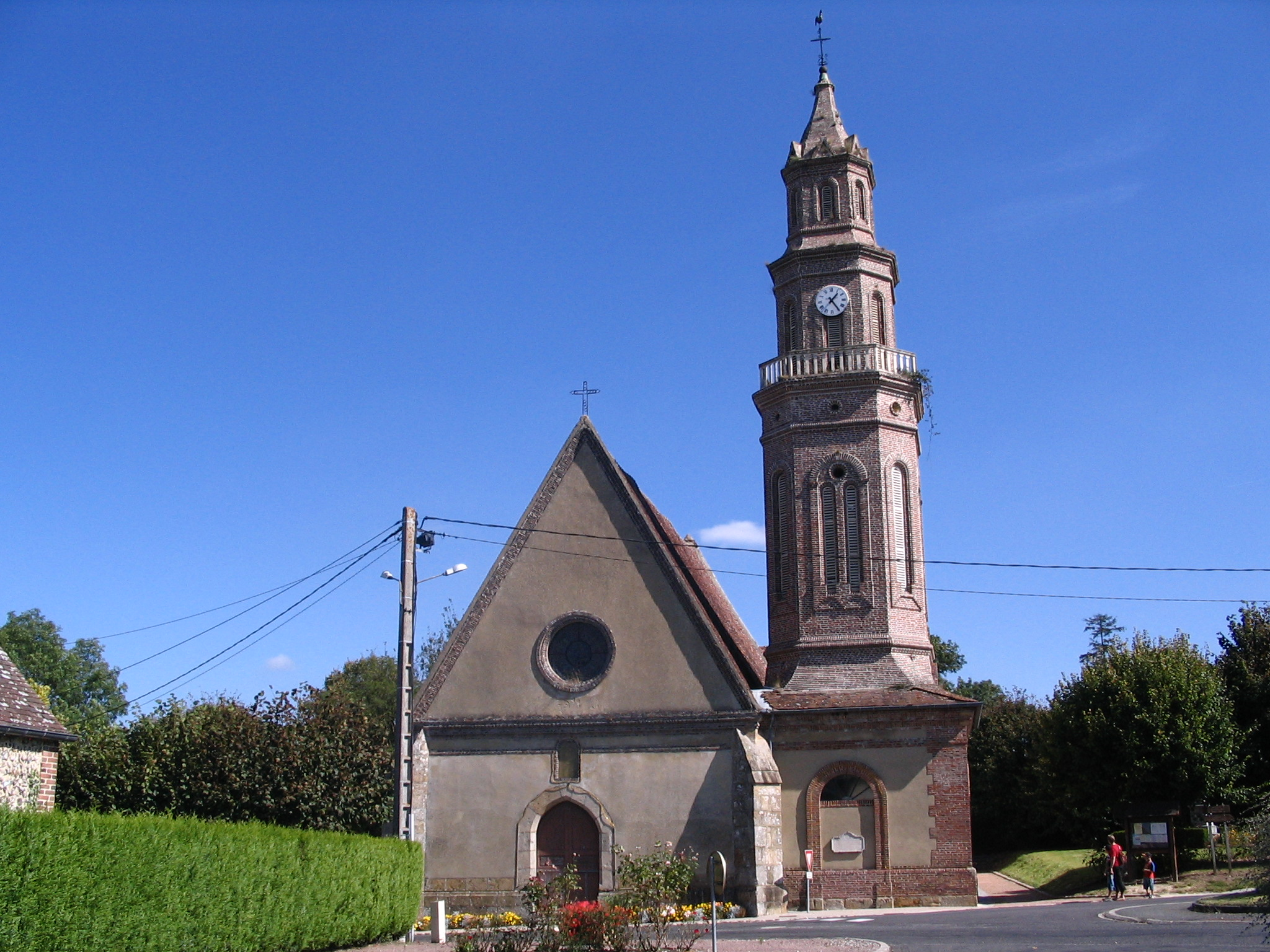
- The church in Chandai
- Location of Chandai
- Location within France Location within Normandy
- Coordinates: 48°45′14″N 0°44′24″E
- Country: France
- Region: Normandy
- Department: Orne
- Arrondissement: Mortagne-au-Perche
- Canton: L'Aigle
- Intercommunality: CC des Pays de L'Aigle

Government
  - Mayor (2020–2026): Serge Godard
- Area^{1}: 13.73 km^{2} (5.30 sq mi)
- Elevation: 200 m (660 ft)
- Highest elevation: 222 m (728 ft)
- Lowest elevation: 187 m (614 ft)
- Population (2023): 672
  - Density: 48.9/km^{2} (127/sq mi)
- Time zone: UTC+01:00 (CET)
  - Summer (DST): UTC+02:00 (CEST)
- INSEE/Postal code: 61092 /61300
- ^{1} French Land Register data, which excludes lakes, ponds, glaciers > 1 km^{2} (0.386 sq mi or 247 acres) and river estuaries.

Chandai (French pronunciation: [ʃɑ̃dɛ]) is a commune in the Orne department in north-western France. The current mayor is Serge Godard, re-elected in 2020.

== Geography ==
The commune is made up of the following collection of villages and hamlets, Les Masselins, Chandai, Brévilly, La Houssaie, L'Auvellière and Les Margrains.

A river, the Iton flows through the commune.

== Points of interest ==
=== National heritage sites ===
- Château de Chandai remains of an eighteenth-century castle, that was destroyed in 1961, it was registered as a Monument historique 1999.

== See also ==
- Communes of the Orne department
