= Saint-Ouen-sur-Iton =

- Commune
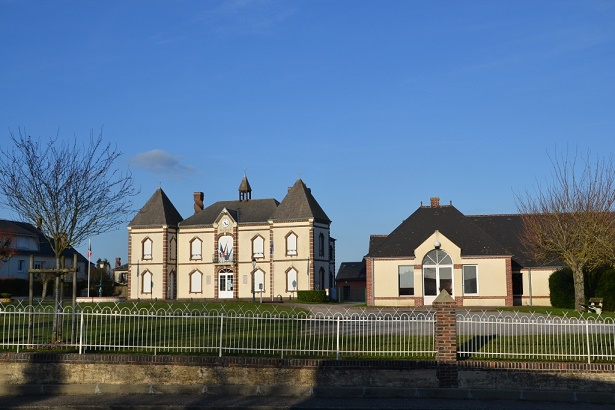
- The town hall in Saint-Ouen-sur-Iton
- Location of Saint-Ouen-sur-Iton
- Location within France Location within Normandy
- Coordinates: 48°44′10″N 0°41′44″E
- Country: France
- Region: Normandy
- Department: Orne
- Arrondissement: Mortagne-au-Perche
- Canton: L'Aigle
- Intercommunality: Pays de l'Aigle

Government
  - Mayor (2020–2026): Joël Brunet
- Area^{1}: 14.19 km^{2} (5.48 sq mi)
- Elevation: 235 m (771 ft)
- Highest elevation: 266 m (873 ft)
- Lowest elevation: 198 m (650 ft)
- Population (2023): 826
  - Density: 58.2/km^{2} (151/sq mi)
- Demonym: Audonien.ne (French)
- Time zone: UTC+01:00 (CET)
  - Summer (DST): UTC+02:00 (CEST)
- INSEE/Postal code: 61440 /61300
- ^{1} French Land Register data, which excludes lakes, ponds, glaciers > 1 km^{2} (0.386 sq mi or 247 acres) and river estuaries.

Saint-Ouen-sur-Iton (French pronunciation: [sɛ̃twɛ̃ syʁ itɔ̃]; Norman: Saint-Ouën-sus-Iton) is a commune in the Orne department, region of Normandy, northwestern France.

The inhabitants are known as Audoniens and Audoniennes in French.

== Geography ==
A river, the Iton flows through the commune.

== Demographics ==
Historical population

Year	Pop.	±% p.a.
1793	178	—
1821	129	−1.14%
1846	429	+4.92%
1872	350	−0.78%
1901	404	+0.50%
1926	377	−0.28%
1946	328	−0.69%
1962	310	−0.35%
1968	387	+3.77%

Year	Pop.	±% p.a.
1975	522	+4.37%
1982	684	+3.94%
1990	802	+2.01%
1999	828	+0.36%
2007	861	+0.49%
2012	923	+1.40%
2017	825	−2.22%
2023	826	+0.02%

Source: EHESS and INSEE (1968-2023)

== Points of Interest ==
- Langlois-Martin founded in 1919, it is the last Sequin manufacturer in France. During Journées européennes du patrimoine the factory is open for tours to the public.

== See also ==
- Communes of the Orne department
