= Saint-Martin-d'Écublei =

- Commune
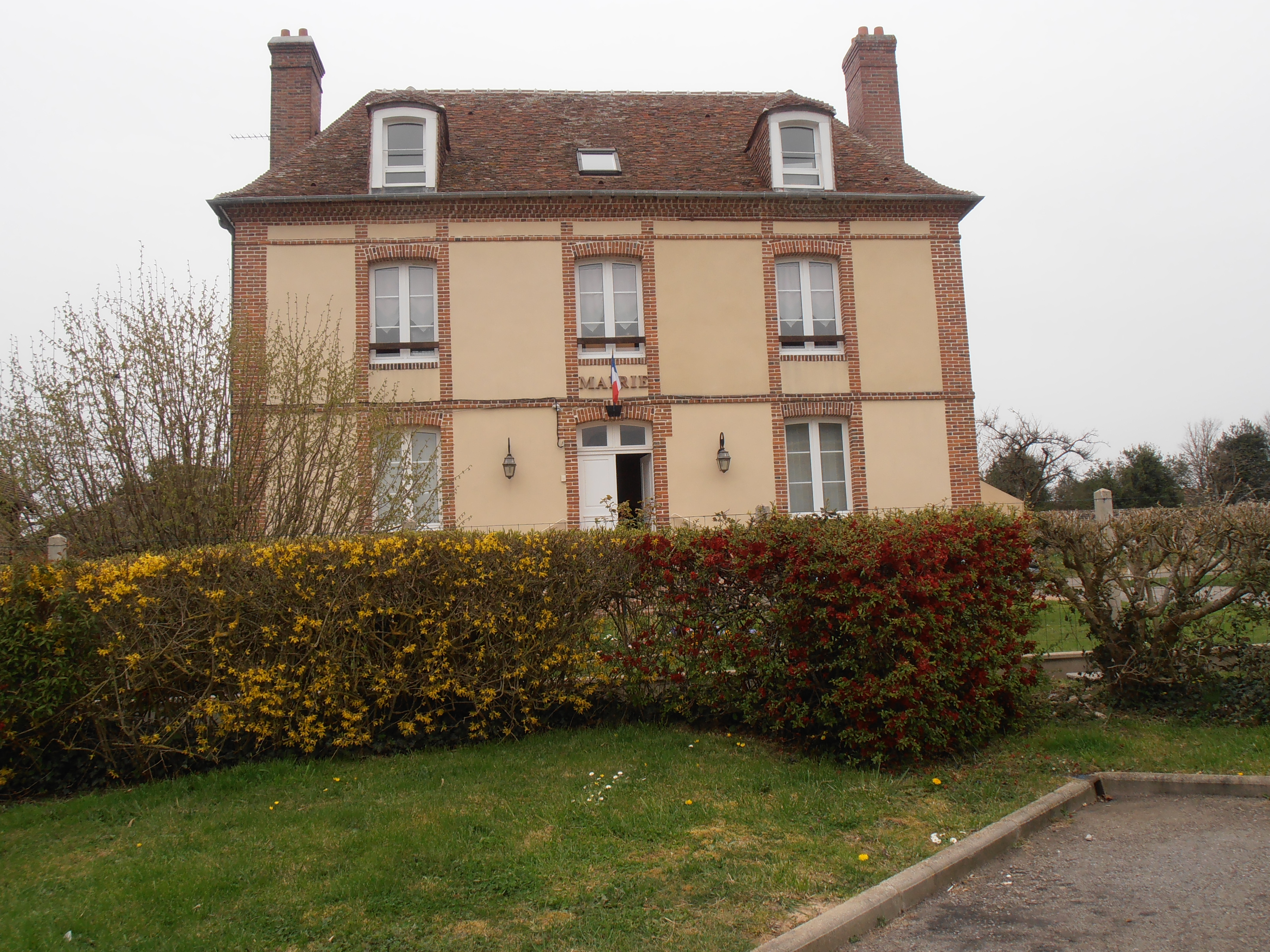
- The town hall in Saint-Martin-d'Écublei
- Location of Saint-Martin-d'Écublei
- Location within France Location within Normandy
- Coordinates: 48°47′29″N 0°40′44″E
- Country: France
- Region: Normandy
- Department: Orne
- Arrondissement: Mortagne-au-Perche
- Canton: L'Aigle
- Intercommunality: Pays de l'Aigle

Government
  - Mayor (2020–2026): Franck Gaultier
- Area^{1}: 11.94 km^{2} (4.61 sq mi)
- Elevation: 210 m (690 ft)
- Highest elevation: 248 m (814 ft)
- Lowest elevation: 182 m (597 ft)
- Population (2023): 625
  - Density: 52.3/km^{2} (136/sq mi)
- Time zone: UTC+01:00 (CET)
  - Summer (DST): UTC+02:00 (CEST)
- INSEE/Postal code: 61423 /61300
- ^{1} French Land Register data, which excludes lakes, ponds, glaciers > 1 km^{2} (0.386 sq mi or 247 acres) and river estuaries.

Saint-Martin-d'Écublei (French pronunciation: [sɛ̃ maʁtɛ̃ dekyblɛ]) is a commune in the Orne department in north-western France.

The town of Saint-Martin d'Ecublei borders the department of Eure. It covers 1,195 hectares (4.61 mi^{2}), is 11 kilometres (7 mi) long, and has a width of 3 km (1.9 mi) at the farthest points.

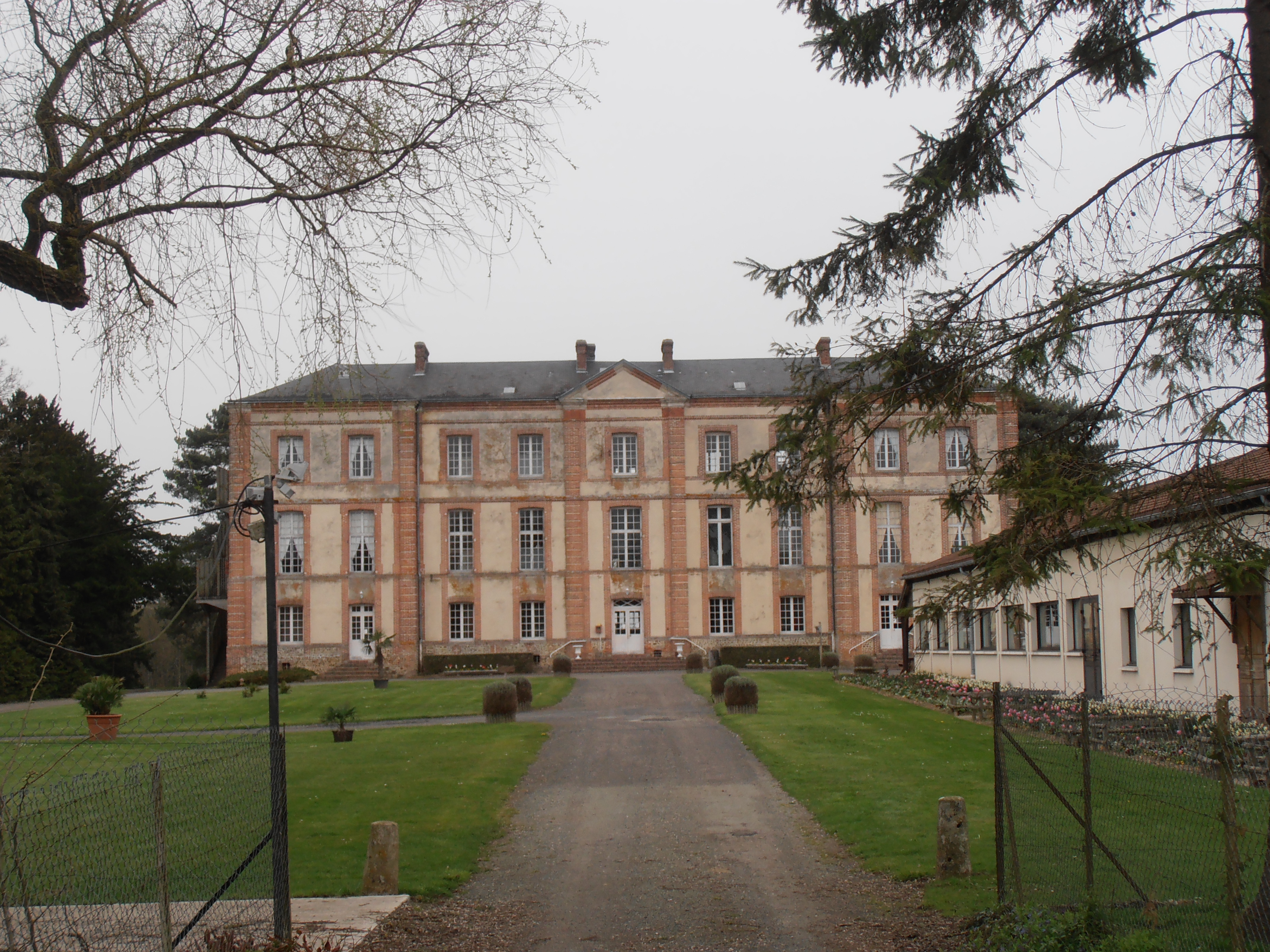
Château du Mesnil

== Geography ==
The river Risle flows through the commune.

== See also ==
- Communes of the Orne department
