= Saint-Michel-Tubœuf =

- Commune
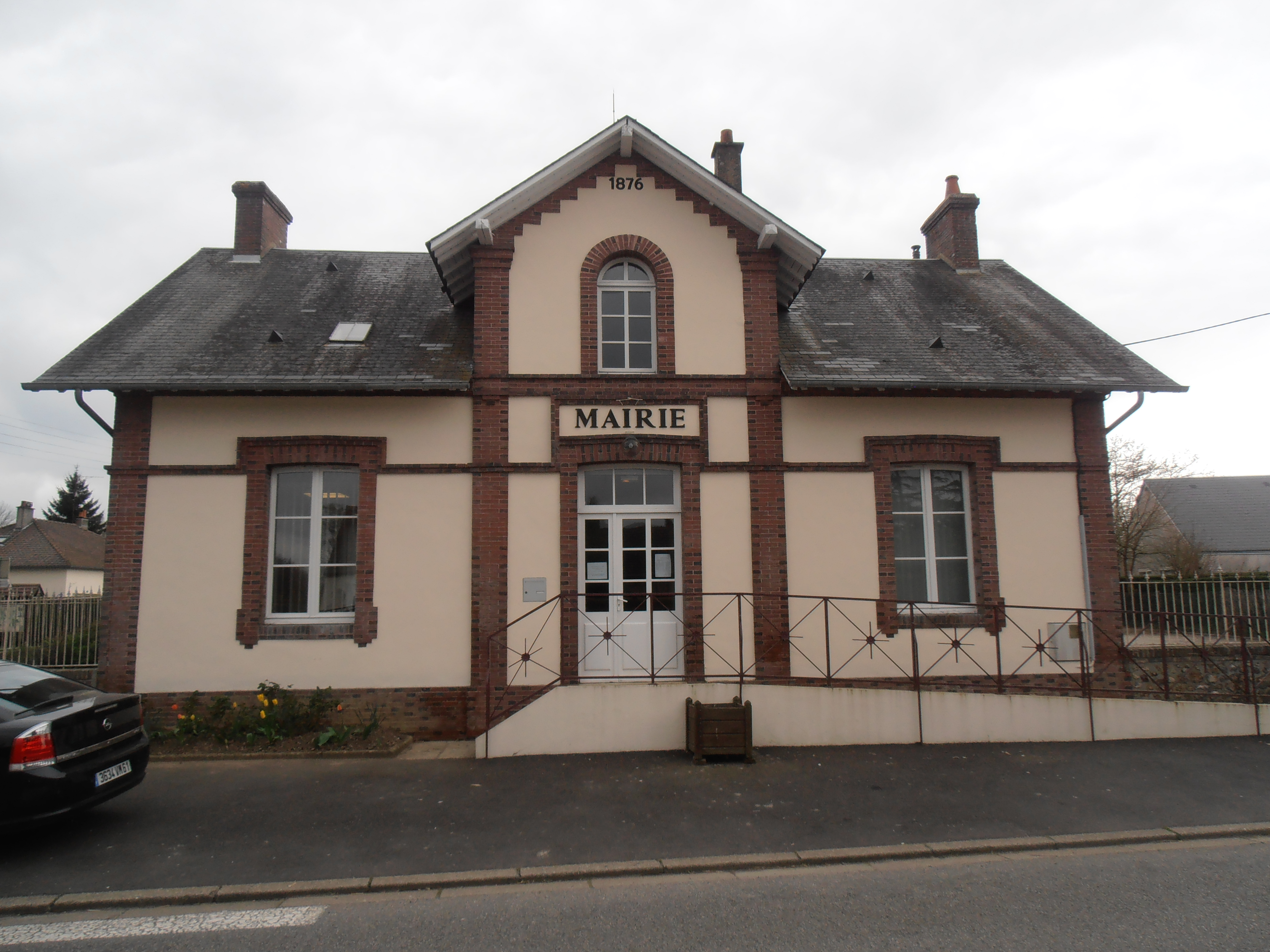
- The town hall in Saint-Michel-Tubœuf
- Location of Saint-Michel-Tubœuf
- Location within France Location within Normandy
- Coordinates: 48°45′10″N 0°41′23″E
- Country: France
- Region: Normandy
- Department: Orne
- Arrondissement: Mortagne-au-Perche
- Canton: L'Aigle
- Intercommunality: Pays de l'Aigle

Government
  - Mayor (2020–2026): Christophe Pottier
- Area^{1}: 8.73 km^{2} (3.37 sq mi)
- Elevation: 230 m (750 ft)
- Highest elevation: 241 m (791 ft)
- Lowest elevation: 198 m (650 ft)
- Population (2023): 568
  - Density: 65.1/km^{2} (169/sq mi)
- Time zone: UTC+01:00 (CET)
  - Summer (DST): UTC+02:00 (CEST)
- INSEE/Postal code: 61432 /61300
- ^{1} French Land Register data, which excludes lakes, ponds, glaciers > 1 km^{2} (0.386 sq mi or 247 acres) and river estuaries.

Saint-Michel-Tubœuf (French pronunciation: [sɛ̃ miʃɛl tybœf]) is a commune in the Orne department in north-western France. The commune was formed in 1965 by the merger of the former communes Saint-Michel-la-Forêt and Tubœuf.

== Points of Interest ==
=== National heritage sites ===
The Commune has two buildings and areas listed as a Monument historique

Château de Thubeuf is a seventeenth century chateau and grounds, that was classed as a Monument historique in 1992.

Buat tower is a Chappe telegraph tower, built in the eighteenth century, as part of a 58 station system, used to convey messages from Paris to Brest.

== Notable people ==
- Eugène Pirou (1841–1909) was a photographer and filmmaker, who was born here.

== See also ==
- Communes of the Orne department
