= Saint-Sulpice-sur-Risle =

- Commune
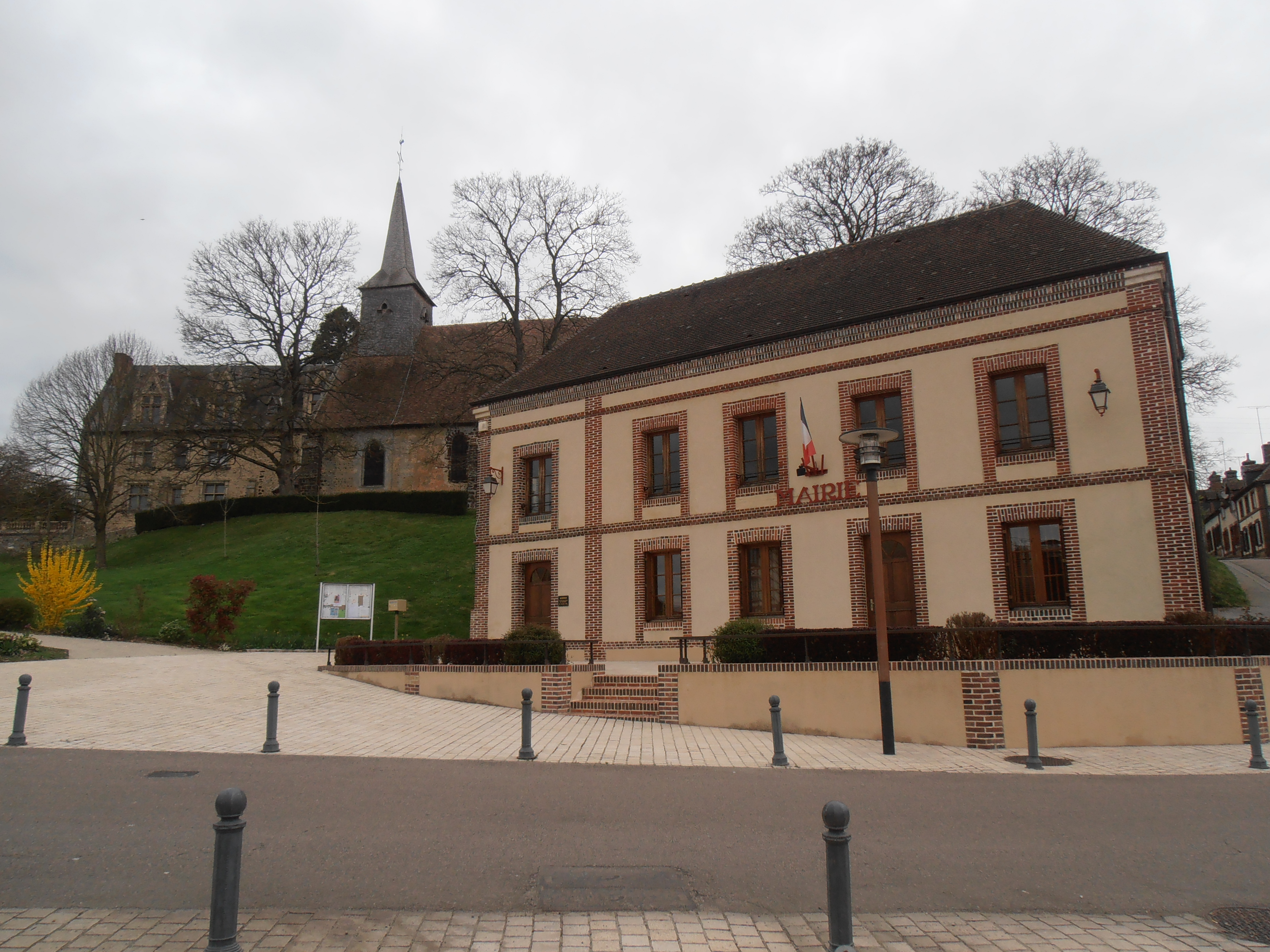
- The town hall and church in Saint-Sulpice-sur-Risle
- Location of Saint-Sulpice-sur-Risle
- Location within France Location within Normandy
- Coordinates: 48°46′53″N 0°39′27″E
- Country: France
- Region: Normandy
- Department: Orne
- Arrondissement: Mortagne-au-Perche
- Canton: L'Aigle
- Intercommunality: Pays de l'Aigle

Government
  - Mayor (2020–2026): Jean Sellier
- Area^{1}: 28.45 km^{2} (10.98 sq mi)
- Elevation: 206 m (676 ft)
- Highest elevation: 258 m (846 ft)
- Lowest elevation: 187 m (614 ft)
- Population (2023): 1,583
  - Density: 55.64/km^{2} (144.1/sq mi)
- Time zone: UTC+01:00 (CET)
  - Summer (DST): UTC+02:00 (CEST)
- INSEE/Postal code: 61456 /61300
- ^{1} French Land Register data, which excludes lakes, ponds, glaciers > 1 km^{2} (0.386 sq mi or 247 acres) and river estuaries.

Saint-Sulpice-sur-Risle (French pronunciation: [sɛ̃ sylpis syʁ ʁil], literally Saint-Sulpice on Risle) is a commune in the Orne department in north-western France.

== Geography ==
The river Risle flows through the commune.

== Points of Interest ==
=== National heritage sites ===
The Commune has four buildings and areas listed as a Monument historique

Fontenil Estate an estate with buildings from the fifteenth century, and main chateau dating from the sixteenth century, all listed as a monument in 1989.

Dolmen du Jarrier is a Neolithic dolmen that was classed as a Monument historique in 1976.

Church of Saint-Sulpice-sur-Risle is a thirteenth century church that was classed as a Monument historique in 1988.

Bohin factory is a nineteenth century factory, that was classed as a Monument historique in 1988. The factory is still active and is the last factory in France still producing pins and needles for sewing. The Factory has a museum and is open itself for tours by the public.

== Transport ==
- Aérodrome de L'Aigle - Saint-Michel is an Aerodrome within the commune that was opened in 1955. Its ICAO airport code is LFOL. It has a hard runway of 763 x 20 metres.

== See also ==
- Communes of the Orne department
