= L'Aigle =

- Commune
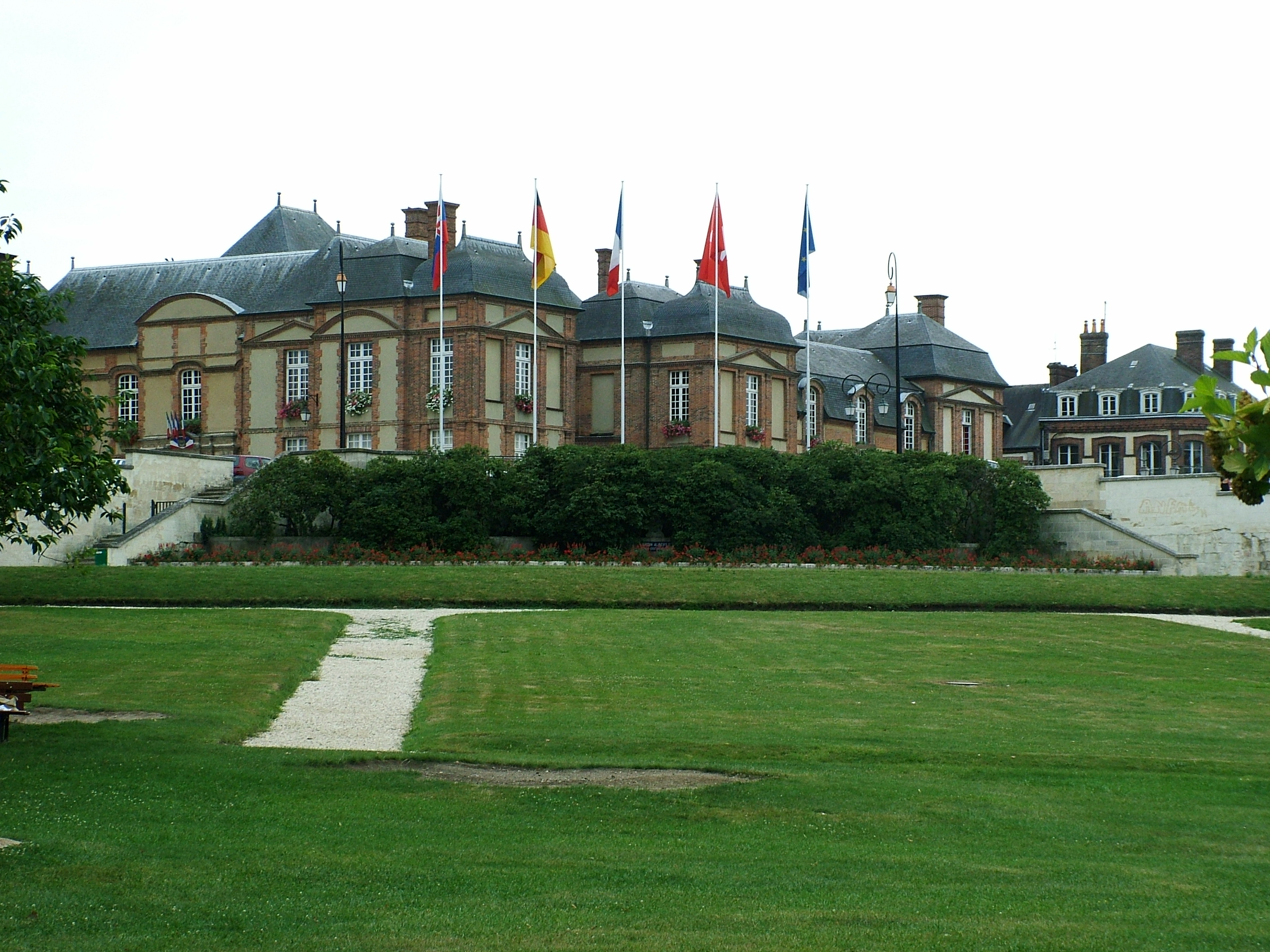
- The chateau in L'Aigle

- Coat of arms
- Location of L'Aigle
- Location within France Location within Normandy
- Coordinates: 48°45′54″N 0°37′42″E
- Country: France
- Region: Normandy
- Department: Orne
- Arrondissement: Mortagne-au-Perche
- Canton: L'Aigle
- Intercommunality: Pays de L'Aigle

Government
  - Mayor (2020–2026): Philippe Van-Hoorne
- Area^{1}: 18.02 km^{2} (6.96 sq mi)
- Elevation: 210 m (690 ft)
- Highest elevation: 277 m (909 ft)
- Lowest elevation: 195 m (640 ft)
- Population (2023): 7,663
  - Density: 425.2/km^{2} (1,101/sq mi)
- Time zone: UTC+01:00 (CET)
  - Summer (DST): UTC+02:00 (CEST)
- INSEE/Postal code: 61214 /61300
- ^{1} French Land Register data, which excludes lakes, ponds, glaciers > 1 km^{2} (0.386 sq mi or 247 acres) and river estuaries.

L'Aigle is a commune in the Orne department in Normandy in northwestern France. Before 1961, the commune was known as Laigle. According to Orderic Vitalis, the nest of an eagle (aigle in French) was discovered during the construction of the castle.

== History ==
- 8 January 1354: Assassination of the Constable of France, Charles d'Espagne, by men of Charles the Bad, king of Navarre.

=== Meteorite ===
On 26 April 1803 a meteoroid entered the Earth's atmosphere and air burst over L'Aigle.

== Geography ==
The commune is made up of the following collection of villages and hamlets, Le Halboudet, L'Aigle, Les Haies and La Croix Lamirault.

The river Risle flows through the commune in addition to a stream, Ruisseau du Gru.

=== Climate ===
Climate data for L'Aigle (1997–2020 normals, extremes 1997–present)
Month	Jan	Feb	Mar	Apr	May	Jun	Jul	Aug	Sep	Oct	Nov	Dec	Year
Record high °C (°F)	15.9 (60.6)	20.0 (68.0)	23.8 (74.8)	26.8 (80.2)	29.4 (84.9)	36.1 (97.0)	39.5 (103.1)	38.3 (100.9)	34.0 (93.2)	27.5 (81.5)	21.5 (70.7)	15.4 (59.7)	39.5 (103.1)
Mean daily maximum °C (°F)	6.5 (43.7)	7.8 (46.0)	11.0 (51.8)	14.5 (58.1)	17.8 (64.0)	21.3 (70.3)	23.6 (74.5)	23.6 (74.5)	20.4 (68.7)	15.3 (59.5)	10.2 (50.4)	7.2 (45.0)	14.9 (58.8)
Daily mean °C (°F)	3.9 (39.0)	4.6 (40.3)	6.9 (44.4)	9.3 (48.7)	12.6 (54.7)	15.9 (60.6)	17.9 (64.2)	18.0 (64.4)	15.1 (59.2)	11.5 (52.7)	7.3 (45.1)	4.6 (40.3)	10.6 (51.1)
Mean daily minimum °C (°F)	1.4 (34.5)	1.3 (34.3)	2.7 (36.9)	4.1 (39.4)	7.4 (45.3)	10.4 (50.7)	12.1 (53.8)	12.3 (54.1)	9.8 (49.6)	7.8 (46.0)	4.4 (39.9)	2.0 (35.6)	6.3 (43.3)
Record low °C (°F)	−14.0 (6.8)	−15.4 (4.3)	−10.0 (14.0)	−4.8 (23.4)	−1.9 (28.6)	1.2 (34.2)	4.6 (40.3)	4.1 (39.4)	0.4 (32.7)	−5.4 (22.3)	−8.7 (16.3)	−11.2 (11.8)	−15.4 (4.3)
Average precipitation mm (inches)	65.2 (2.57)	57.3 (2.26)	55.2 (2.17)	51.2 (2.02)	65.7 (2.59)	54.6 (2.15)	52.9 (2.08)	54.6 (2.15)	44.3 (1.74)	73.8 (2.91)	69.5 (2.74)	85.4 (3.36)	729.7 (28.73)
Average precipitation days (≥ 1.0 mm)	12.3	11.5	10.7	9.5	9.9	8.9	8.0	9.1	7.6	11.7	12.6	14.1	126.1
Source: Meteociel

== Population ==
Historical population
Year	Pop.	±% p.a.
1968	8,702	—
1975	9,619	+1.44%
1982	9,834	+0.32%
1990	9,466	−0.48%
1999	8,972	−0.59%
2007	8,508	−0.66%
2012	7,940	−1.37%
2017	8,090	+0.38%
2023	7,663	−0.90%
Source: INSEE

== Points of interest ==
- Municipal Museum of Archaeology is a Museum of France with three distinct spaces, firstly the Museum of June 44 which tells the story of the Battle of Normandy, since 1953 in L'Aigle. The second area is the Musée De La Météorite De L'aigle - which is dedicated to the 1803 event in L'Aigle when thousands of fragments of a meteorite reached the ground of L'Aigle. Lastly there is the Archeology exhibit, which shows pre-historic times to the Iron-age.
- Musée des Instruments de musique is a museum located in the town hall, presenting to the public over 90 different types of instruments. The museum opened in 1983, when local musician, Marcel Angot, upon his death bequeathed his collection to the local community.
- musée Louis Verrière is a museum dedicated to the work of local farmer and woodcarver Louis Verrière. Works include a replica of the Eiffel Tower and panorama of Lourdes, which took 30,000 hours to complete. The museum opened to the public in 2014.

=== National heritage sites ===
The commune has eight buildings and areas listed as a Monument historique.

- L'Aigle Chateau, a seventeenth-century chateau including its shed and stables were listed as a monument in 1948.
- Saint-Barthélémy Church, a twelfth-century church, originally part of the Saint-Lhomer abbey of Blois, was listed in 1966
- Saint-Jean Church, a fifteenth-century church which was registered as a monument in 1985
- Saint-Martin Church, aAn eleventh-century church, which had work added to it in the fifteenth, sixteenth and twentieth centuries, was listed as a monument in 1990. The work in the 20th century, which was to repair the glass roofs of the southern roof, also saw the empty canopies of the southern part decorated with work from artists including Paul Belmondo, Hubert Yencesse and Jean Lambert-Rucki.
- Hotel Colombel de la Rousselière, a seventeenth-century hotel, which was listed in 1981.
- Small Hotel Colombel, an eighteenth-century hotel, registered as a monument in 1987.
- Mérouvel needle factory. Built in 1819, the factory remained in use until 1952, where after the Second World War it spent the last few years of its life as a plastics moulding factory. The workshops have since been in part transformed into housing, and it was listed as a monument in 1987.
- Coaching inn. This former coaching inn was built in the eighteenth century, and listed as a monument in 1981.

== Transport ==
L'Aigle station has rail connections to Argentan, Paris and Granville.

== Notable people ==
- Charles de la Cerda (1327–1354), commonly known as Charles of Spain, was a Franco-Castilian nobleman and soldier who died here.
- Charles-Simon Catel (1773–1830), a composer and educator, was born here.
- Léon Richer (1824–1911), a free-thinker, freemason, journalist and feminist who worked closely with Maria Deraismes during the early years of the feminist movement in Paris, was born here.
- Léon-Eugène Méhédin (1828–1905), an archaeologist, architect and photographer who was born here.
- André Sylvane (1851, L'Aigle – 1932), a dramatist and screenwriter, was born here.
- Jacques Osmont (born 1954), a former professional cyclist who was born here.
- Véronique Louwagie (Born 1962) a French politician was a mayor of the commune
- Nathalie Desmares (born 1972) a snowboarder who was born here.
- İpek Kaya (born 1994), a professional footballer who was born here.
- Nicolas Prodhomme (born 1997), a professional cyclist who was born here.
- Louise Fleury (born 1997), a professional footballer was born here.

== Heraldry ==
Arms of L'Aigle	The arms of L'Aigle are blazoned: Or, a double-headed eagle sable, a chief France modern (Azure, 3 fleurs de lys Or).

== Twin towns – sister cities ==
L'Aigle is twinned with:

- Aigle, Switzerland
- Naftalan, Azerbaijan
- Clausthal-Zellerfeld, Germany
- Spišská Nová Ves, Slovakia

== See also ==
- Communes of the Orne department
- L'Aigle family
- L'Aigle station
