= Mamers =

- Subprefecture and commune
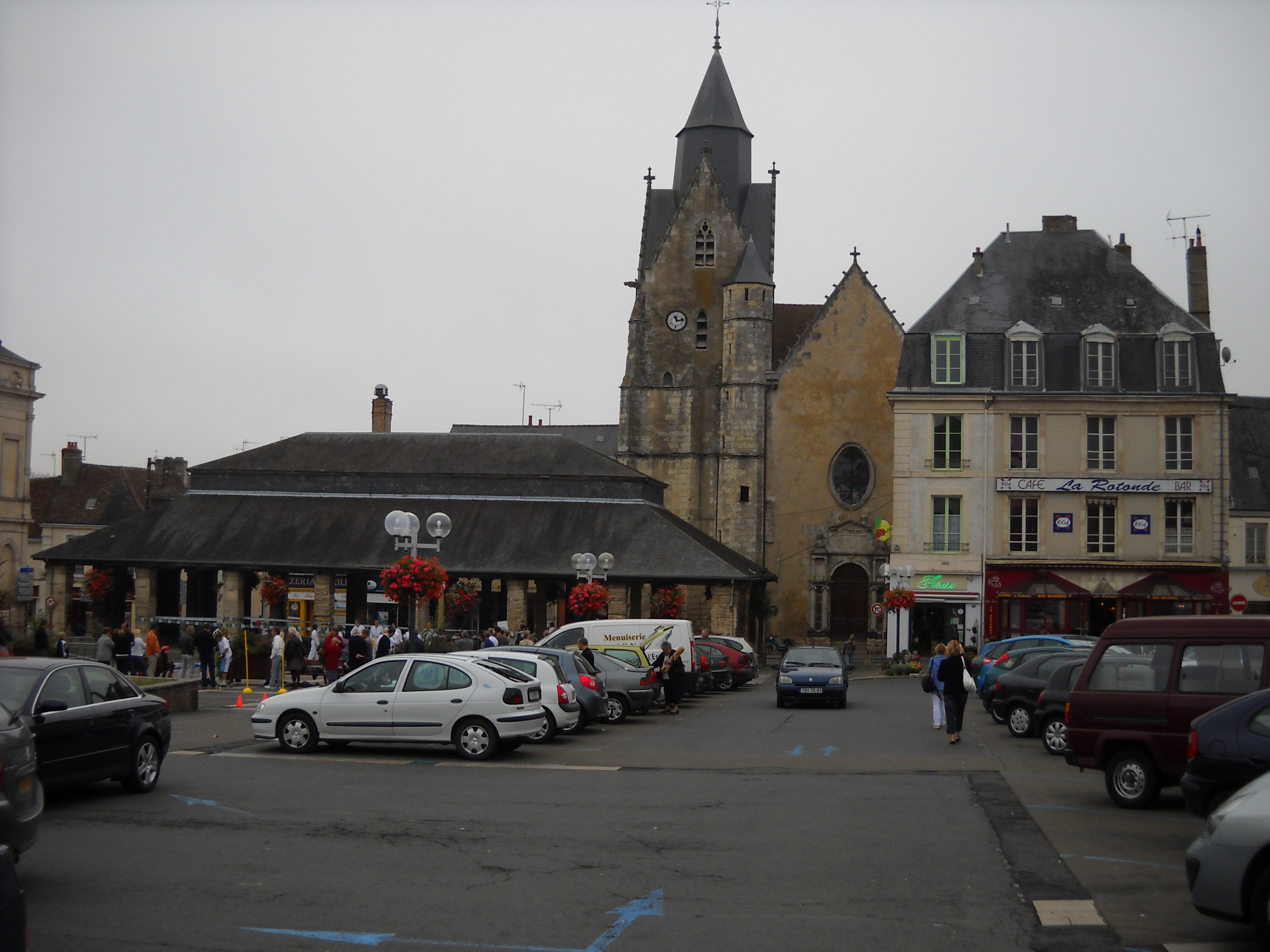
- Carnot Square at the town center

- Coat of arms
- Location of Mamers
- Location within France Location within Pays de la Loire
- Coordinates: 48°21′06″N 0°22′04″E
- Country: France
- Region: Pays de la Loire
- Department: Sarthe
- Arrondissement: Mamers
- Canton: Mamers
- Intercommunality: Maine Saosnois

Government
  - Mayor (2020–2026): Frédéric Beauchef
- Area^{1}: 5.05 km^{2} (1.95 sq mi)
- Population (2023): 4,996
  - Density: 989/km^{2} (2,560/sq mi)
- Time zone: UTC+01:00 (CET)
  - Summer (DST): UTC+02:00 (CEST)
- INSEE/Postal code: 72180 /72600
- ^{1} French Land Register data, which excludes lakes, ponds, glaciers > 1 km^{2} (0.386 sq mi or 247 acres) and river estuaries.

Mamers (French: [mamɛʁs]) is a commune in the Sarthe department in the region of Pays de la Loire in north-western France. The neighboring communes are: Commerveil, Saint-Longis, Saint-Rémy-des-Monts, Origny-le-Roux, Suré. Mamers is twinned with the town Market Rasen in Lincolnshire, England.

== Population ==
Historical population
| Year | Pop. | ±% p.a. |
|---|---|---|
| 1968 | 5,777 | — |
| 1975 | 6,392 | +1.46% |
| 1982 | 6,450 | +0.13% |
| 1990 | 6,071 | −0.75% |
| 1999 | 6,084 | +0.02% |
| 2007 | 5,679 | −0.86% |
| 2012 | 5,423 | −0.92% |
| 2017 | 5,300 | −0.46% |
| 2023 | 4,996 | −0.98% |
Source: INSEE

== See also ==
- Communes of the Sarthe department
