= Gémages =

- Part of Val-au-Perche
- Location of Gémages
- Location within France Location within Normandy
- Coordinates: 48°17′41″N 0°36′59″E
- Country: France
- Region: Normandy
- Department: Orne
- Arrondissement: Mortagne-au-Perche
- Canton: Ceton
- Commune: Val-au-Perche
- Area^{1}: 6.47 km^{2} (2.50 sq mi)
- Elevation: 250 m (820 ft)
- Highest elevation: 211 m (692 ft)
- Lowest elevation: 103 m (338 ft)
- Population (2022): 111
  - Density: 17.2/km^{2} (44.4/sq mi)
- Time zone: UTC+01:00 (CET)
  - Summer (DST): UTC+02:00 (CEST)
- Postal code: 61130
- ^{1} French Land Register data, which excludes lakes, ponds, glaciers > 1 km^{2} (0.386 sq mi or 247 acres) and river estuaries.

Gémages (French pronunciation: [ʒemaʒ]) is a former commune in the Orne department in north-western France. On 1 January 2016, it was merged into the new commune of Val-au-Perche.

== See also ==
- Communes of the Orne department
