= La Rouge =

- Part of Val-au-Perche
- Location of La Rouge
- Location within France Location within Normandy
- Coordinates: 48°17′14″N 0°42′28″E
- Country: France
- Region: Normandy
- Department: Orne
- Arrondissement: Mortagne-au-Perche
- Canton: Ceton
- Commune: Val-au-Perche
- Area^{1}: 11.74 km^{2} (4.53 sq mi)
- Elevation: 115 m (377 ft)
- Highest elevation: 187 m (614 ft)
- Lowest elevation: 91 m (299 ft)
- Population (2022): 626
  - Density: 53.3/km^{2} (138/sq mi)
- Time zone: UTC+01:00 (CET)
  - Summer (DST): UTC+02:00 (CEST)
- Postal code: 61260
- ^{1} French Land Register data, which excludes lakes, ponds, glaciers > 1 km^{2} (0.386 sq mi or 247 acres) and river estuaries.

La Rouge (French pronunciation: [la ʁuʒ]) is a former commune in the Orne department in north-western France. On 1 January 2016, it was merged into the new commune of Val-au-Perche.

== See also ==
- Communes of the Orne department
