= L'Hermitière =

- Part of Val-au-Perche
- Location of L'Hermitière
- Location within France Location within Normandy
- Coordinates: 48°16′58″N 0°38′44″E
- Country: France
- Region: Normandy
- Department: Orne
- Arrondissement: Mortagne-au-Perche
- Canton: Ceton
- Commune: Val-au-Perche
- Area^{1}: 8.34 km^{2} (3.22 sq mi)
- Elevation: 80 m (260 ft)
- Highest elevation: 209 m (686 ft)
- Lowest elevation: 105 m (344 ft)
- Population (2022): 198
  - Density: 23.7/km^{2} (61.5/sq mi)
- Demonym: Hérémitériens
- Time zone: UTC+01:00 (CET)
  - Summer (DST): UTC+02:00 (CEST)
- Postal code: 61260
- ^{1} French Land Register data, which excludes lakes, ponds, glaciers > 1 km^{2} (0.386 sq mi or 247 acres) and river estuaries.

L'Hermitière (French pronunciation: [lɛʁmitjɛʁ]) is a former commune in the Orne department in north-western France. On 1 January 2016, it was merged into the new commune of Val-au-Perche.

== Notable people ==
- Anne-Marie Delcambre (1943-2016), French Islamic studies scholar.

== See also ==
- Communes of the Orne department
