= Saint-Agnan-sur-Erre =

- Part of Val-au-Perche
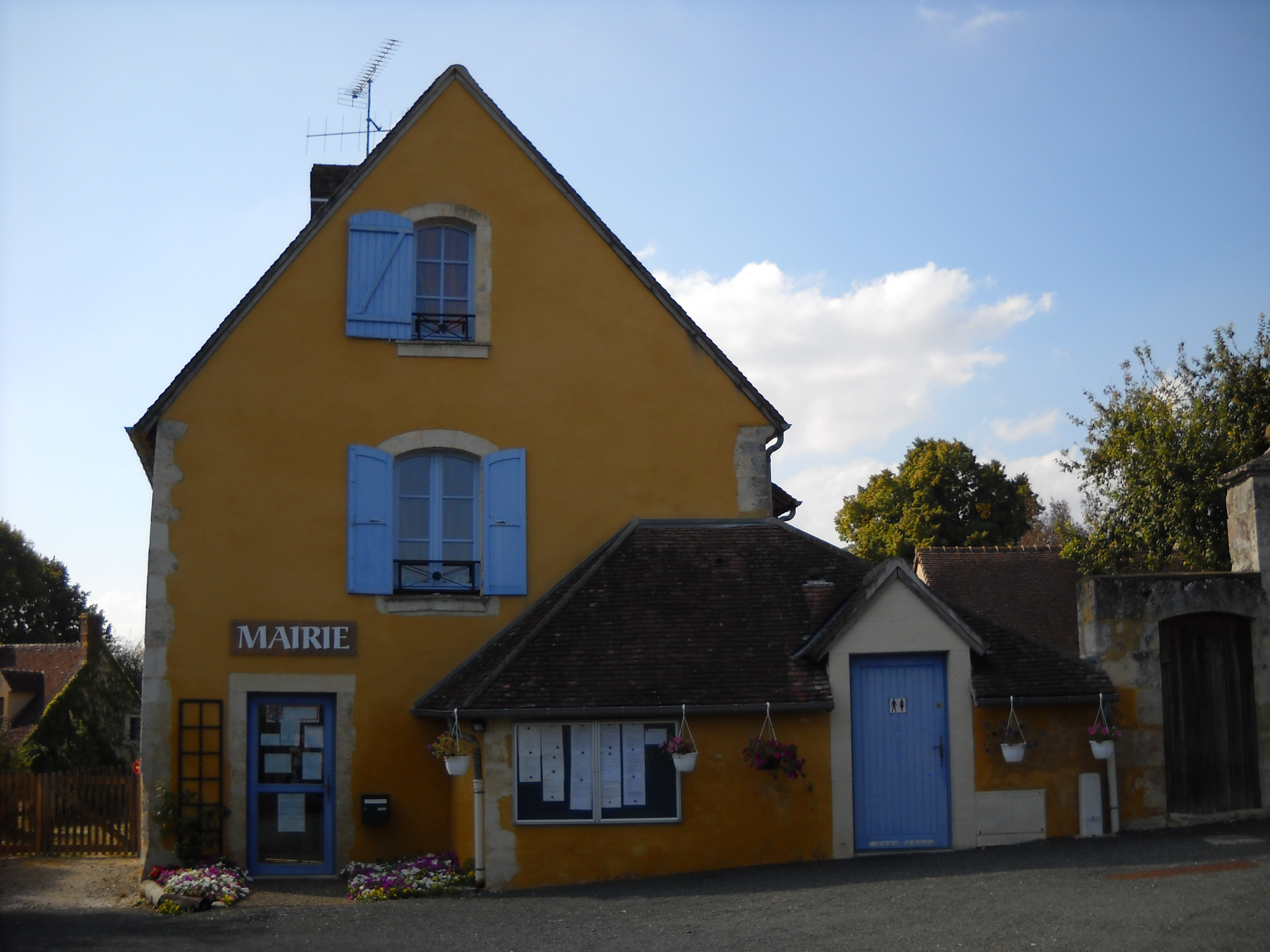
- Town hall
- Location of Saint-Agnan-sur-Erre
- Location within France Location within Normandy
- Coordinates: 48°19′11″N 0°43′38″E
- Country: France
- Region: Normandy
- Department: Orne
- Arrondissement: Mortagne-au-Perche
- Canton: Ceton
- Commune: Val-au-Perche
- Area^{1}: 5.28 km^{2} (2.04 sq mi)
- Elevation: 111 m (364 ft)
- Highest elevation: 208 m (682 ft)
- Lowest elevation: 107 m (351 ft)
- Population (2022): 161
  - Density: 30.5/km^{2} (79.0/sq mi)
- Time zone: UTC+01:00 (CET)
  - Summer (DST): UTC+02:00 (CEST)
- Postal code: 61340
- ^{1} French Land Register data, which excludes lakes, ponds, glaciers > 1 km^{2} (0.386 sq mi or 247 acres) and river estuaries.

Saint-Agnan-sur-Erre (French pronunciation: [sɛ̃t‿aɲɑ̃ syʁ ɛʁ]) is a former commune in the Orne department in north-western France. On 1 January 2016, it was merged into the new commune of Val-au-Perche.

== See also ==
- Communes of the Orne department
