= Le Theil, Orne =

Le Theil
- Part of Val-au-Perche
- Location of Le Theil
- Location within France Location within Normandy
- Coordinates: 48°15′52″N 0°41′20″E
- Country: France
- Region: Normandy
- Department: Orne
- Arrondissement: Mortagne-au-Perche
- Canton: Ceton
- Commune: Val-au-Perche
- Area^{1}: 9.53 km^{2} (3.68 sq mi)
- Highest elevation: 190 m (620 ft)
- Lowest elevation: 90 m (300 ft)
- Population (2022): 1,585
  - Density: 166/km^{2} (431/sq mi)
- Time zone: UTC+01:00 (CET)
  - Summer (DST): UTC+02:00 (CEST)
- Postal code: 61260
- ^{1} French Land Register data, which excludes lakes, ponds, glaciers > 1 km^{2} (0.386 sq mi or 247 acres) and river estuaries.

Le Theil (French pronunciation: [lə tɛj]) is a former commune in the Orne department in north-western France. On 1 January 2016, it was merged into the new commune of Val-au-Perche.

== See also ==
- Communes of the Orne department
