= Delcambre =

Delcambre, Louisiana is a town in the U.S.

Delcambre may also refer to:

- Delcambre Canal, a canal in Louisiana
- Delcambre High School, a high school in Delcambre, Louisiana
- Victor Joseph Delcambre (1770-1858), French General
- Anne-Marie Delcambre (1943-2016), French Islamic studies scholar
