= Mâle, Orne =

Mâle
- Part of Val-au-Perche
- Coat of arms
- Location of Mâle
- Location within France Location within Normandy
- Coordinates: 48°16′19″N 0°44′23″E
- Country: France
- Region: Normandy
- Department: Orne
- Arrondissement: Mortagne-au-Perche
- Canton: Ceton
- Commune: Val-au-Perche
- Area^{1}: 21.90 km^{2} (8.46 sq mi)
- Elevation: 149 m (489 ft)
- Highest elevation: 206 m (676 ft)
- Lowest elevation: 90 m (300 ft)
- Population (2022): 643
  - Density: 29.4/km^{2} (76.0/sq mi)
- Demonym: Mâlois
- Time zone: UTC+01:00 (CET)
  - Summer (DST): UTC+02:00 (CEST)
- Postal code: 61260
- Website: www.male61.com
- ^{1} French Land Register data, which excludes lakes, ponds, glaciers > 1 km^{2} (0.386 sq mi or 247 acres) and river estuaries.

Mâle (French pronunciation: [mal]) is a former commune in the Orne department in north-western France. On 1 January 2016, it was merged into the new commune of Val-au-Perche.

== See also ==
- Communes of the Orne department
