= Saint-Germain-de-la-Coudre =

- Commune
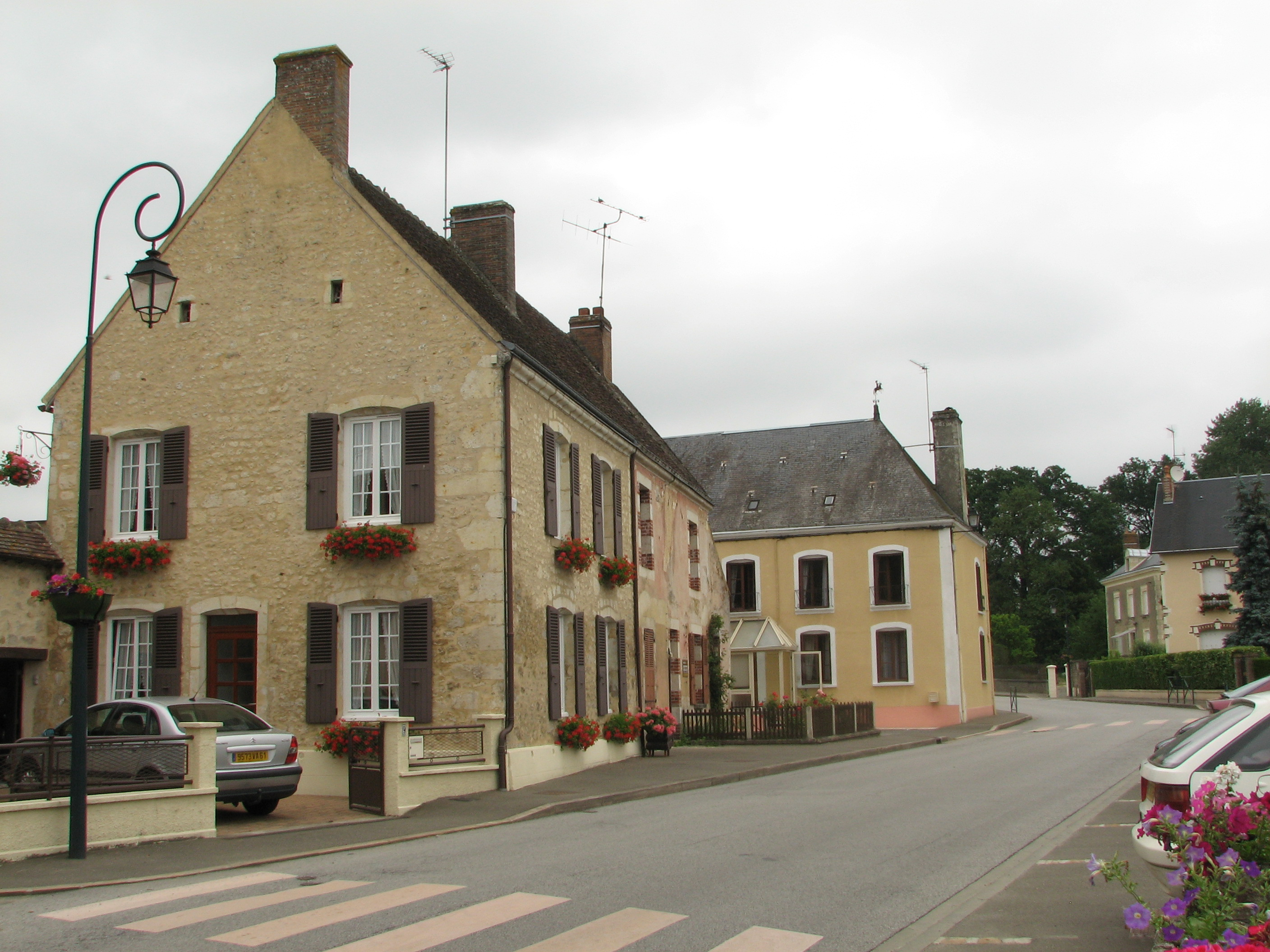
- Street Scene in Saint Germain de la Coudre

- Coat of arms
- Location of Saint-Germain-de-la-Coudre
- Location within France Location within Normandy
- Coordinates: 48°16′52″N 0°36′20″E
- Country: France
- Region: Normandy
- Department: Orne
- Arrondissement: Mortagne-au-Perche
- Canton: Ceton

Government
  - Mayor (2020–2026): Danièle Mary
- Area^{1}: 26.21 km^{2} (10.12 sq mi)
- Elevation: 104 m (341 ft)
- Highest elevation: 203 m (666 ft)
- Lowest elevation: 91 m (299 ft)
- Population (2023): 831
  - Density: 31.7/km^{2} (82.1/sq mi)
- Time zone: UTC+01:00 (CET)
  - Summer (DST): UTC+02:00 (CEST)
- INSEE/Postal code: 61394 /61130
- ^{1} French Land Register data, which excludes lakes, ponds, glaciers > 1 km^{2} (0.386 sq mi or 247 acres) and river estuaries.

Saint-Germain-de-la-Coudre (French pronunciation: [sɛ̃ ʒɛʁmɛ̃ də la kudʁ]) is a commune in the Orne department in north-western France.

== Geography ==
Two rivers, La Coudre and La Même flow through the commune.

== Points of interest ==
=== National heritage sites ===
The Commune has two buildings and areas listed as a Monument historique.

- Saint-Germain Church is a fifteenth century church, it was registered as a monument in 1974.
- Manoir de la Fresnaye a fourteenth century manor house, registered as a Monument historique in 1988.

== See also ==
- Communes of the Orne department
