= Pouvrai =

- Commune
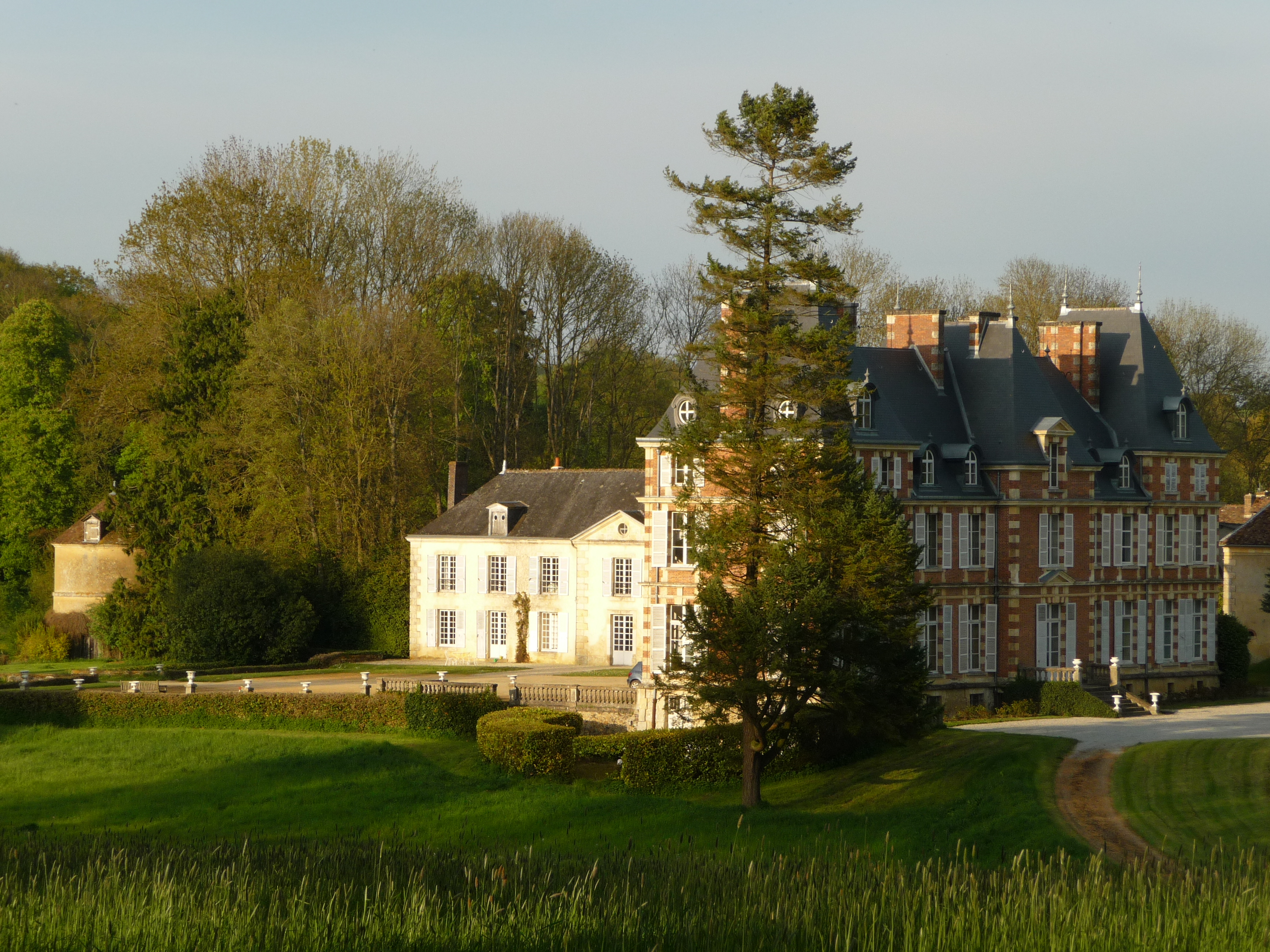
- The chateau in Pouvrai
- Location of Pouvrai
- Location within France Location within Normandy
- Coordinates: 48°16′38″N 0°31′06″E
- Country: France
- Region: Normandy
- Department: Orne
- Arrondissement: Mortagne-au-Perche
- Canton: Ceton
- Intercommunality: Collines du Perche Normand

Government
  - Mayor (2020–2026): Arnaud Loiseau
- Area^{1}: 6.80 km^{2} (2.63 sq mi)
- Elevation: 119 m (390 ft)
- Highest elevation: 192 m (630 ft)
- Lowest elevation: 94 m (308 ft)
- Population (2023): 103
  - Density: 15.1/km^{2} (39.2/sq mi)
- Time zone: UTC+01:00 (CET)
  - Summer (DST): UTC+02:00 (CEST)
- INSEE/Postal code: 61336 /61130
- ^{1} French Land Register data, which excludes lakes, ponds, glaciers > 1 km^{2} (0.386 sq mi or 247 acres) and river estuaries.

Pouvrai (French pronunciation: [puvʁɛ]) is a commune in the Orne department in north-western France.

== Geography ==
The commune is made up of the following collection of villages and hamlets, La Baudonnière and Pouvrai.

La Mortève, is the sole watercourse that runs through the commune.

== See also ==
- Communes of the Orne department
