= Bellou-le-Trichard =

- Commune
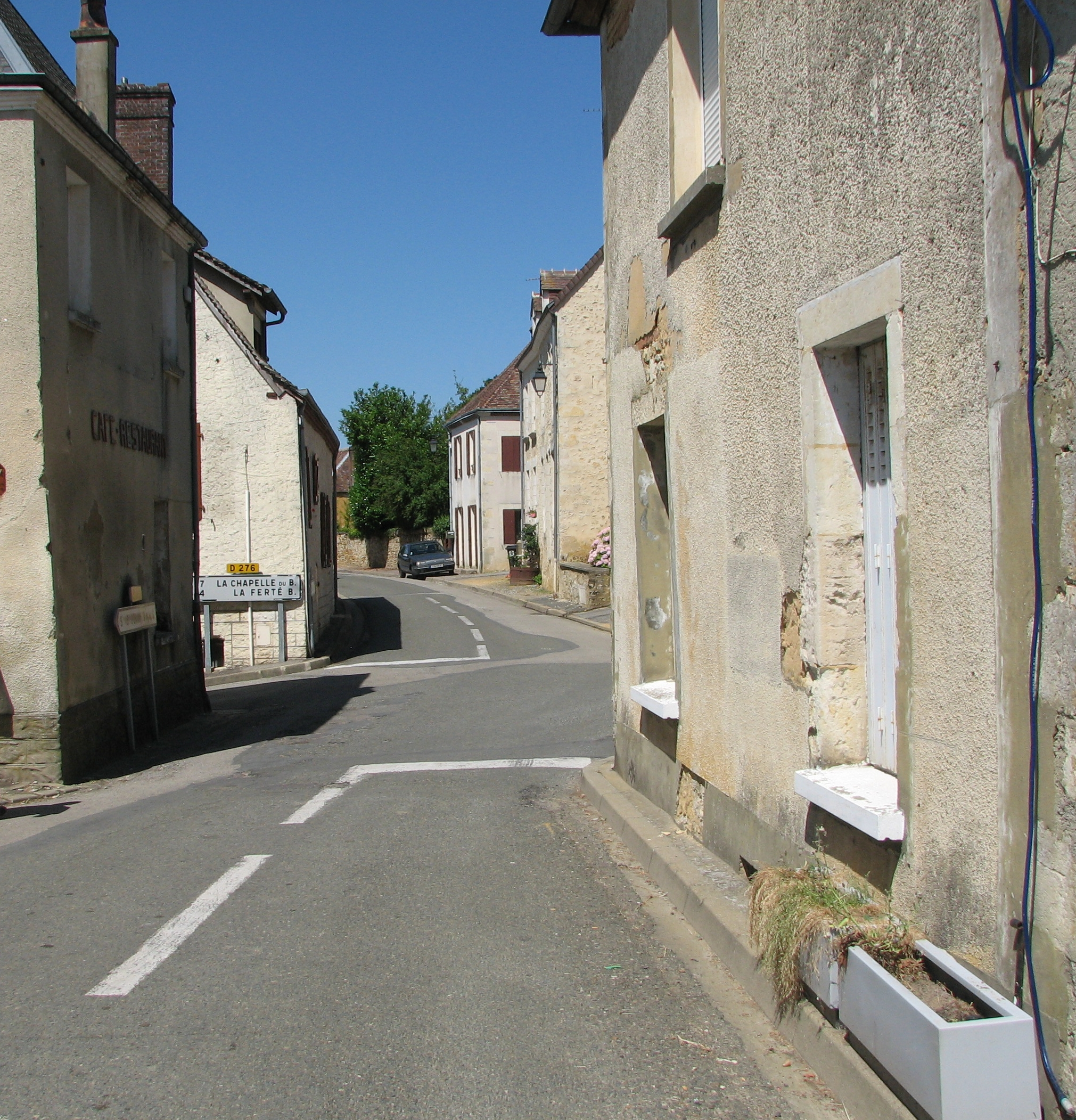
- A street in Bellou-le-Trichard
- Location of Bellou-le-Trichard
- Location within France Location within Normandy
- Coordinates: 48°16′07″N 0°32′50″E
- Country: France
- Region: Normandy
- Department: Orne
- Arrondissement: Mortagne-au-Perche
- Canton: Ceton

Government
  - Mayor (2020–2026): Jean-Pierre Deshayes
- Area^{1}: 9.67 km^{2} (3.73 sq mi)
- Elevation: 180 m (590 ft)
- Highest elevation: 196 m (643 ft)
- Lowest elevation: 110 m (360 ft)
- Population (2023): 195
  - Density: 20.2/km^{2} (52.2/sq mi)
- Time zone: UTC+01:00 (CET)
  - Summer (DST): UTC+02:00 (CEST)
- INSEE/Postal code: 61041 /61130
- ^{1} French Land Register data, which excludes lakes, ponds, glaciers > 1 km^{2} (0.386 sq mi or 247 acres) and river estuaries.

Bellou-le-Trichard (French pronunciation: [bɛlu lə tʁiʃaʁ]) is a commune in the Orne department in northwestern France.

== Geography ==
The commune is made up of the following collection of villages and hamlets, Gevraise, Courmartin, Bellou-le-Trichard, La Joustière, Les Arpens, La Durandière and La ville.

== Population ==
Historical population
| Year | Pop. | ±% p.a. |
|---|---|---|
| 1968 | 274 | — |
| 1975 | 221 | −3.02% |
| 1982 | 190 | −2.14% |
| 1990 | 180 | −0.67% |
| 1999 | 202 | +1.29% |
| 2007 | 242 | +2.28% |
| 2012 | 233 | −0.76% |
| 2017 | 214 | −1.69% |
| 2023 | 195 | −1.54% |
Source: INSEE

== See also ==
- Communes of the Orne department
