= Chemilli =

- Commune
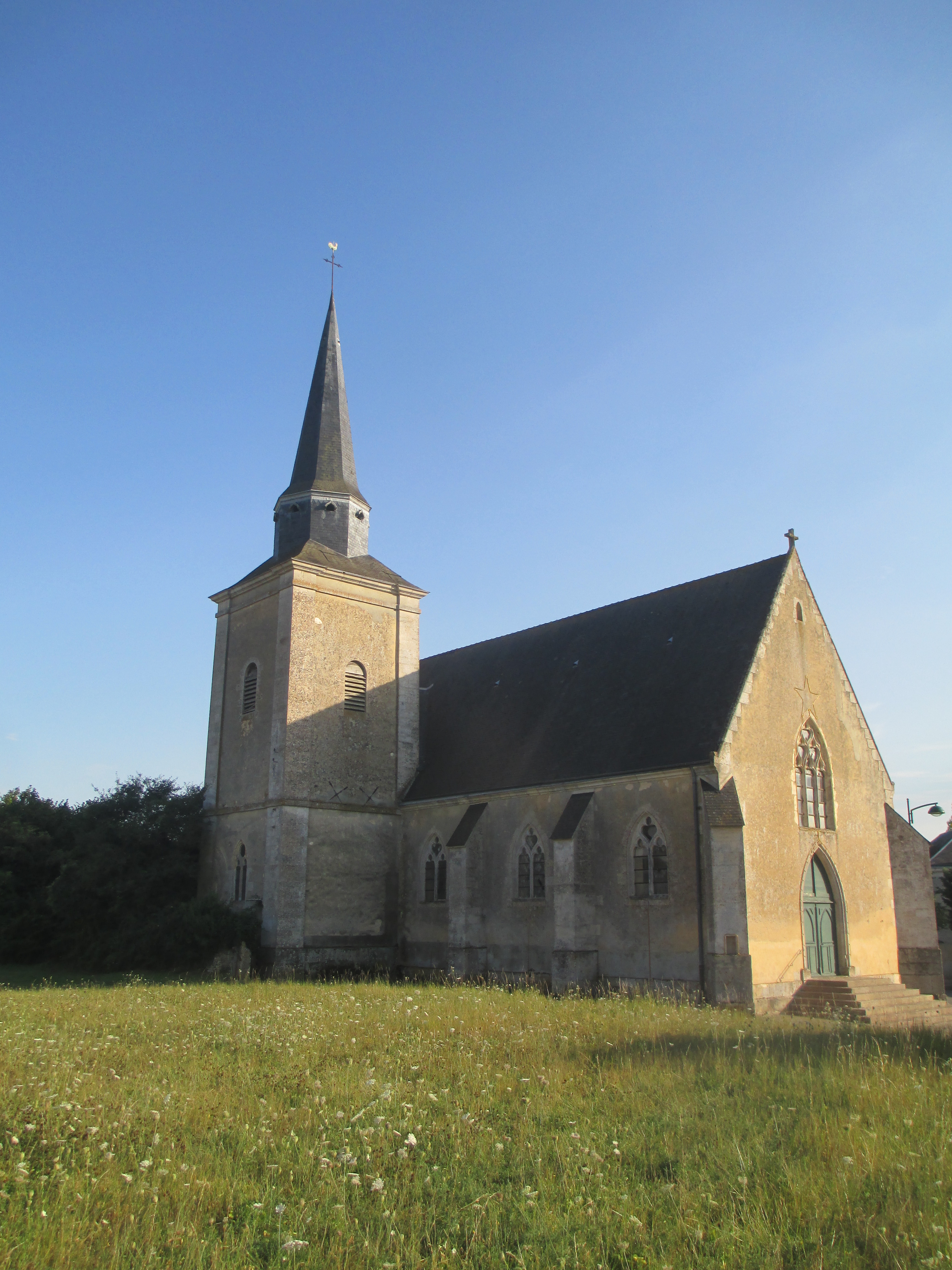
- The church in Chemilli

- Coat of arms
- Location of Chemilli
- Location within France Location within Normandy
- Coordinates: 48°21′52″N 0°26′41″E
- Country: France
- Region: Normandy
- Department: Orne
- Arrondissement: Mortagne-au-Perche
- Canton: Ceton
- Intercommunality: Collines du Perche Normand

Government
  - Mayor (2020–2026): Anthony Savale
- Area^{1}: 10.92 km^{2} (4.22 sq mi)
- Elevation: 107 m (351 ft)
- Highest elevation: 143 m (469 ft)
- Lowest elevation: 93 m (305 ft)
- Population (2023): 170
  - Density: 16/km^{2} (40/sq mi)
- Time zone: UTC+01:00 (CET)
  - Summer (DST): UTC+02:00 (CEST)
- INSEE/Postal code: 61105 /61360
- ^{1} French Land Register data, which excludes lakes, ponds, glaciers > 1 km^{2} (0.386 sq mi or 247 acres) and river estuaries.

Chemilli (French pronunciation: [ʃəmiji]) is a commune in the Orne department in north-western France.

== Geography ==
The commune is made up of the following collection of villages and hamlets, Le Grand Clinchamps, Chemilli and Le Pérou.

Two streams, both called the Ruisseau du plessis, flow through the commune.

== Notable buildings and places ==
The Montperthuis Gardens is a garden that was opened to the public in 2015, and features over 300 varieties of Roses. The garden was classed as a Jardins remarquables in 2021 by the Ministry of Culture and the Comité des Parcs et Jardins de France.

== See also ==
- Communes of the Orne department
