= Saint-Fulgent-des-Ormes =

- Commune
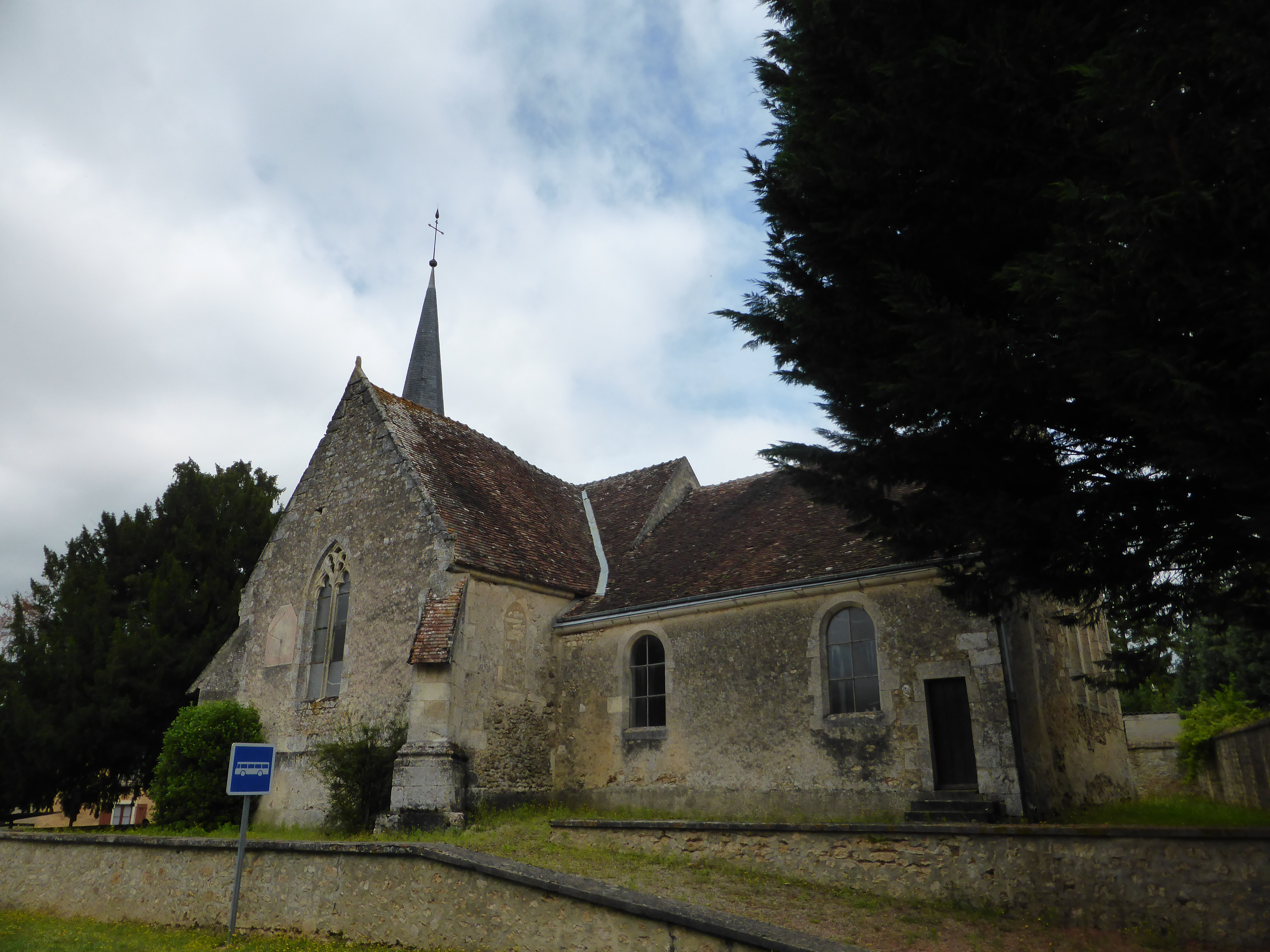
- The church in Saint-Fulgent-des-Ormes
- Location of Saint-Fulgent-des-Ormes
- Location within France Location within Normandy
- Coordinates: 48°19′09″N 0°26′53″E
- Country: France
- Region: Normandy
- Department: Orne
- Arrondissement: Mortagne-au-Perche
- Canton: Ceton

Government
  - Mayor (2020–2026): Amale El Khaledi
- Area^{1}: 8.32 km^{2} (3.21 sq mi)
- Highest elevation: 125 m (410 ft)
- Lowest elevation: 76 m (249 ft)
- Population (2023): 172
  - Density: 20.7/km^{2} (53.5/sq mi)
- Time zone: UTC+01:00 (CET)
  - Summer (DST): UTC+02:00 (CEST)
- INSEE/Postal code: 61388 /61130
- ^{1} French Land Register data, which excludes lakes, ponds, glaciers > 1 km^{2} (0.386 sq mi or 247 acres) and river estuaries.

Saint-Fulgent-des-Ormes (French pronunciation: [sɛ̃ fylʒɑ̃ de.z‿ɔʁm]) is a commune in the Orne department in north-western France.

== Geography ==
The river the l'Orne Saosnoise flows through the commune.

== See also ==
- Communes of the Orne department
