= Dame-Marie, Orne =

Dame-Marie
- Commune
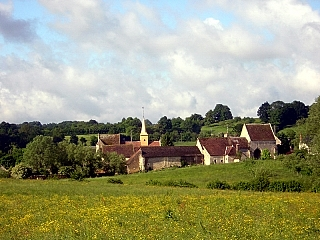
- A general view of Dame-Marie
- Location of Dame-Marie
- Location within France Location within Normandy
- Coordinates: 48°21′21″N 0°36′58″E
- Country: France
- Region: Normandy
- Department: Orne
- Arrondissement: Mortagne-au-Perche
- Canton: Ceton
- Intercommunality: Collines du Perche Normand

Government
  - Mayor (2020–2026): Angélique Creusier
- Area^{1}: 13.27 km^{2} (5.12 sq mi)
- Elevation: 150 m (490 ft)
- Highest elevation: 216 m (709 ft)
- Lowest elevation: 121 m (397 ft)
- Population (2023): 167
  - Density: 12.6/km^{2} (32.6/sq mi)
- Demonym: Dominomariens
- Time zone: UTC+01:00 (CET)
  - Summer (DST): UTC+02:00 (CEST)
- INSEE/Postal code: 61142 /61130
- ^{1} French Land Register data, which excludes lakes, ponds, glaciers > 1 km^{2} (0.386 sq mi or 247 acres) and river estuaries.

Dame-Marie (French pronunciation: [dam maʁi]) is a commune in the Orne department in north-western France populated by 170 inhabitants.

== Geography ==
The commune is made up of the following collection of villages and hamlets, Couasme, La Renardière, Croix Tarenne, La Liardière, Dame-Marie, Le Bouhoux, Clos Rohard and Le Vivier.

A river, La Rozière flows through the commune. in addition two streams traverse the commune, Ruisseau du pont aux ânes and Ruisseau de dame-marie.

== Points of interest ==
=== National Heritage Sites ===
- Prioral enclosure is remaining church and entrance gates of a priory that once was a dependency of Jumièges Abbey, it was registered as a historical monument in 1997.

== See also ==
- Communes of the Orne department
