= Val-au-Perche =

- Commune
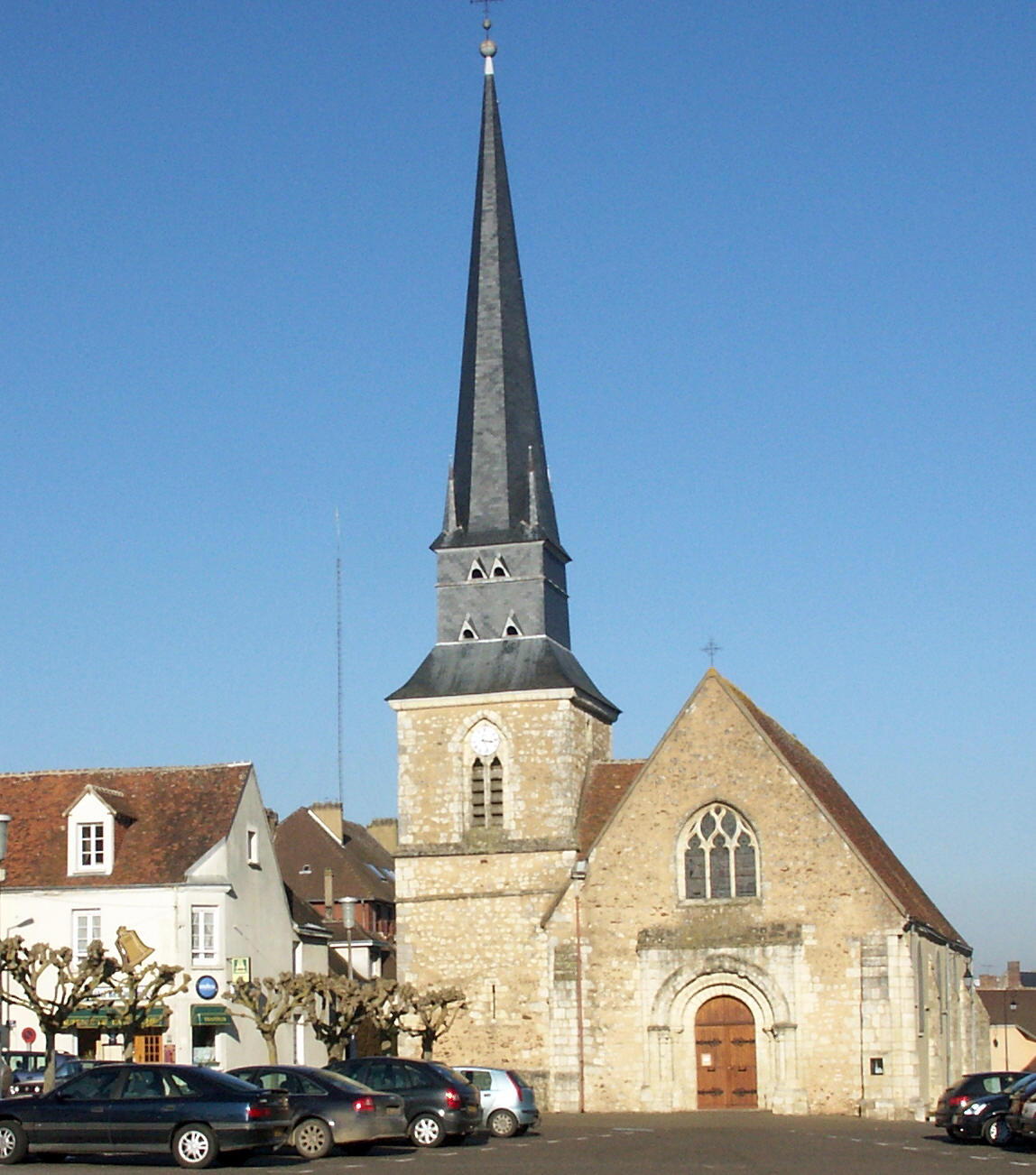
- The church in Le Theil
- Location of Val-au-Perche
- Location within France Location within Normandy
- Coordinates: 48°15′54″N 0°41′24″E
- Country: France
- Region: Normandy
- Department: Orne
- Arrondissement: Mortagne-au-Perche
- Canton: Ceton
- Intercommunality: Collines du Perche Normand

Government
  - Mayor (2020–2026): Sébastien Thirouard
- Area^{1}: 63.26 km^{2} (24.42 sq mi)
- Population (2023): 3,336
  - Density: 52.73/km^{2} (136.6/sq mi)
- Time zone: UTC+01:00 (CET)
  - Summer (DST): UTC+02:00 (CEST)
- INSEE/Postal code: 61484 /61260, 61130, 61340
- ^{1} French Land Register data, which excludes lakes, ponds, glaciers > 1 km^{2} (0.386 sq mi or 247 acres) and river estuaries.

Val-au-Perche (French pronunciation: [val o pɛʁʃ]) is a commune in the department of Orne, northwestern France. The municipality was established on 1 January 2016 by merger of the former communes of Gémages, L'Hermitière, Mâle, La Rouge, Saint-Agnan-sur-Erre and Le Theil (the seat).

== Geography ==
Five rivers, La Coudre, La Rozière, L'Erre, La Rougette and Huisne flow through the commune.

== Population ==
Population data refer to the area corresponding with the commune as of January 2025.

Historical population
Year	Pop.	±% p.a.
1968	2,705	—
1975	3,012	+1.55%
1982	3,421	+1.84%
1990	3,760	+1.19%
1999	3,776	+0.05%
2007	3,872	+0.31%
2012	3,823	−0.25%
2017	3,620	−1.09%
2023	3,336	−1.35%
Source: INSEE

== Notable buildings and places ==
Parc du Château de Lorière is an English styled landscaped park built created in 1850 surrounding Loriere Castle which is open to the public. It is classified as a Jardins remarquables by the Ministry of Culture and the Comité des Parcs et Jardins de France.

=== National heritage sites ===
The Commune has 8 buildings and areas listed as a Monument historique.

- Saint-Martin church a twelfth Century church in Val-au-Perche.
- Paper Mill on the bank of the Huisne which was rebuilt in 1881 from an original flour mill, mainly to supply paper to large cigarette paper factory in the neighboring town of Theil.
- Gauberdière Manor a fifteenth Century Manor in La Rouge.
- Chateau de l'Hermitière an eighteenth Century cahteau in L'Hermitière .
- Chateau de Launay a sixteenth Century chateau in Male .
- Saint-Martin church a twelfth Century church in Gémages.
- Chateau de Loriere an eighteenth Century chateau in La Rouge.
- The Church of Our Lady of the Assumption a fifteenth Century church in Le Theil.

== Transport ==
The commune has a Railway station called Theil - La Rouge, that was opened in 1857 and serves part of the Paris–Brest line.

== See also ==
- Communes of the Orne department
