= Saint-Hilaire-sur-Erre =

- Commune
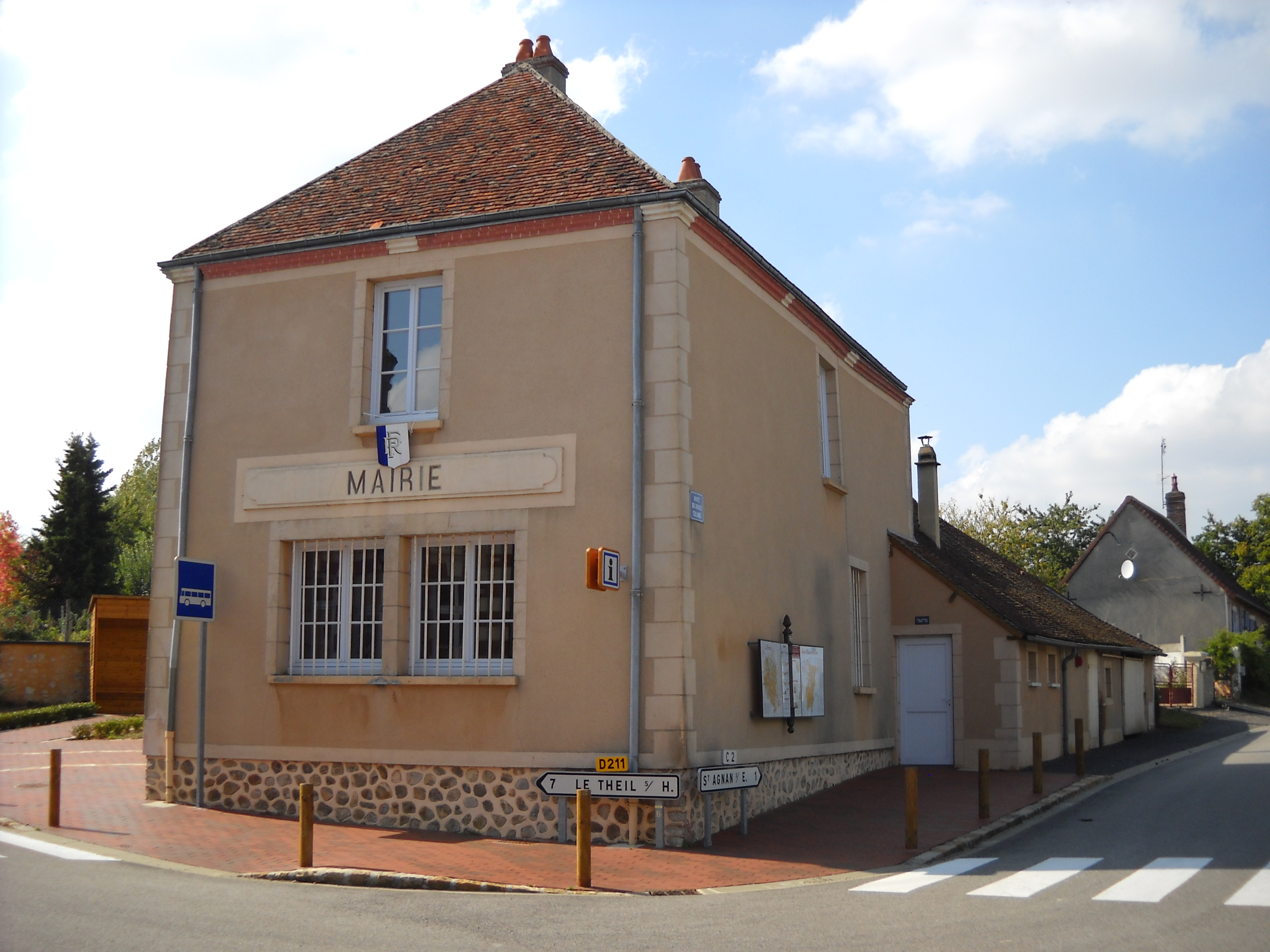
- The town hall in Saint-Hilaire-sur-Erre
- Location of Saint-Hilaire-sur-Erre
- Location within France Location within Normandy
- Coordinates: 48°18′48″N 0°44′21″E
- Country: France
- Region: Normandy
- Department: Orne
- Arrondissement: Mortagne-au-Perche
- Canton: Ceton

Government
  - Mayor (2020–2026): Claudine Bereau
- Area^{1}: 15.12 km^{2} (5.84 sq mi)
- Elevation: 130 m (430 ft)
- Highest elevation: 188 m (617 ft)
- Lowest elevation: 96 m (315 ft)
- Population (2023): 484
  - Density: 32.0/km^{2} (82.9/sq mi)
- Time zone: UTC+01:00 (CET)
  - Summer (DST): UTC+02:00 (CEST)
- INSEE/Postal code: 61405 /61340
- ^{1} French Land Register data, which excludes lakes, ponds, glaciers > 1 km^{2} (0.386 sq mi or 247 acres) and river estuaries.

Saint-Hilaire-sur-Erre (French pronunciation: [sɛ̃t‿ilɛːʁ syʁ ɛʁ]) is a commune in the Orne department in north-western France.

== Geography ==
Three rivers the Huisne, L'Erre and La Chèvre, flow through the commune.

== Points of interest ==
=== National heritage sites ===
The Commune has four buildings and areas listed as a Monument historique.

- Malaise Manor is a sixteenth century Manor house which was registered as a monument in 1990.
- Epinay Manor a fifteenth century church, registered as a Monument historique in 1990.

== See also ==
- Communes of the Orne department
