= Anne-Marie Delcambre =

French Islamic studies scholar (1943 – 2016)

Anne-Marie Delcambre (26 June 1943, in L'Hermitière – 2 January 2016 in Saint-James) was a French Islamic studies scholar and Arabist. She obtained a Paris-Sorbonne University postgraduate doctorate in Islamic studies, as well as a doctorate in Law studies.

Anne-Marie Delcambre taught Arabic language at the Lycée Louis-le-Grand and contributed to the Encyclopædia of Islam by writing articles. She caused controversy among Islamic apologists by publishing translations of Islamic texts that they had carefully avoided mentioning in their works and in the media.

== Published works ==
Anne-Marie Delcambre wrote mainly on the subject of Islamic civilization. Her work Mahomet: la parole d’Allah became one of the top five best-sellers of the Découvertes Gallimard collection. Other works include:

- Méthode d'arabe Linguaphone, Linguaphone Institute, 1979
- Mahomet, Desclée de Brouwer, 1999
- L'Islam, La Découverte, 2001
- Enquêtes sur l'islam : En hommage à Antoine Moussali, collectif, Desclée de Brouwer, 2004
- La schizophrénie de l'Islam, Desclée de Brouwer, 2006
- Soufi ou mufti ? : Quel avenir pour l'islam ?, Desclée de Brouwer, 2007. Préfacé par Daniel Pipes
- Inside Islam (translation of L'Islam des interdits, Desclée de Brouwer, 2008)
