= Origny-le-Roux =

- Commune
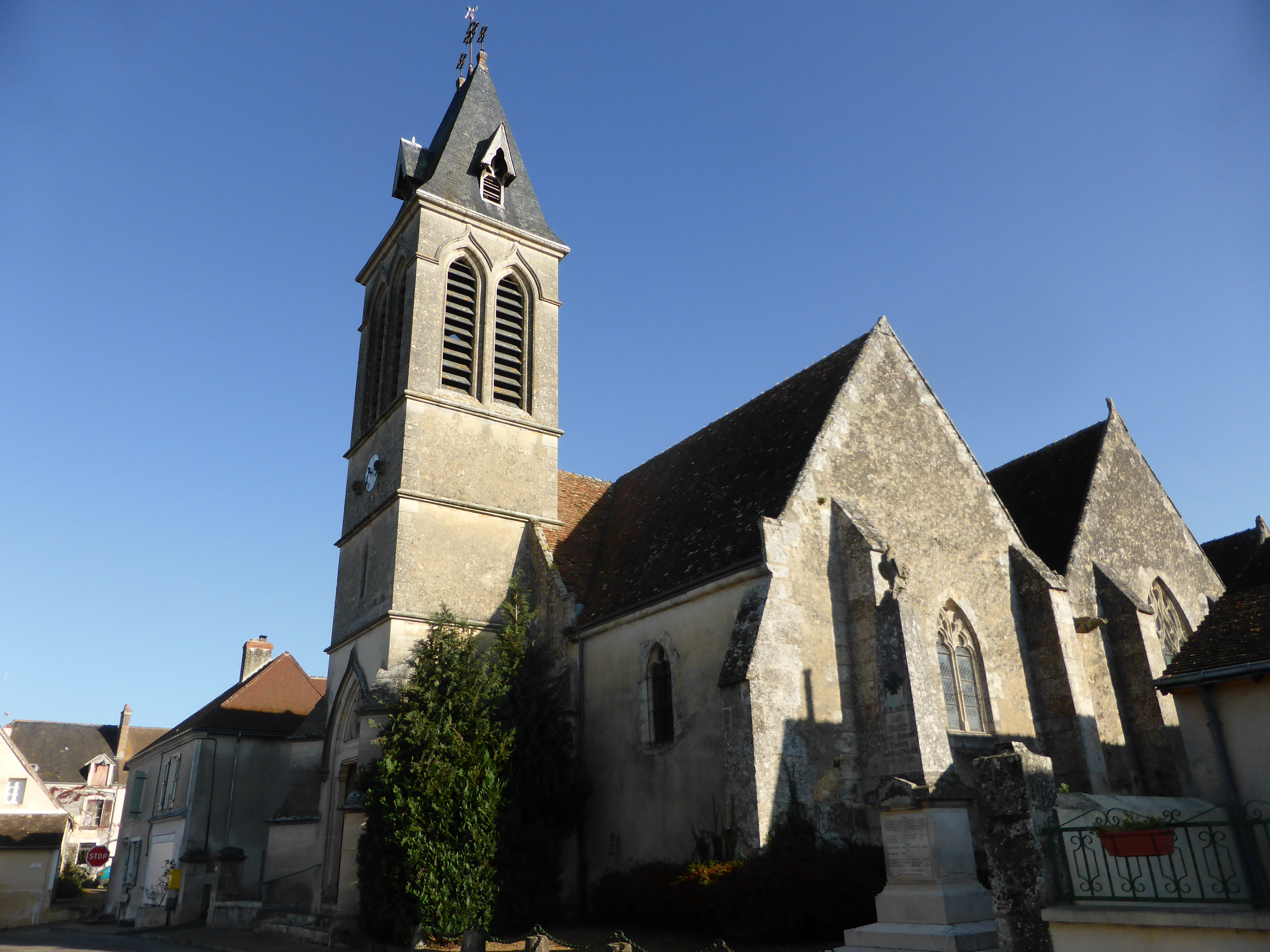
- The church in Origny-le-Roux
- Location of Origny-le-Roux
- Location within France Location within Normandy
- Coordinates: 48°20′44″N 0°25′16″E
- Country: France
- Region: Normandy
- Department: Orne
- Arrondissement: Mortagne-au-Perche
- Canton: Ceton
- Intercommunality: Maine Saosnois

Government
  - Mayor (2020–2026): Geneviève Aubry
- Area^{1}: 14.12 km^{2} (5.45 sq mi)
- Elevation: 80 m (260 ft)
- Highest elevation: 142 m (466 ft)
- Lowest elevation: 79 m (259 ft)
- Population (2023): 251
  - Density: 17.8/km^{2} (46.0/sq mi)
- Time zone: UTC+01:00 (CET)
  - Summer (DST): UTC+02:00 (CEST)
- INSEE/Postal code: 61319 /61130
- ^{1} French Land Register data, which excludes lakes, ponds, glaciers > 1 km^{2} (0.386 sq mi or 247 acres) and river estuaries.

Origny-le-Roux (French pronunciation: [ɔʁiɲi lə ʁu]) is a commune in the Orne department in north-western France.

== Geography ==
The commune is made up of the following collection of villages and hamlets, Le Marais, Origny-le-Roux, Le Plessis, Meslin, Méaton and La Jarrias.

The river the l'Orne Saosnoise flows through the commune. In addition a stream, called the Ruisseau du plessis, also flows through the commune.

== Points of interest ==
=== National heritage sites ===
- Château de Chèreperrine an eighteenth century chateau, featuring a ground floor decorated and furnished by Nicolas Heurtaut, it was registered as a Monument historique in 1989.

== See also ==
- Communes of the Orne department
