= Suré =

- Commune
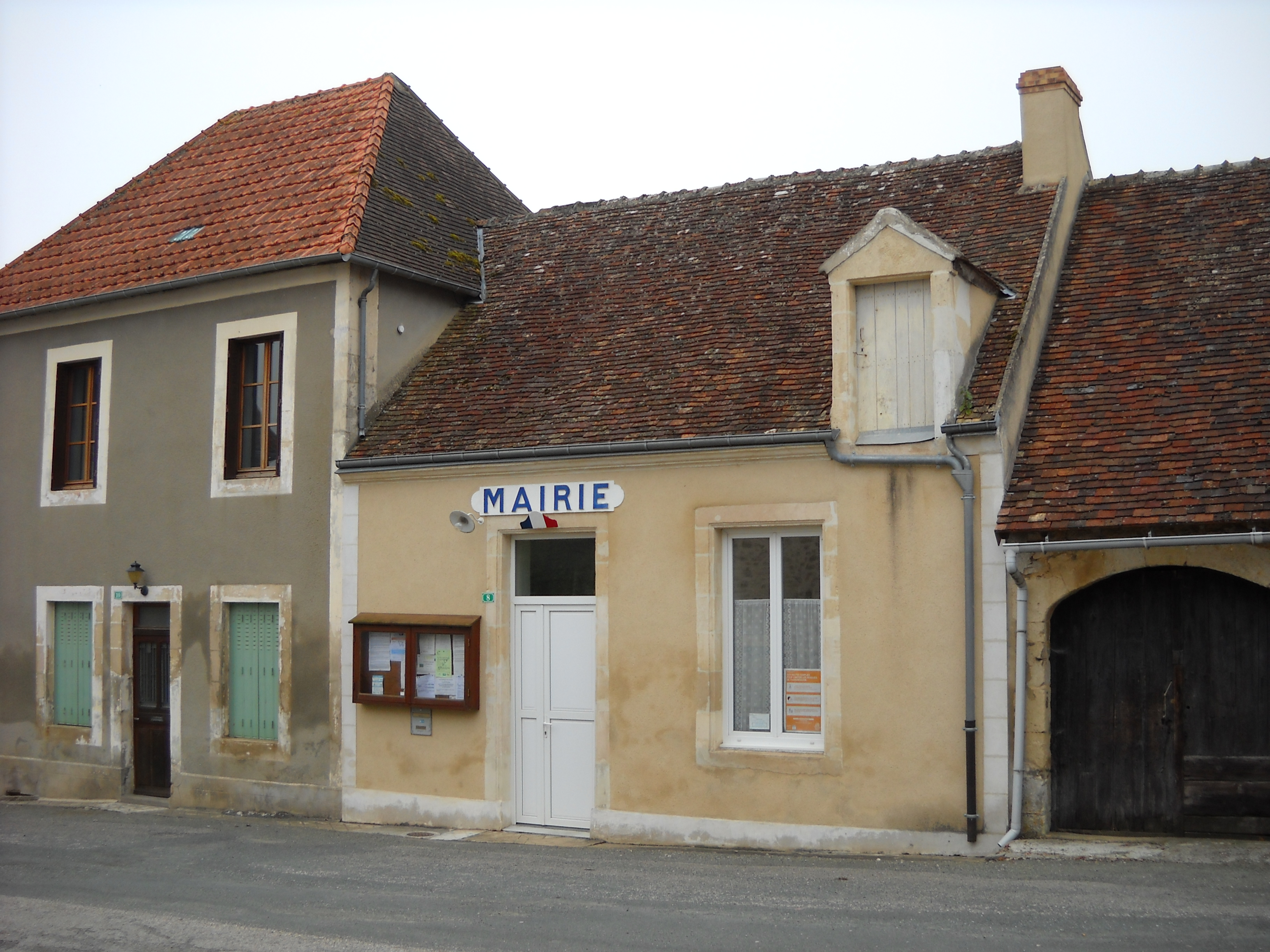
- The town hall in Suré

- Coat of arms
- Location of Suré
- Location within France Location within Normandy
- Coordinates: 48°22′11″N 0°23′56″E
- Country: France
- Region: Normandy
- Department: Orne
- Arrondissement: Mortagne-au-Perche
- Canton: Ceton
- Intercommunality: Maine Saosnois

Government
  - Mayor (2020–2026): Bernard Michel
- Area^{1}: 17.44 km^{2} (6.73 sq mi)
- Elevation: 138 m (453 ft)
- Highest elevation: 181 m (594 ft)
- Lowest elevation: 93 m (305 ft)
- Population (2023): 277
  - Density: 15.9/km^{2} (41.1/sq mi)
- Time zone: UTC+01:00 (CET)
  - Summer (DST): UTC+02:00 (CEST)
- INSEE/Postal code: 61476 /61360
- ^{1} French Land Register data, which excludes lakes, ponds, glaciers > 1 km^{2} (0.386 sq mi or 247 acres) and river estuaries.

Suré (French pronunciation: [syʁe]) is a commune in the Orne department in north-western France.

== Geography ==
The river the l'Orne Saosnoise flows through the commune.

== See also ==
- Communes of the Orne department
