= Canton of Ceton =

Administrative division of the French government

Coordinates: 48.23°N 0.75°E

The canton of Ceton is an administrative division of the Orne department, northwestern France. It was created at the French canton reorganisation which came into effect in March 2015. Its seat is in Ceton.

It consists of the following communes:

1. Appenai-sous-Bellême
2. Belforêt-en-Perche
3. Bellême
4. Bellou-le-Trichard
5. Ceton
6. La Chapelle-Souëf
7. Chemilli
8. Dame-Marie
9. Igé
10. Origny-le-Roux
11. Pouvrai
12. Saint-Fulgent-des-Ormes
13. Saint-Germain-de-la-Coudre
14. Saint-Hilaire-sur-Erre
15. Saint-Martin-du-Vieux-Bellême
16. Suré
17. Val-au-Perche
18. Vaunoise
