= Tournai-sur-Dive =

- Commune
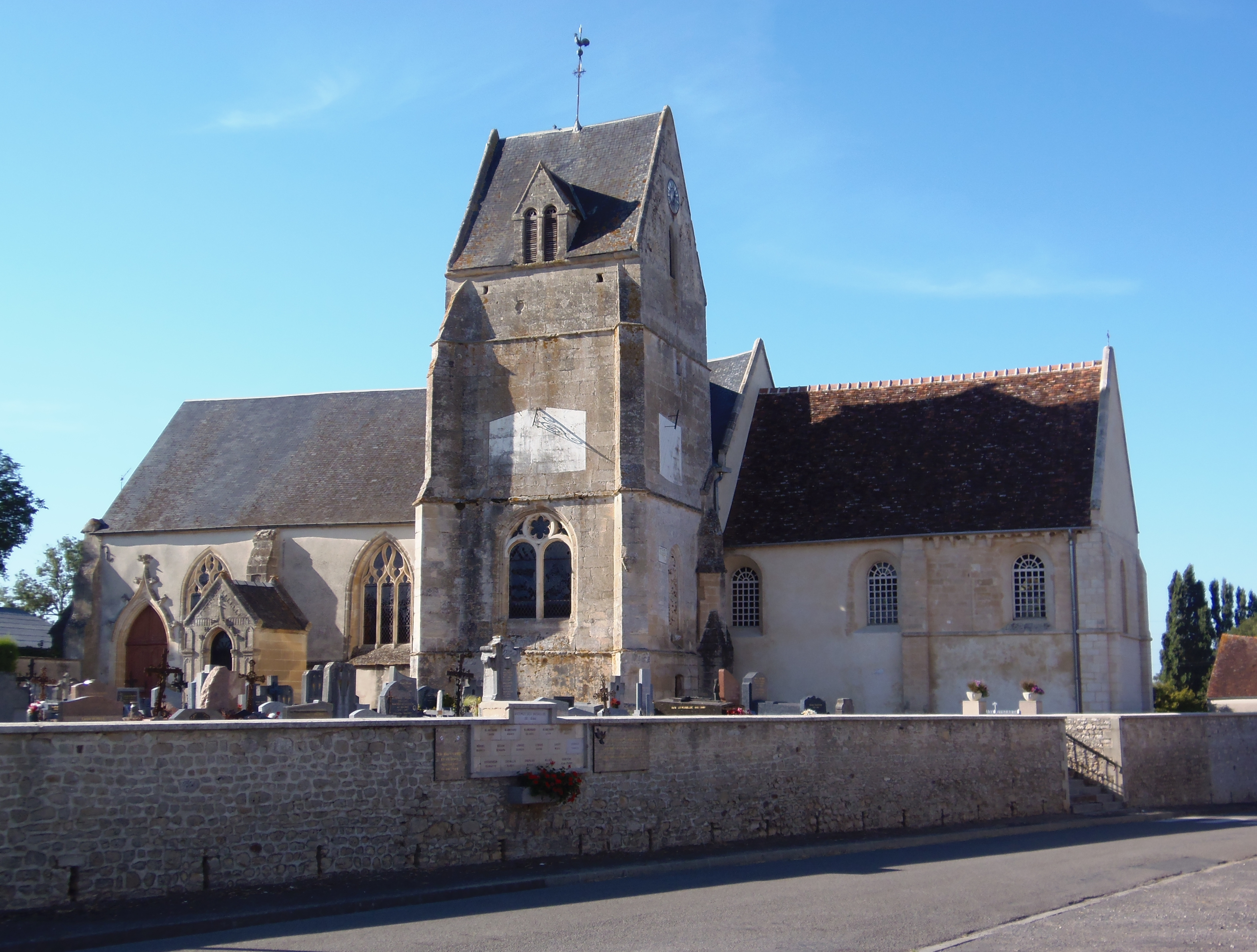
- The church in Tournai-sur-Dive
- Location of Tournai-sur-Dive
- Location within France Location within Normandy
- Coordinates: 48°48′44″N 0°02′48″E
- Country: France
- Region: Normandy
- Department: Orne
- Arrondissement: Argentan
- Canton: Argentan-2
- Intercommunality: Terres d'Argentan Interco

Government
  - Mayor (2020–2026): Xavier Schneider
- Area^{1}: 12.40 km^{2} (4.79 sq mi)
- Elevation: 107 m (351 ft)
- Highest elevation: 195 m (640 ft)
- Lowest elevation: 80 m (260 ft)
- Population (2023): 295
  - Density: 23.8/km^{2} (61.6/sq mi)
- Time zone: UTC+01:00 (CET)
  - Summer (DST): UTC+02:00 (CEST)
- INSEE/Postal code: 61490 /61160
- ^{1} French Land Register data, which excludes lakes, ponds, glaciers > 1 km^{2} (0.386 sq mi or 247 acres) and river estuaries.

Tournai-sur-Dive (French pronunciation: [tuʁnɛ syʁ div], literally Tournai on Dive) is a commune in the Orne department in north-western France.

== Geography ==
The commune is made up of the following collection of villages and hamlets, Montmilcent, Miguillaume and Tournai-sur-Dive.

The commune has the River Dives running through it and two streams Pont aux Anes & the Foulbec.

== Tournai-sur Dives during the Second World War ==
At the centre of the Falaise Pocket, the small village of TOURNAI- sur- DIVES took a very important part in the outcome of the Battle of Normandy. Just 23 inhabitants stayed in their village with the priest of the commune (parish): l'Abbé Launay. Some German soldiers lived there as well with their officer. Everybody was exhausted due to the heat of July and the non-stop bombing of the Allies. Finally, the priest and the German officer decided to both go to the Canadian and Polish battle line near Trun and ask to surrender. They travelled in a tank bearing the red cross and white flag. However, German officer became afraid to meet Polish soldiers because of their reputation of not taking prisoners, so they changed their objective and went to the American unit in Chambois. There, Americans kept the German officer as hostage and the abbey returned to Tournai-sur-Dives where all the Germans gave themselves up. It was the first day of the end of the Battle of Normandy; 21 August 1944.

== Notable buildings and places ==
=== National heritage sites ===
Menhir dit la Pierre au Bordeu is a Neolithic Menhir classified as a Monument historique in 1938.

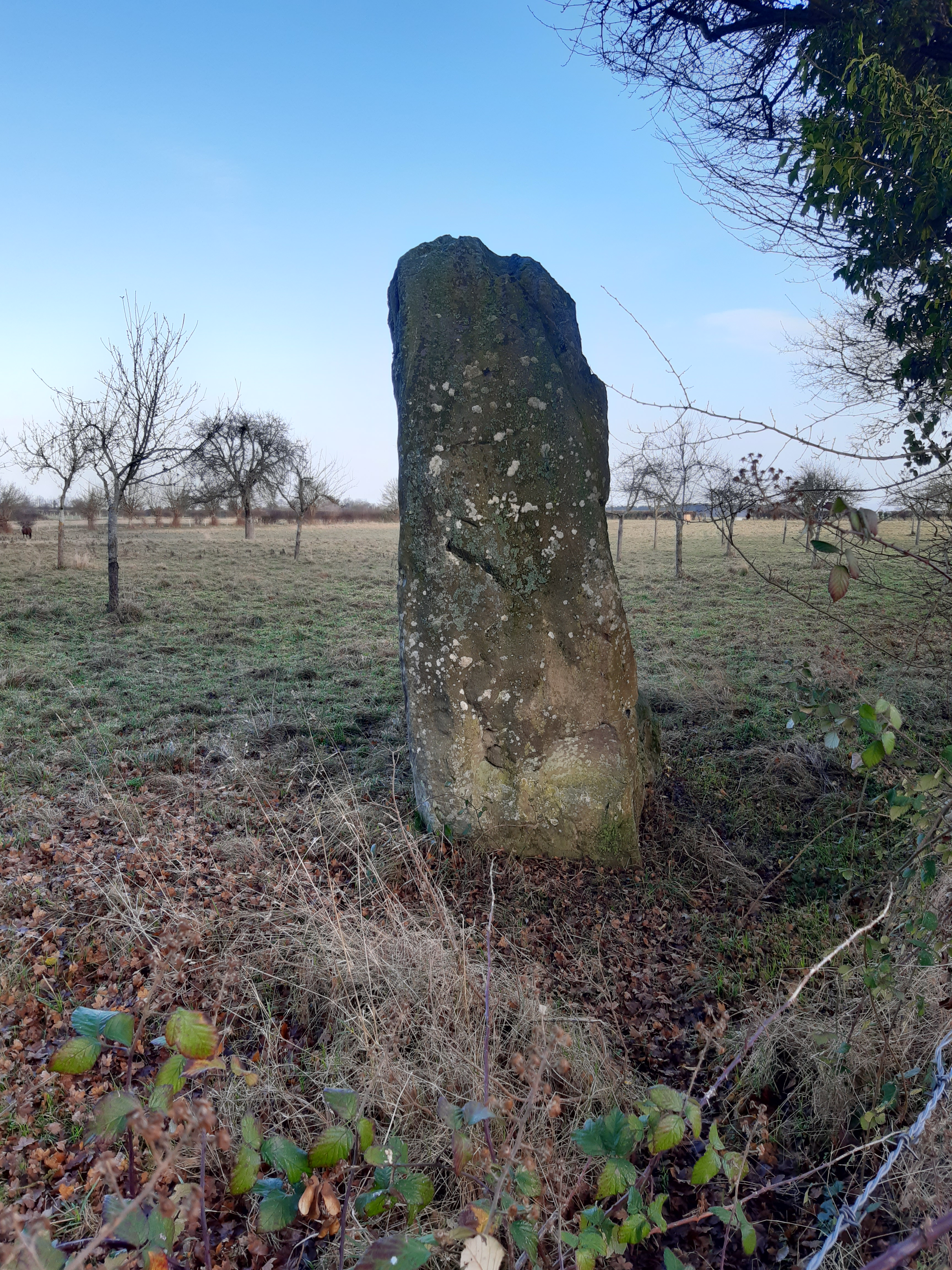
Pierre au Bordeu

== Sport ==
The commune has an 18 hole golf course, Golf du Bief.

== See also ==
- Communes of the Orne department
- The Battle of Normandy
- Falaise Pocket
