= Villedieu-lès-Bailleul =

- Commune
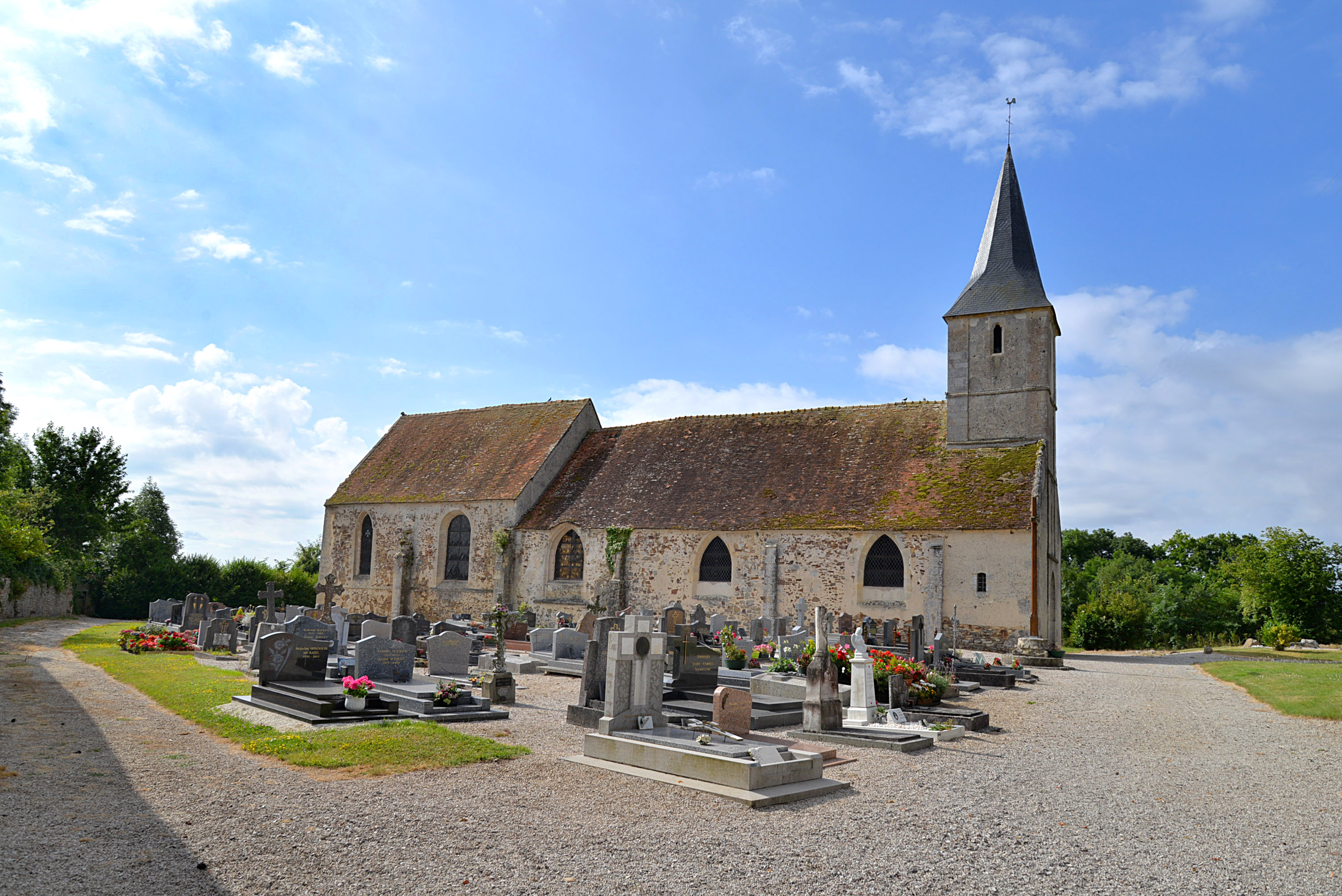
- The church in Villedieu-lès-Bailleul
- Location of Villedieu-lès-Bailleul
- Location within France Location within Normandy
- Coordinates: 48°48′53″N 0°01′14″E
- Country: France
- Region: Normandy
- Department: Orne
- Arrondissement: Argentan
- Canton: Argentan-2
- Intercommunality: Terres d'Argentan Interco

Government
  - Mayor (2020–2026): Franck Bardin
- Area^{1}: 4.71 km^{2} (1.82 sq mi)
- Elevation: 200 m (660 ft)
- Highest elevation: 219 m (719 ft)
- Lowest elevation: 110 m (360 ft)
- Population (2023): 203
  - Density: 43.1/km^{2} (112/sq mi)
- Demonym: Théocitadins
- Time zone: UTC+01:00 (CET)
  - Summer (DST): UTC+02:00 (CEST)
- INSEE/Postal code: 61505 /61160
- ^{1} French Land Register data, which excludes lakes, ponds, glaciers > 1 km^{2} (0.386 sq mi or 247 acres) and river estuaries.

Villedieu-lès-Bailleul (French pronunciation: [vildjø lɛ bajœl], literally Villedieu near Bailleul) is a commune in the Orne department in north-western France.

== Geography ==
The Pont aux Anes stream is the only watercourse that runs through the commune.

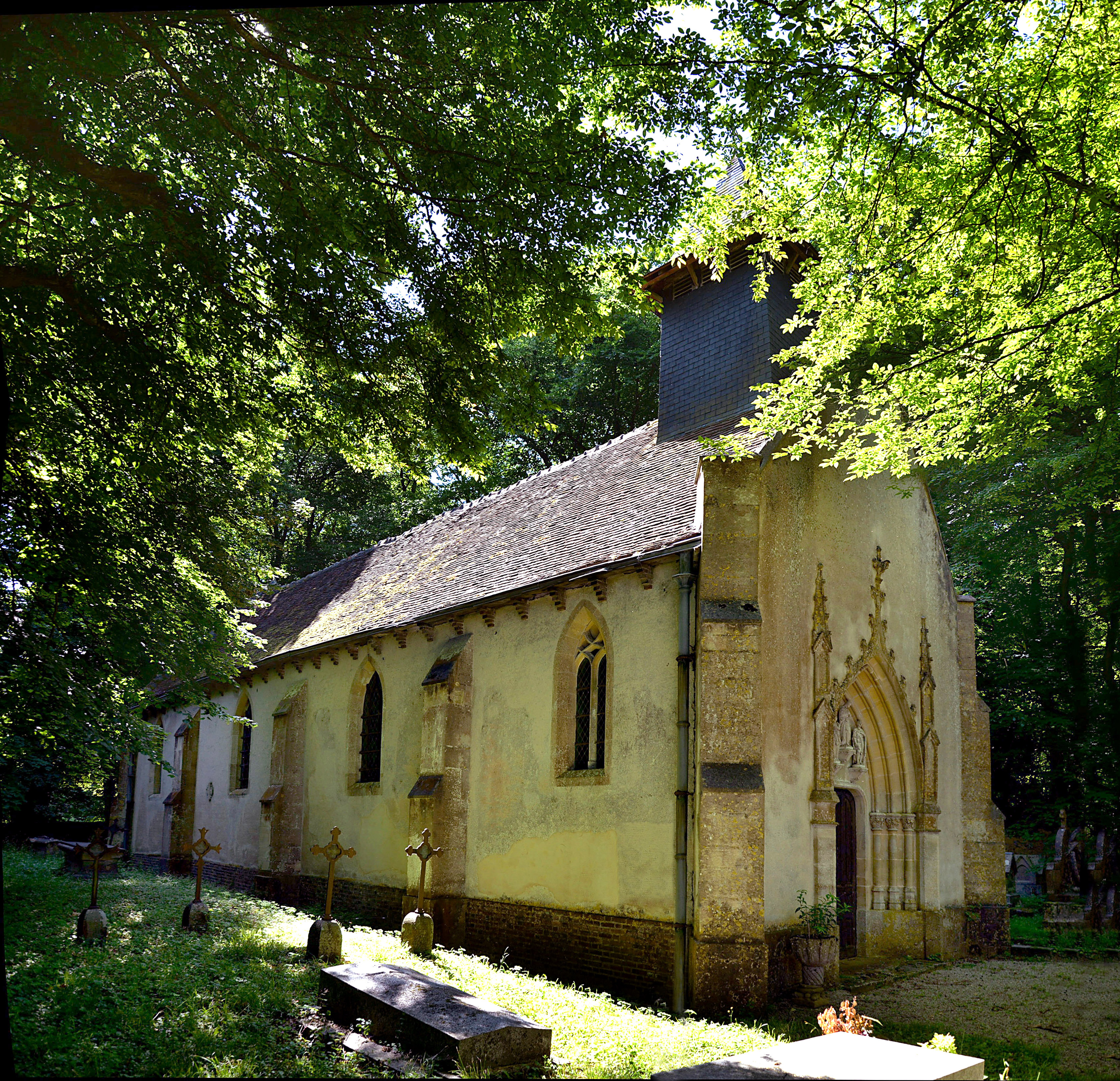
Chapelle de Tertu à Villedieu-lès-Bailleul

== See also ==
- Communes of the Orne department
