= Louvières-en-Auge =

- Commune
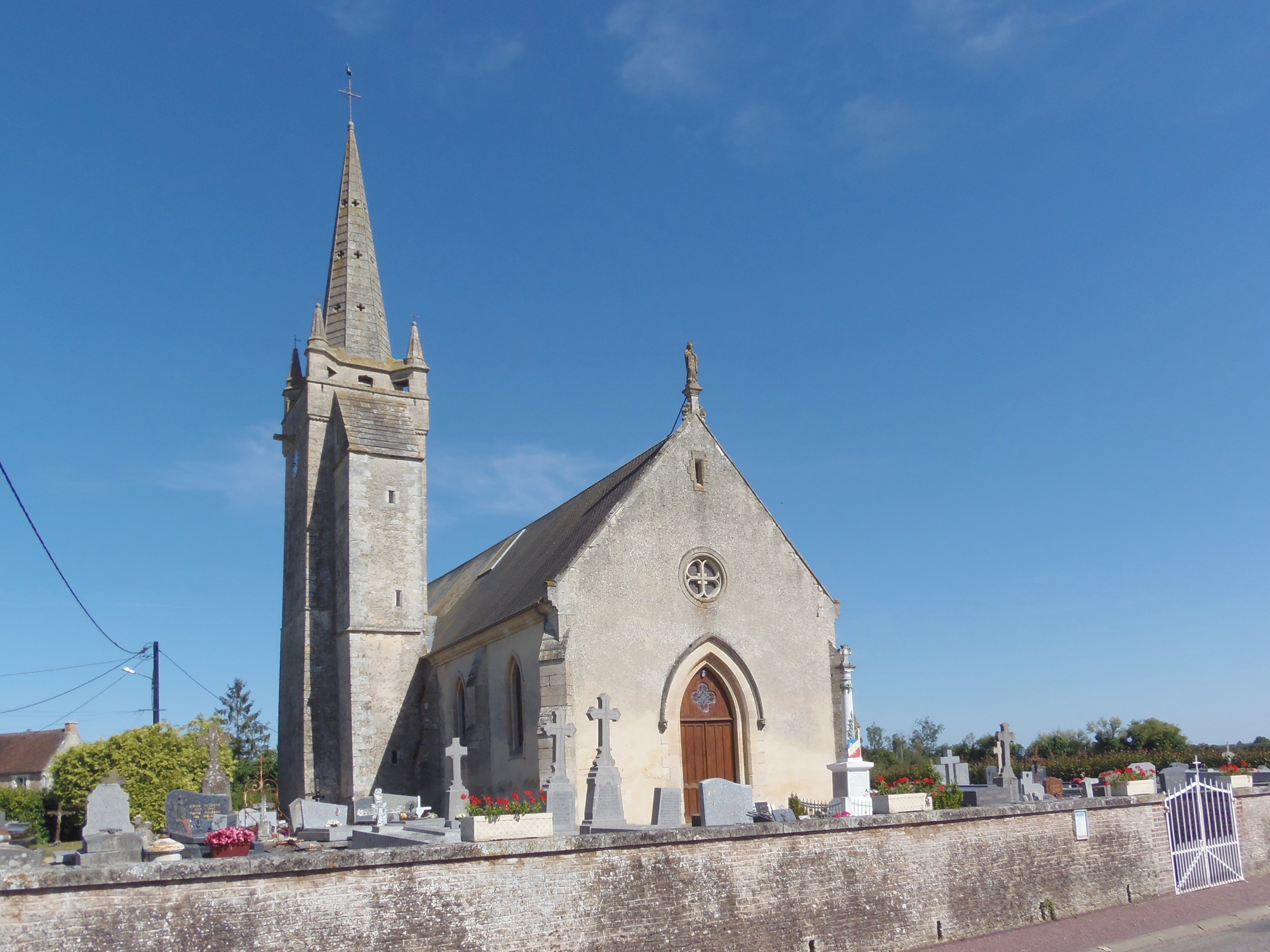
- The church in Louvières-en-Auge
- Location of Louvières-en-Auge
- Location within France Location within Normandy
- Coordinates: 48°52′15″N 0°01′54″E
- Country: France
- Region: Normandy
- Department: Orne
- Arrondissement: Argentan
- Canton: Argentan-2
- Intercommunality: Terres d'Argentan Interco

Government
  - Mayor (2020–2026): Louis Lecherbonnier
- Area^{1}: 6.22 km^{2} (2.40 sq mi)
- Elevation: 105 m (344 ft)
- Highest elevation: 152 m (499 ft)
- Lowest elevation: 84 m (276 ft)
- Population (2023): 90
  - Density: 14/km^{2} (37/sq mi)
- Time zone: UTC+01:00 (CET)
  - Summer (DST): UTC+02:00 (CEST)
- INSEE/Postal code: 61238 /61160
- ^{1} French Land Register data, which excludes lakes, ponds, glaciers > 1 km^{2} (0.386 sq mi or 247 acres) and river estuaries.

Louvières-en-Auge (French pronunciation: [luvjɛʁ ɑ̃.n‿oʒ], literally Louvières in Auge) is a commune in the Orne department in north-western France.

The closest airport to Louvieres-en-Auge is Deauville Airport (56 km).

== Geography ==
Louvières-en-Auge is made up of the following collection of villages and hamlets, Le Fontenil and Louvières-en-Auge.

A stream, Ruisseau du Guerard, flows through the commune.

== See also ==
- Communes of the Orne department
