= Saint-Georges-d'Annebecq =

- Commune
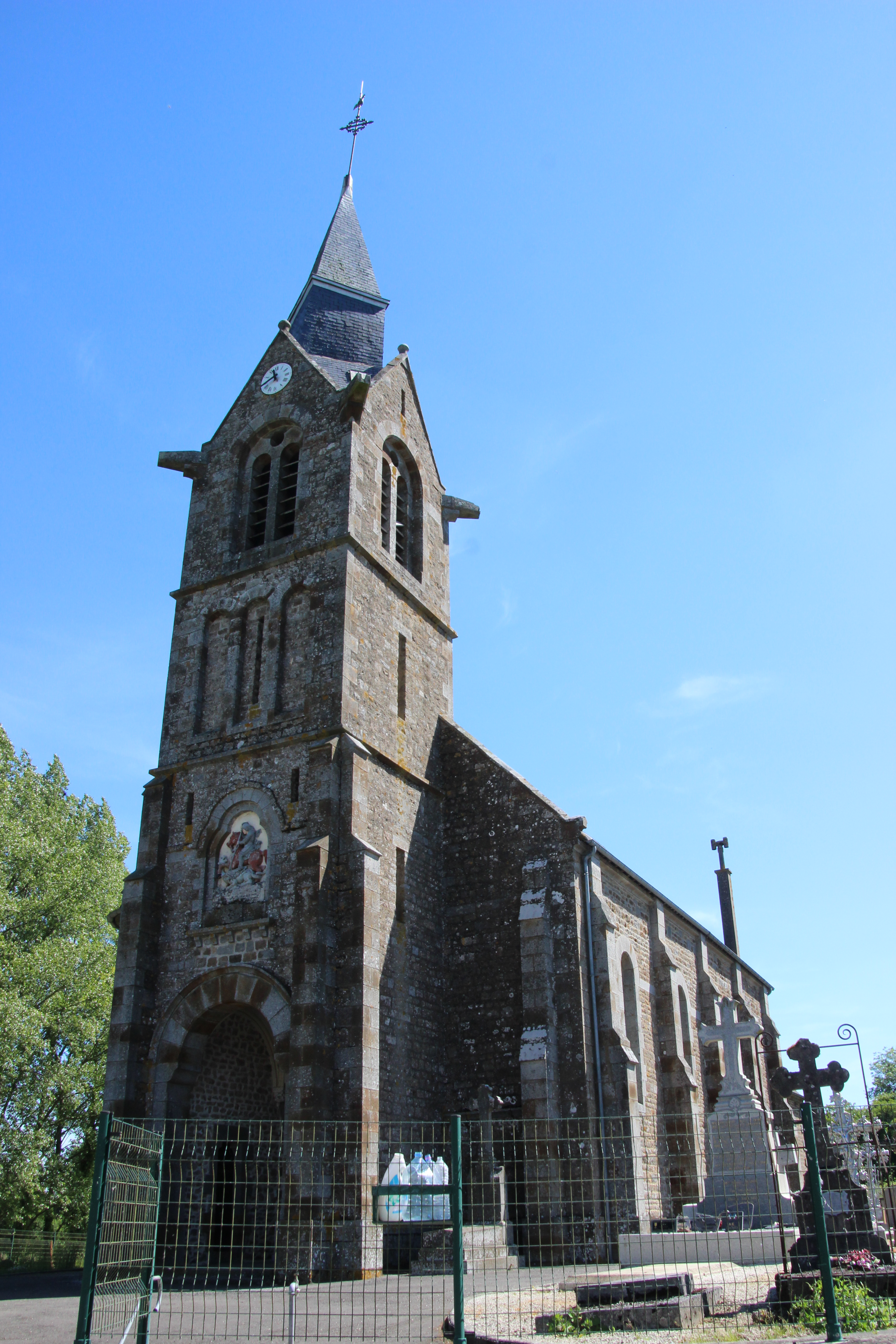
- The church in Saint-Georges-d'Annebecq
- Location of Saint-Georges-d'Annebecq
- Location within France Location within Normandy
- Coordinates: 48°38′02″N 0°15′50″W
- Country: France
- Region: Normandy
- Department: Orne
- Arrondissement: Argentan
- Canton: Magny-le-Désert
- Intercommunality: Terres d'Argentan Interco

Government
  - Mayor (2020–2026): Aurélien Baudoux
- Area^{1}: 9.35 km^{2} (3.61 sq mi)
- Elevation: 232 m (761 ft)
- Highest elevation: 292 m (958 ft)
- Lowest elevation: 213 m (699 ft)
- Population (2023): 163
  - Density: 17.4/km^{2} (45.2/sq mi)
- Time zone: UTC+01:00 (CET)
  - Summer (DST): UTC+02:00 (CEST)
- INSEE/Postal code: 61390 /61600
- ^{1} French Land Register data, which excludes lakes, ponds, glaciers > 1 km^{2} (0.386 sq mi or 247 acres) and river estuaries.

Saint-Georges-d'Annebecq (French pronunciation: [sɛ̃ ʒɔʁʒ danbɛk]) is a commune in the Orne department in Normandy (north-western France).

== Geography ==
The commune is made up of the following collection of villages and hamlets, Annebecq,La Métairie, La Chauvinière, Le Clos Léger, Le Bissonnu, Le Bois Tesselin and Saint-Georges-d'Annebecq.

It is 940 hectares (3.6 sq mi) in size. The highest point in the commune is 225 metres (738 ft).

There are a total of four watercourses that flow through the communes borders, The Rouvre river plus three streams The Beaudouit, The Bois Tesselin and the Masses.

== See also ==
- Communes of the Orne department
