= Terres d'Argentan Interco =

Federation of municipalities in Lower Normandy, France

- Communauté de communes
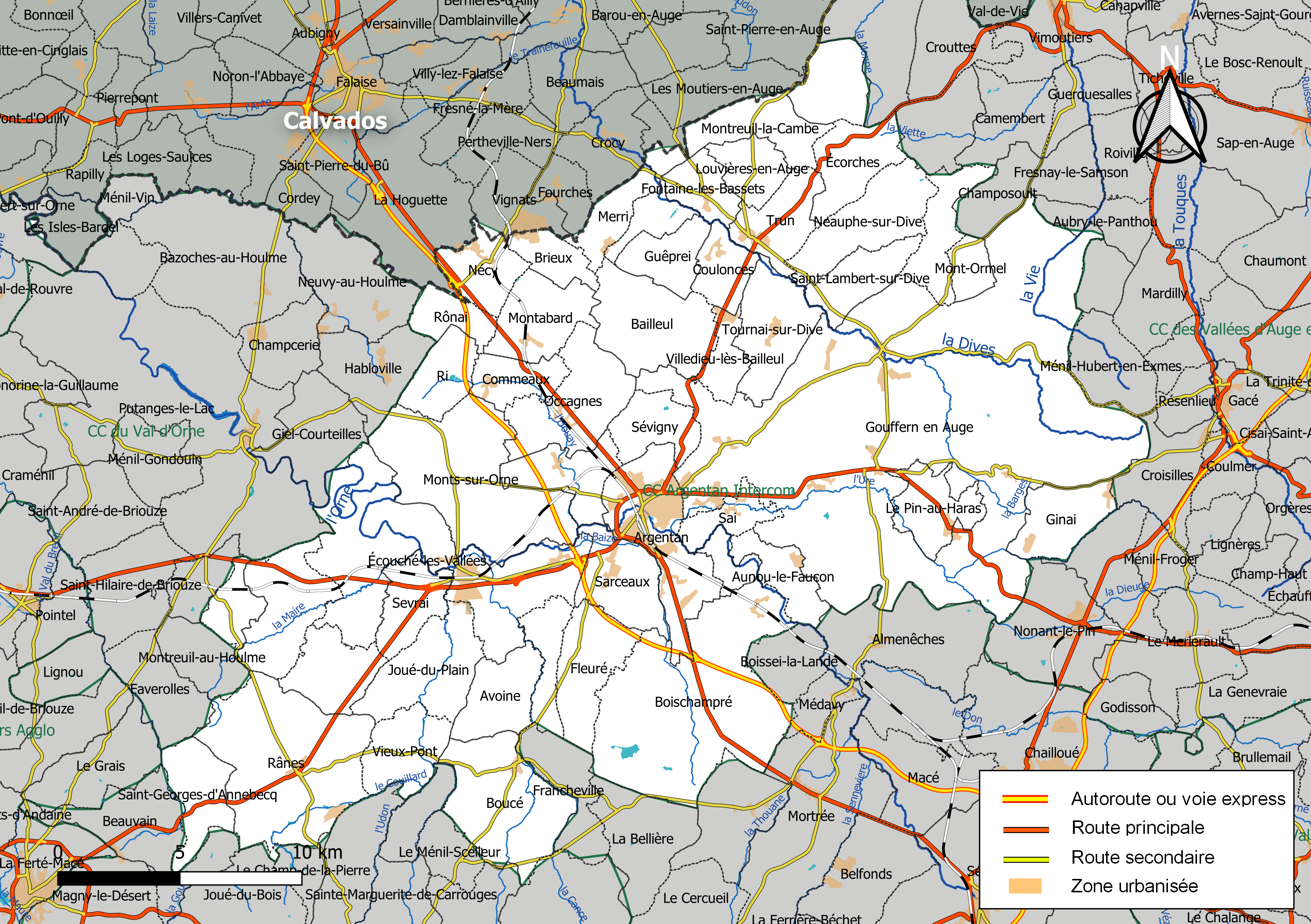
- Map of communes in Terres d'Argentan Interco
- Country: France
- Region: Normandy
- Department: Orne
- No. of communes: 49
- Established: January 2017

Government
  - President: Frédéric Leveillé
- Area: 715.1 km^{2} (276.1 sq mi)
- Population (2019): 33,409
  - Density: 46.72/km^{2} (121.0/sq mi)
- Website: terresdargentan.fr

Terres d'Argentan Interco (before 2023: Communauté de communes d'Argentan Intercom) is a federation of municipalities (communauté de communes) in the Orne département and in the Normandy région of France. Its seat is Argentan. Its area is 715.1 km^{2}, and its population in 2019 was 33,409. It covers some of the Communes that make up the area known as Suisse Normande.

== Composition ==
The communauté de communes consists of the following 49 communes:

1. Argentan
2. Aunou-le-Faucon
3. Avoine
4. Bailleul
5. Boischampré
6. Boucé
7. Brieux
8. Commeaux
9. Coudehard
10. Coulonces
11. Écorches
12. Écouché-les-Vallées
13. Fleuré
14. Fontaine-les-Bassets
15. Ginai
16. Gouffern en Auge
17. Guêprei
18. Joué-du-Plain
19. Juvigny-sur-Orne
20. La Lande-de-Lougé
21. Le Pin-au-Haras
22. Lougé-sur-Maire
23. Louvières-en-Auge
24. Merri
25. Mont-Ormel
26. Montabard
27. Montreuil-la-Cambe
28. Monts-sur-Orne
29. Moulins-sur-Orne
30. Neauphe-sur-Dive
31. Nécy
32. Occagnes
33. Ommoy
34. Rânes
35. Ri
36. Rônai
37. Sai
38. Saint-Brice-sous-Rânes
39. Saint-Georges-d'Annebecq
40. Saint-Gervais-des-Sablons
41. Saint-Lambert-sur-Dive
42. Sarceaux
43. Sévigny
44. Sevrai
45. Tanques
46. Tournai-sur-Dive
47. Trun
48. Vieux-Pont
49. Villedieu-lès-Bailleul
