= Arrondissement of Argentan =

Coordinates: 48°44′12″N 0°01′17″W

Argentan
- Arrondissement
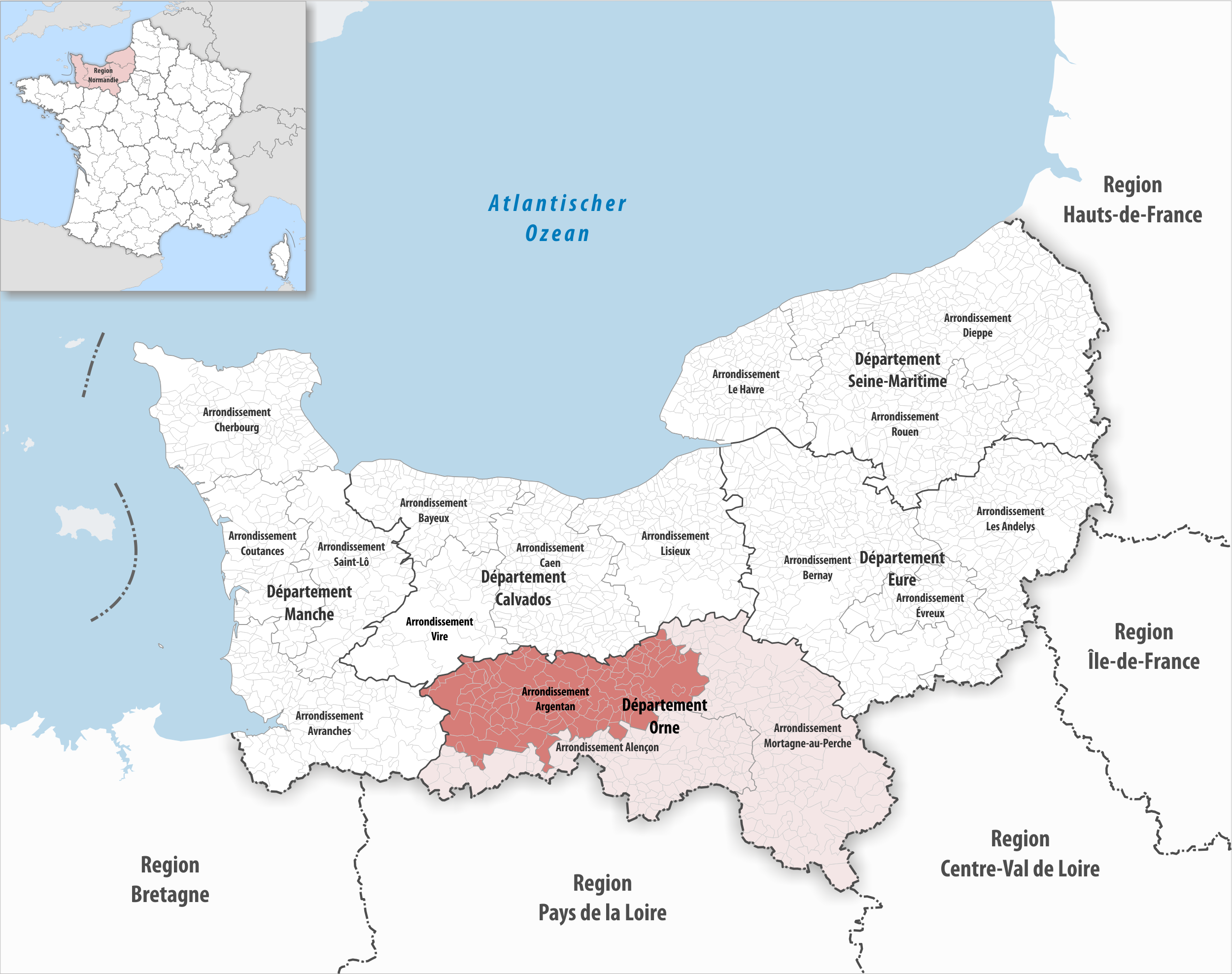
- Location within the region Normandy
- Country: France
- Region: Normandy
- Department: Orne
- No. of communes: {{{nbcomm}}}
- Area: 1,904.1 km^{2} (735.2 sq mi)
- Population (2023): 107,097
  - Density: 56.245/km^{2} (145.68/sq mi)
- INSEE code: 612

The arrondissement of Argentan (French: arrondissement d'Argentan) is an arrondissement of France, located in the Orne department, region of Normandy. It has 123 communes. Its population is 107,625 (2021), and its area is 1,904.1 km^{2} (735.2 sq mi).

== Composition ==
The communes of the arrondissement of Argentan are:

1. Argentan
2. Athis-Val de Rouvre
3. Aubusson
4. Aunou-le-Faucon
5. Avoine
6. Avrilly
7. Bailleul
8. Banvou
9. Bazoches-au-Houlme
10. La Bazoque
11. Bellou-en-Houlme
12. Berjou
13. Boischampré
14. Boucé
15. Brieux
16. Briouze
17. Cahan
18. Caligny
19. Cerisy-Belle-Étoile
20. Champcerie
21. Champsecret
22. Chanu
23. La Chapelle-au-Moine
24. La Chapelle-Biche
25. Le Châtellier
26. Commeaux
27. Coudehard
28. Coulonces
29. La Coulonche
30. Craménil
31. Domfront en Poiraie
32. Dompierre
33. Durcet
34. Échalou
35. Écorches
36. Écouché-les-Vallées
37. Faverolles
38. La Ferrière-aux-Étangs
39. La Ferté-Macé
40. Flers
41. Fleuré
42. Fontaine-les-Bassets
43. Giel-Courteilles
44. Ginai
45. Gouffern en Auge
46. Le Grais
47. Guêprei
48. Habloville
49. Joué-du-Plain
50. Juvigny-sur-Orne
51. La Lande-de-Lougé
52. La Lande-Patry
53. La Lande-Saint-Siméon
54. Landigou
55. Landisacq
56. Lignou
57. Lonlay-l'Abbaye
58. Lonlay-le-Tesson
59. Lougé-sur-Maire
60. Louvières-en-Auge
61. Le Ménil-Ciboult
62. Le Ménil-de-Briouze
63. Ménil-Gondouin
64. Ménil-Hermei
65. Ménil-Hubert-sur-Orne
66. Ménil-Vin
67. Merri
68. Messei
69. Moncy
70. Montabard
71. Montilly-sur-Noireau
72. Mont-Ormel
73. Montreuil-au-Houlme
74. Montreuil-la-Cambe
75. Les Monts d'Andaine
76. Montsecret-Clairefougère
77. Monts-sur-Orne
78. Moulins-sur-Orne
79. Neauphe-sur-Dive
80. Nécy
81. Neuvy-au-Houlme
82. Occagnes
83. Ommoy
84. Le Pin-au-Haras
85. Pointel
86. Putanges-le-Lac
87. Rânes
88. Ri
89. Rônai
90. Sai
91. Saint-André-de-Briouze
92. Saint-André-de-Messei
93. Saint-Bômer-les-Forges
94. Saint-Brice
95. Saint-Brice-sous-Rânes
96. Saint-Christophe-de-Chaulieu
97. Saint-Clair-de-Halouze
98. Sainte-Honorine-la-Chardonne
99. Sainte-Honorine-la-Guillaume
100. Sainte-Opportune
101. Saint-Georges-d'Annebecq
102. Saint-Georges-des-Groseillers
103. Saint-Gervais-des-Sablons
104. Saint-Gilles-des-Marais
105. Saint-Hilaire-de-Briouze
106. Saint-Lambert-sur-Dive
107. Saint-Paul
108. Saint-Philbert-sur-Orne
109. Saint-Pierre-d'Entremont
110. Saint-Pierre-du-Regard
111. Saint-Quentin-les-Chardonnets
112. Saires-la-Verrerie
113. Sarceaux
114. La Selle-la-Forge
115. Sévigny
116. Sevrai
117. Tanques
118. Tinchebray-Bocage
119. Tournai-sur-Dive
120. Trun
121. Vieux-Pont
122. Villedieu-lès-Bailleul
123. Les Yveteaux

== History ==
The arrondissement of Argentan was created in 1800. At the January 2017 reorganisation of the arrondissements of Orne, it gained 11 communes from the arrondissement of Alençon, and it lost nine communes to the arrondissement of Alençon and 49 communes to the arrondissement of Mortagne-au-Perche.

As a result of the reorganisation of the cantons of France which came into effect in 2015, the borders of the cantons are no longer related to the borders of the arrondissements. The cantons of the arrondissement of Argentan were, as of January 2015:

1. Argentan-Est
2. Argentan-Ouest
3. Athis-de-l'Orne
4. Briouze
5. Écouché
6. Exmes
7. La Ferté-Frênel
8. Flers-Nord
9. Flers-Sud
10. Gacé
11. Le Merlerault
12. Messei
13. Mortrée
14. Putanges-Pont-Écrepin
15. Tinchebray
16. Trun
17. Vimoutiers
