= Guêprei =

- Commune
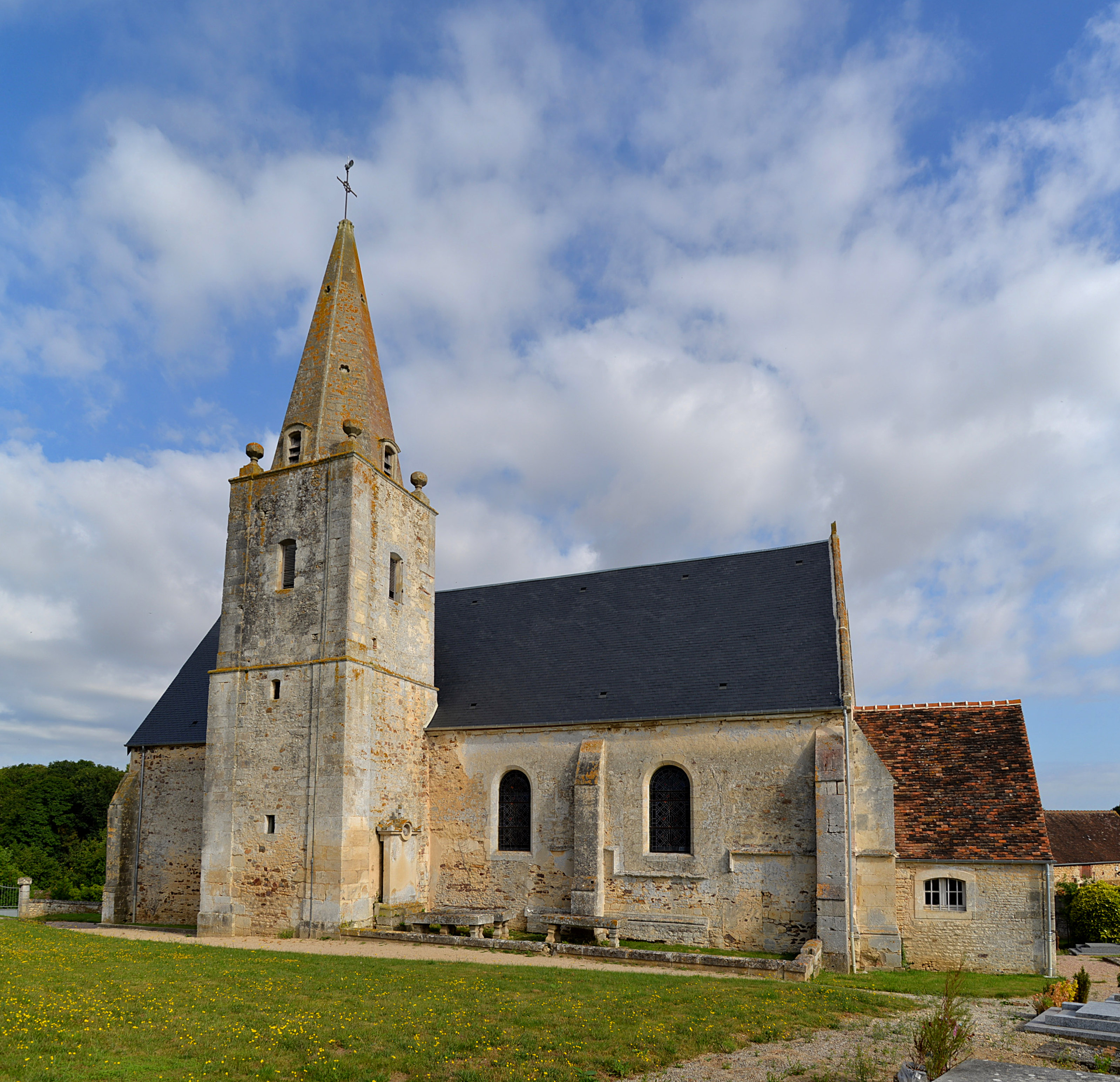
- The church in Guêprei
- Location of Guêprei
- Location within France Location within Normandy
- Coordinates: 48°50′12″N 0°00′26″W
- Country: France
- Region: Normandy
- Department: Orne
- Arrondissement: Argentan
- Canton: Argentan-2
- Intercommunality: Terres d'Argentan Interco

Government
  - Mayor (2020–2026): Patrick Lamothe
- Area^{1}: 7.10 km^{2} (2.74 sq mi)
- Elevation: 106 m (348 ft)
- Highest elevation: 169 m (554 ft)
- Lowest elevation: 73 m (240 ft)
- Population (2023): 153
  - Density: 21.5/km^{2} (55.8/sq mi)
- Time zone: UTC+01:00 (CET)
  - Summer (DST): UTC+02:00 (CEST)
- INSEE/Postal code: 61197 /61160
- ^{1} French Land Register data, which excludes lakes, ponds, glaciers > 1 km^{2} (0.386 sq mi or 247 acres) and river estuaries.

Guêprei (French pronunciation: [ɡɛpʁɛ]) is a commune in the Orne department in north-western France.

== Geography ==
The commune is made up of the following collection of villages and hamlets, La Poterie des Vignats, Roc and Guêprei.

The commune has the River Dives running through it and one stream, Merdret's Creek.

== See also ==
- Communes of the Orne department
