= Canton of Argentan-2 =

Coordinates: 48.74°N 0.01°W

The canton of Argentan-2 is an administrative division of the Orne department, northwestern France. It was created at the French canton reorganisation which came into effect in March 2015. Its seat is in Argentan.

It consists of the following communes:

1. Argentan (partly)
2. Bailleul
3. Coudehard
4. Coulonces
5. Écorches
6. Fontaine-les-Bassets
7. Ginai
8. Gouffern en Auge
9. Guêprei
10. Louvières-en-Auge
11. Merri
12. Mont-Ormel
13. Montreuil-la-Cambe
14. Neauphe-sur-Dive
15. Ommoy
16. Le Pin-au-Haras
17. Saint-Gervais-des-Sablons
18. Saint-Lambert-sur-Dive
19. Tournai-sur-Dive
20. Trun
21. Villedieu-lès-Bailleul
