= Ginai =

- Commune
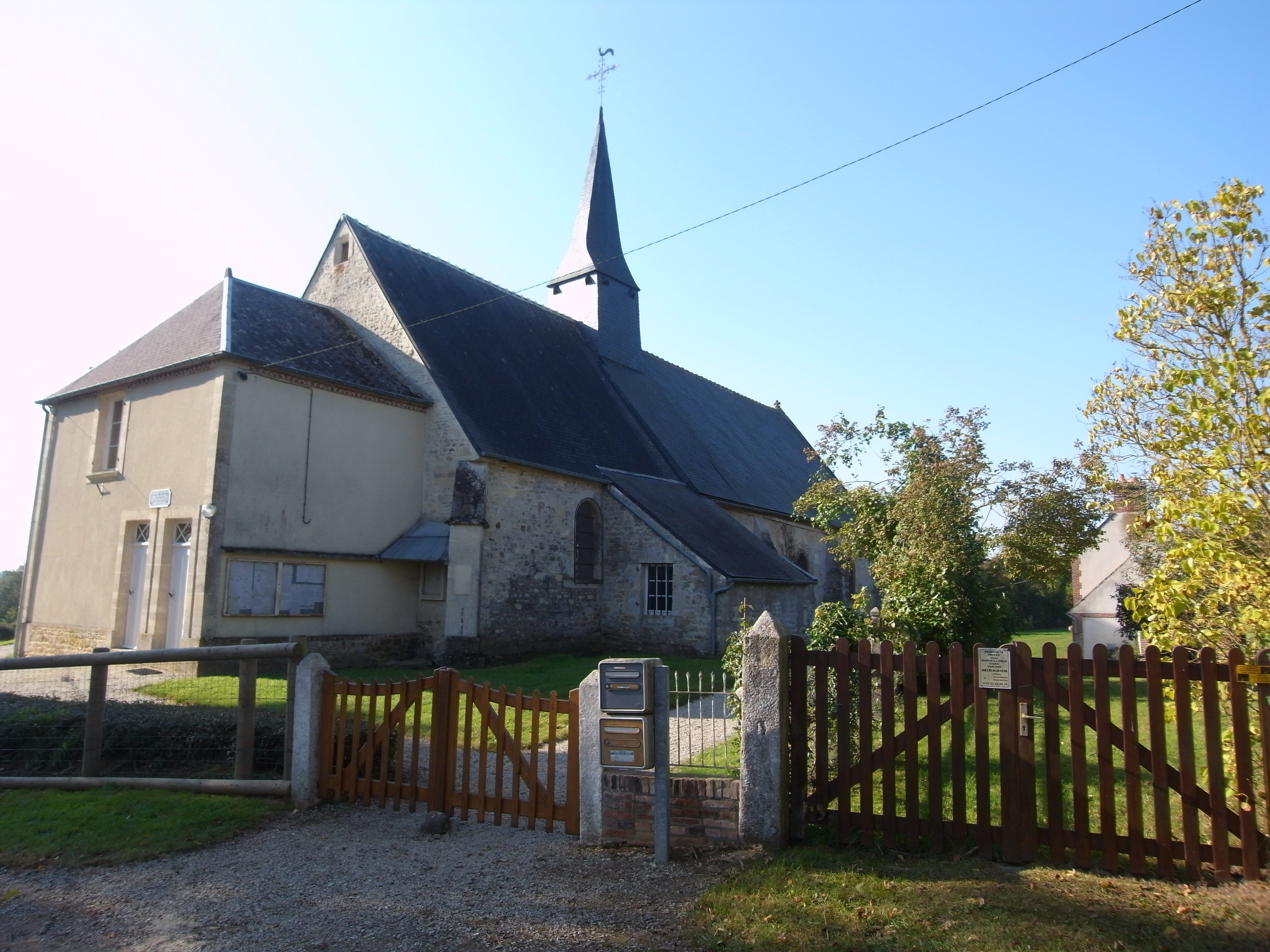
- The church in Ginai
- Location of Ginai
- Location within France Location within Normandy
- Coordinates: 48°44′52″N 0°13′06″E
- Country: France
- Region: Normandy
- Department: Orne
- Arrondissement: Argentan
- Canton: Argentan-2
- Intercommunality: Terres d'Argentan Interco

Government
  - Mayor (2020–2026): Michel Buon
- Area^{1}: 9.25 km^{2} (3.57 sq mi)
- Elevation: 320 m (1,050 ft)
- Highest elevation: 268 m (879 ft)
- Lowest elevation: 182 m (597 ft)
- Population (2023): 74
  - Density: 8.0/km^{2} (21/sq mi)
- Time zone: UTC+01:00 (CET)
  - Summer (DST): UTC+02:00 (CEST)
- INSEE/Postal code: 61190 /61310
- ^{1} French Land Register data, which excludes lakes, ponds, glaciers > 1 km^{2} (0.386 sq mi or 247 acres) and river estuaries.

Ginai (French pronunciation: [ʒinɛ]) is a commune in the Orne department in north-western France.

== Geography ==
The commune is made up of the following collection of villages and hamlets, La Briquetière, Les Bruyères and Ginai.

The Commune is one of 27 communes that make up the Natura 2000 protected area of Bocages et vergers du sud Pays d'Auge.

The river Ure runs through the commune in addition to a single stream, the Roule-Crottes.

== Notable buildings and places ==
=== National heritage sites ===
- Hippodrome de Bergerie a racecourse that is owned by the Haras du Pin. It hosted Normandy's first gallop race in 1851. In 1863 it was inaugurated in 1863 by Napoleon III. It was classed as a Monument historique.

== See also ==
- Communes of the Orne department
