= Coulonces, Orne =

Coulonces
- Commune
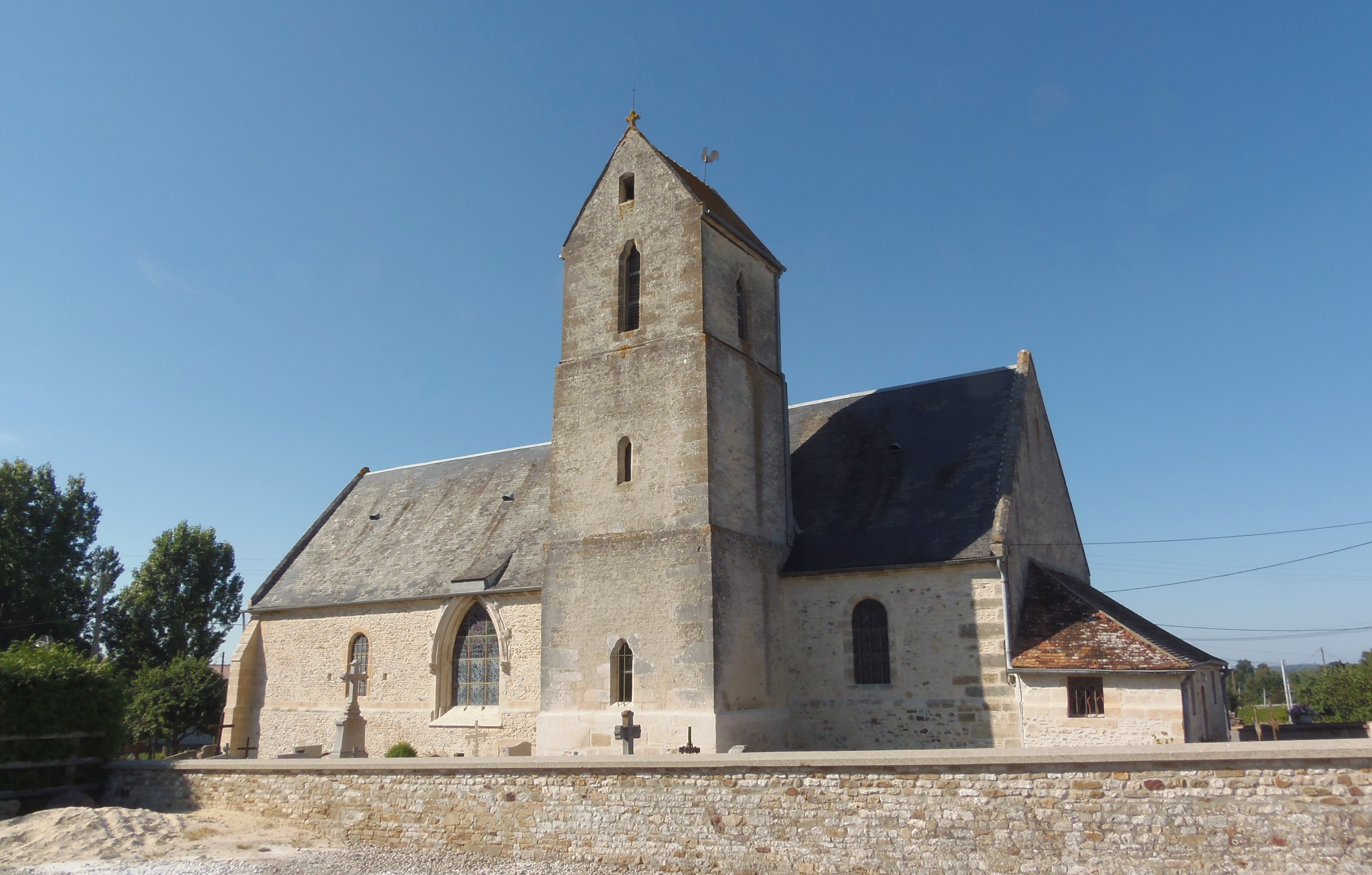
- The church in Coulonces
- Location of Coulonces
- Location within France Location within Normandy
- Coordinates: 48°50′13″N 0°00′30″E
- Country: France
- Region: Normandy
- Department: Orne
- Arrondissement: Argentan
- Canton: Argentan-2
- Intercommunality: Terres d'Argentan Interco

Government
  - Mayor (2020–2026): Daniel Marrière
- Area^{1}: 6.15 km^{2} (2.37 sq mi)
- Elevation: 65 m (213 ft)
- Highest elevation: 141 m (463 ft)
- Lowest elevation: 75 m (246 ft)
- Population (2023): 209
  - Density: 34.0/km^{2} (88.0/sq mi)
- Time zone: UTC+01:00 (CET)
  - Summer (DST): UTC+02:00 (CEST)
- INSEE/Postal code: 61123 /61160
- ^{1} French Land Register data, which excludes lakes, ponds, glaciers > 1 km^{2} (0.386 sq mi or 247 acres) and river estuaries.

Coulonces is a commune in the Orne department in north-western France.

== Geography ==
The commune is made up of the following collection of villages and hamlets, La Villette and Coulonces.

The commune has the River Dives running through it plus two streams the Ruisseau Merdret de and Ruisseau du Guerard.

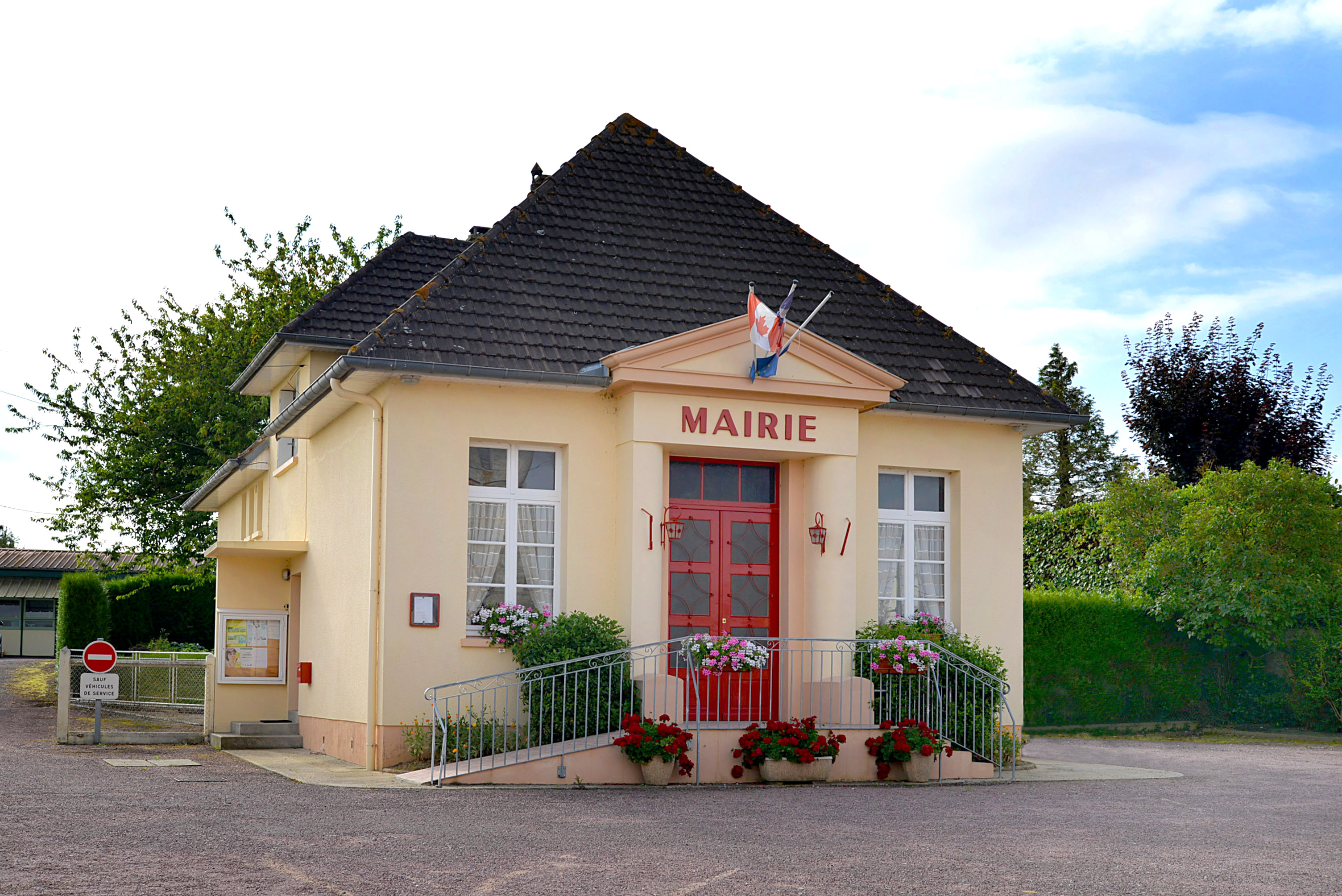
Mairie de Coulonces

== See also ==
- Communes of the Orne department
