= Saint-Gervais-des-Sablons =

- Commune
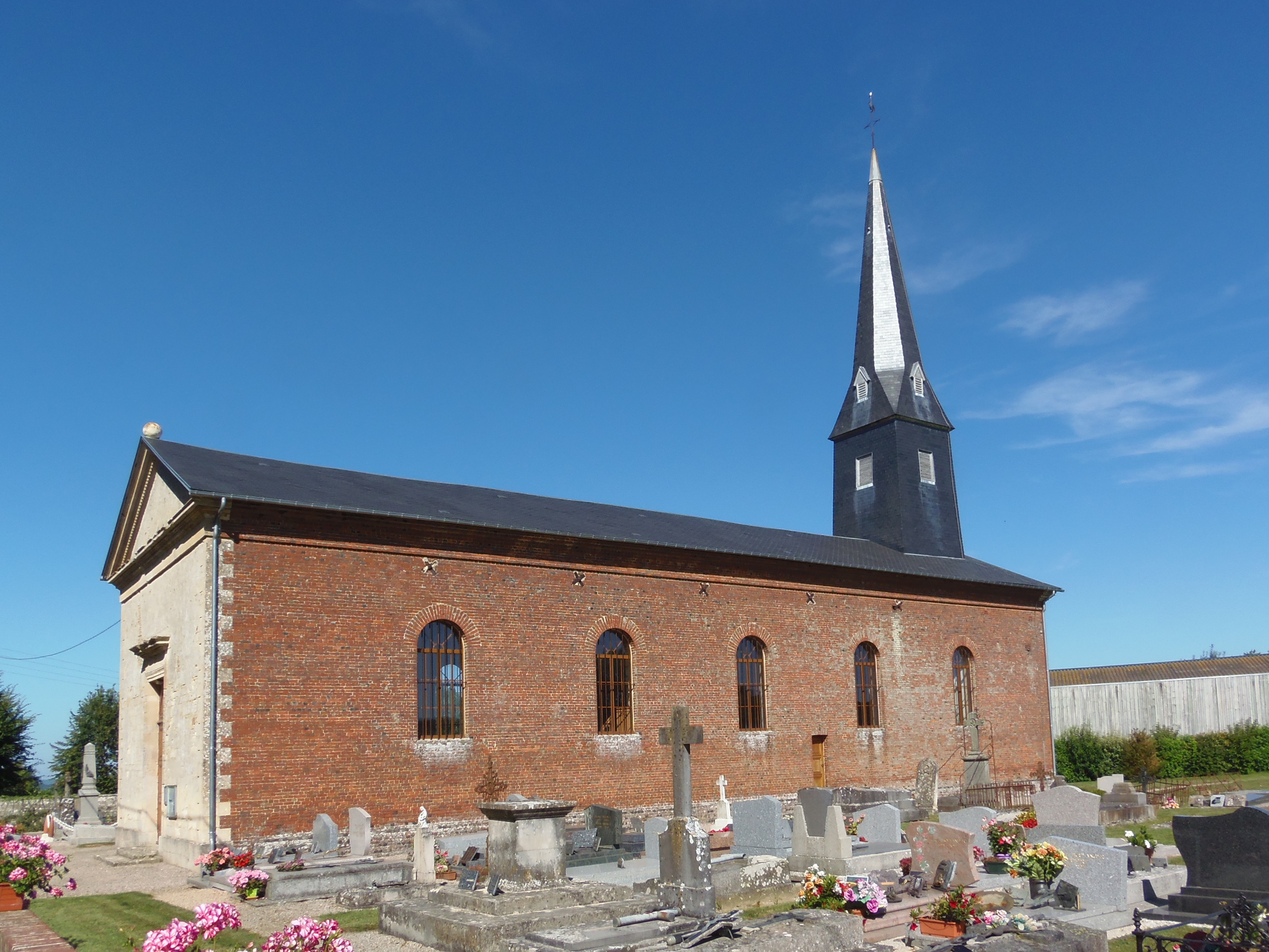
- The church in Saint-Gervais-des-Sablons
- Location of Saint-Gervais-des-Sablons
- Location within France Location within Normandy
- Coordinates: 48°54′13″N 0°04′39″E
- Country: France
- Region: Normandy
- Department: Orne
- Arrondissement: Argentan
- Canton: Argentan-2
- Intercommunality: Terres d'Argentan Interco

Government
  - Mayor (2020–2026): Alain Picco
- Area^{1}: 8.8 km^{2} (3.4 sq mi)
- Elevation: 224 m (735 ft)
- Highest elevation: 265 m (869 ft)
- Lowest elevation: 129 m (423 ft)
- Population (2023): 70
  - Density: 8.0/km^{2} (21/sq mi)
- Time zone: UTC+01:00 (CET)
  - Summer (DST): UTC+02:00 (CEST)
- INSEE/Postal code: 61399 /61160
- ^{1} French Land Register data, which excludes lakes, ponds, glaciers > 1 km^{2} (0.386 sq mi or 247 acres) and river estuaries.

Saint-Gervais-des-Sablons (French pronunciation: [sɛ̃ ʒɛʁvɛ de sablɔ̃]) is a commune in the Orne department in north-western France.

== Geography ==
The commune along with another 11 communes shares part of a 1,400 hectare, Natura 2000 conservation area, called the Haute Vallée de la Touques et affluents.

The river La Monne flows through the commune. in addition two streams also pass through the commune, Ruisseau de Tanqueray and La Monne.

== Points of Interest ==
- Coteau des Buttes et de la Petite Garenne is a 10 hectare site classed as a Sensitive Natural Space of orne. The site is host to many rare butterflies.

== See also ==
- Communes of the Orne department
