= Neauphe-sur-Dive =

- Commune
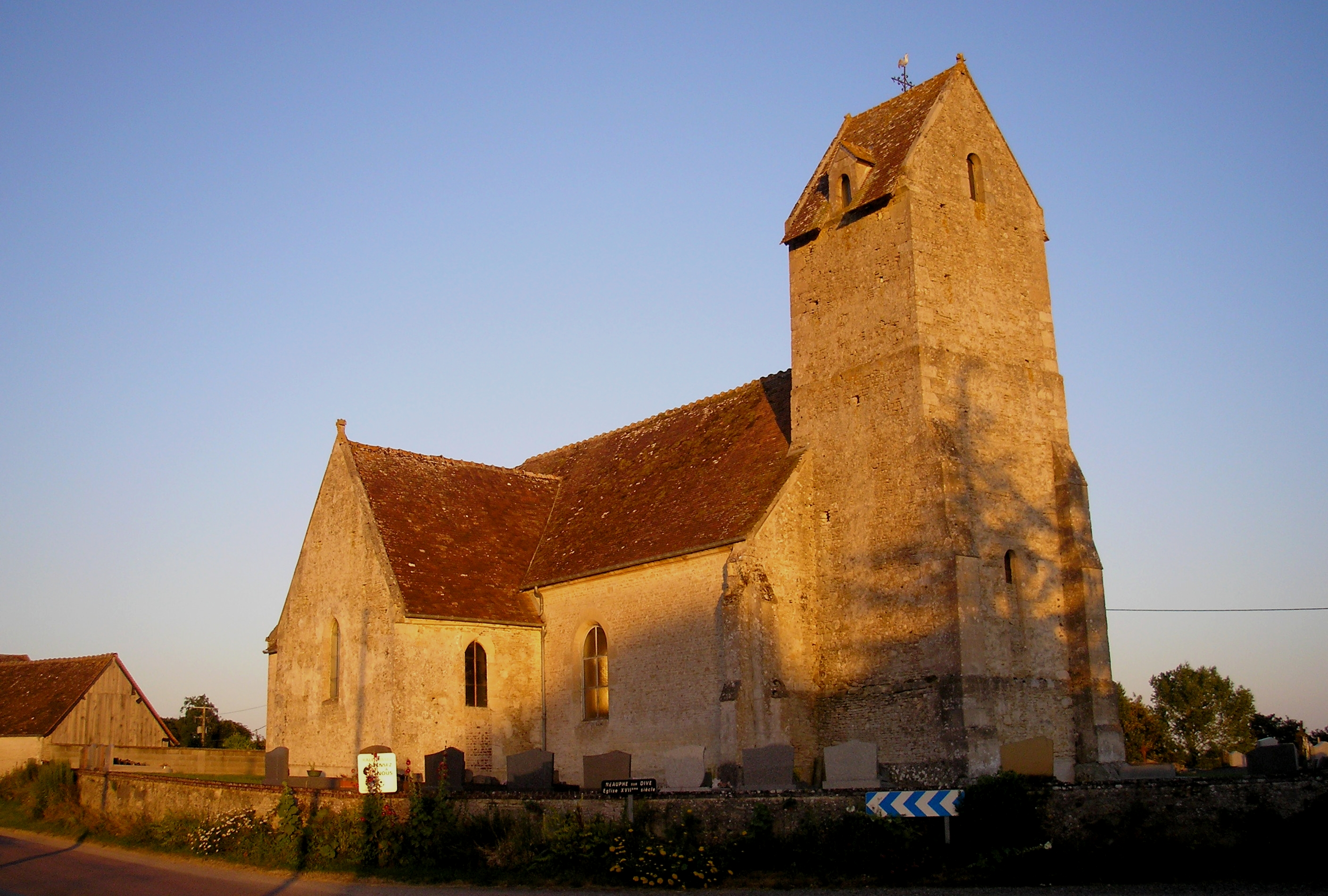
- The church in Neauphe-sur-Dive
- Location of Neauphe-sur-Dive
- Location within France Location within Normandy
- Coordinates: 48°50′58″N 0°05′48″E
- Country: France
- Region: Normandy
- Department: Orne
- Arrondissement: Argentan
- Canton: Argentan-2
- Intercommunality: Terres d'Argentan Interco

Government
  - Mayor (2020–2026): Catherine Appert
- Area^{1}: 13.89 km^{2} (5.36 sq mi)
- Elevation: 120 m (390 ft)
- Highest elevation: 241 m (791 ft)
- Lowest elevation: 83 m (272 ft)
- Population (2023): 131
  - Density: 9.43/km^{2} (24.4/sq mi)
- Time zone: UTC+01:00 (CET)
  - Summer (DST): UTC+02:00 (CEST)
- INSEE/Postal code: 61302 /61160
- ^{1} French Land Register data, which excludes lakes, ponds, glaciers > 1 km^{2} (0.386 sq mi or 247 acres) and river estuaries.

Neauphe-sur-Dive (French pronunciation: [nof syʁ div], literally Neauphe on Dive) is a commune in the Orne department in north-western France.

== Geography ==
The commune is made up of the following collection of villages and hamlets, Le Bas de Neauphe, La Filerie and Neauphe-sur-Dive.

The commune has the River Dives running through it. In addition it has 5 streams running through it, the Foulbec, the Merdret de, the Pont aux Anes, the Besion and the Secqueville.

== See also ==
- Communes of the Orne department
