= Ommoy =

- Commune
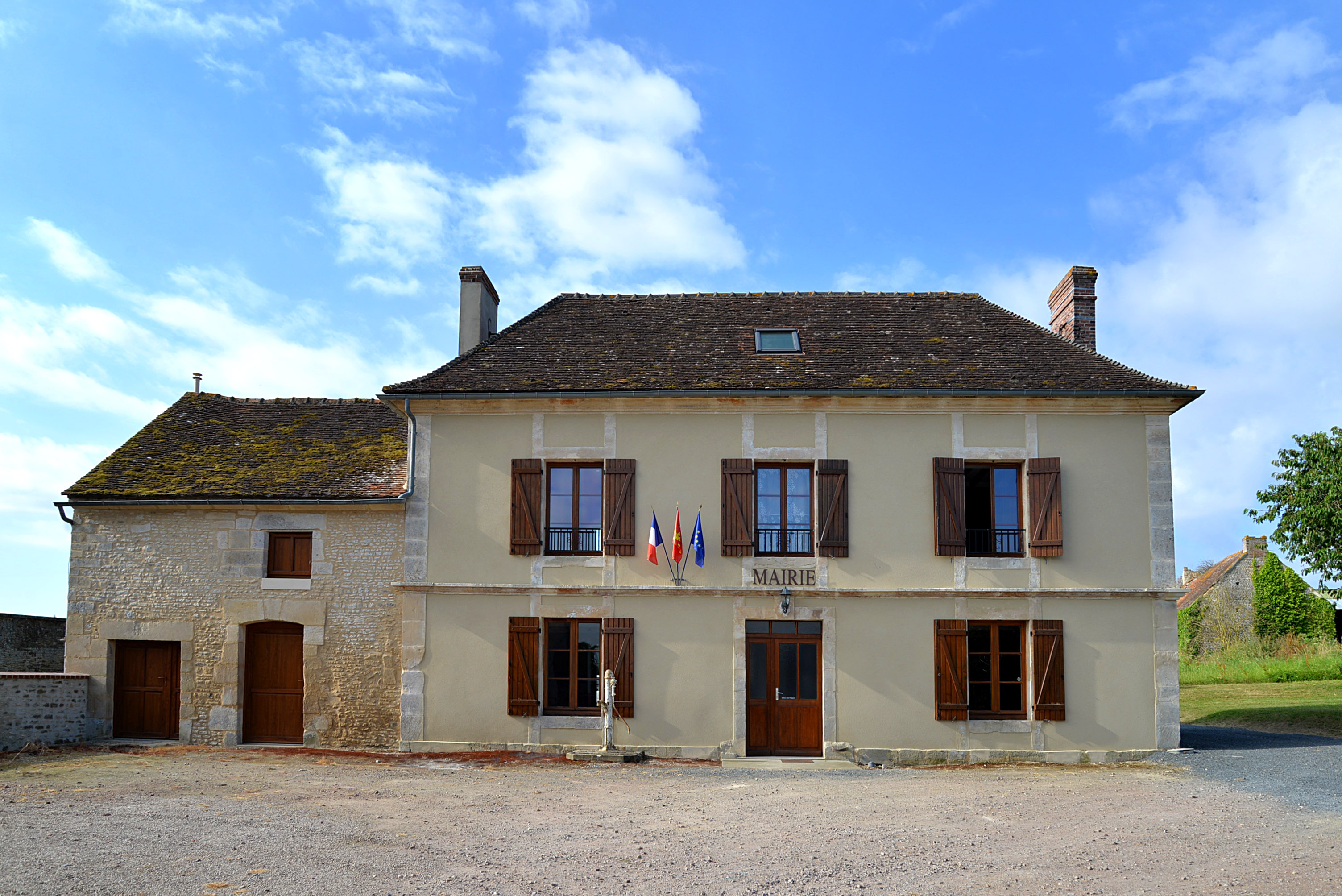
- The town hall in Ommoy
- Location of Ommoy
- Location within France Location within Normandy
- Coordinates: 48°51′22″N 0°01′19″W
- Country: France
- Region: Normandy
- Department: Orne
- Arrondissement: Argentan
- Canton: Argentan-2
- Intercommunality: Terres d'Argentan Interco

Government
  - Mayor (2020–2026): Hervé Lambert
- Area^{1}: 5.66 km^{2} (2.19 sq mi)
- Elevation: 88 m (289 ft)
- Highest elevation: 169 m (554 ft)
- Lowest elevation: 62 m (203 ft)
- Population (2023): 117
  - Density: 20.7/km^{2} (53.5/sq mi)
- Time zone: UTC+01:00 (CET)
  - Summer (DST): UTC+02:00 (CEST)
- INSEE/Postal code: 61316 /61160
- ^{1} French Land Register data, which excludes lakes, ponds, glaciers > 1 km^{2} (0.386 sq mi or 247 acres) and river estuaries.

Ommoy (French pronunciation: [ɔmwa]) is a commune in the Orne department in north-western France.

== Geography ==
The commune is made up of the following collection of villages and hamlets, Mandeville and Ommoy.

The commune has the River Dives running through it.

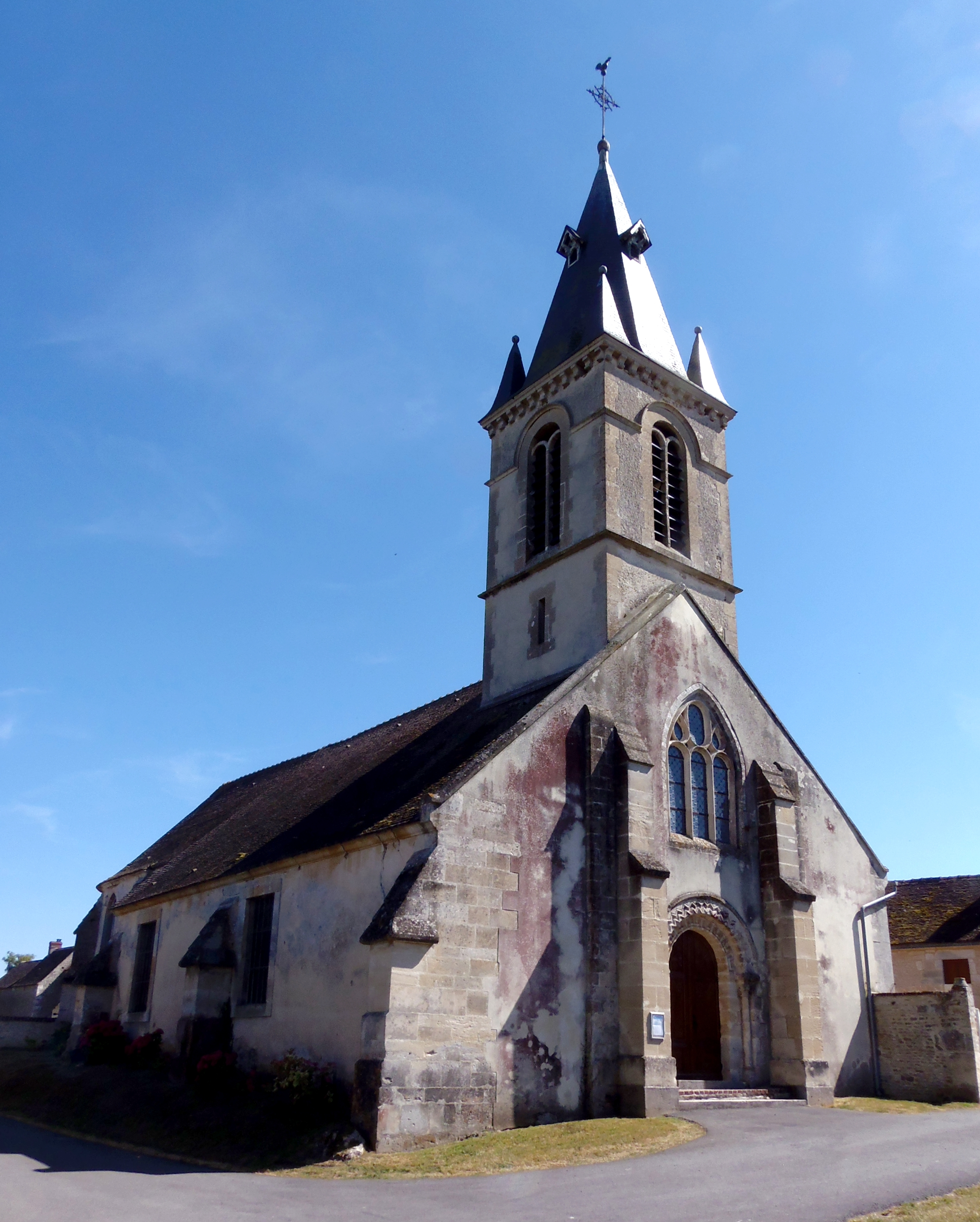
Ommoy Church

== See also ==
- Communes of the Orne department
