= Merri, Orne =

Merri
- Commune
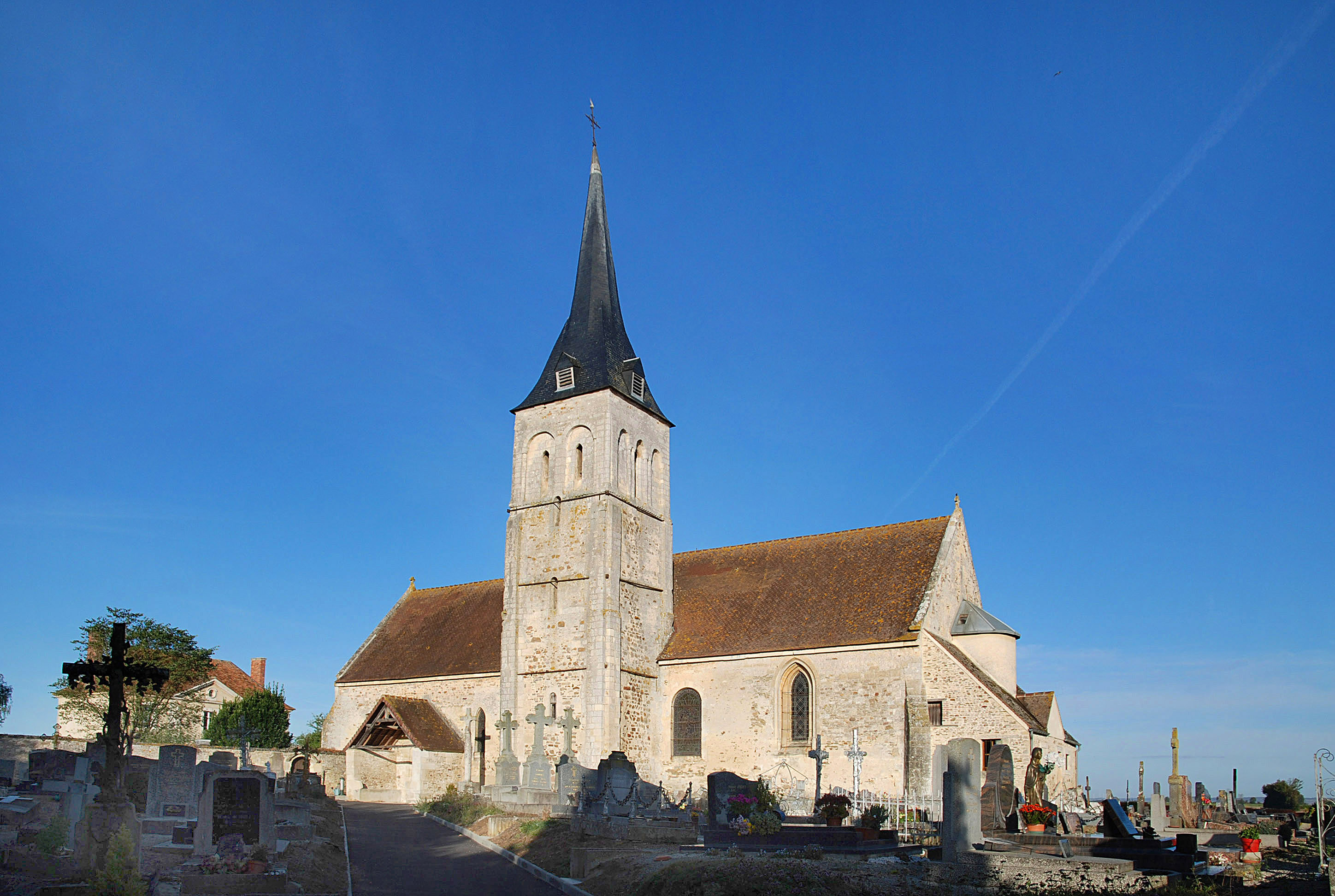
- The church in Merri
- Location of Merri
- Location within France Location within Normandy
- Coordinates: 48°51′05″N 0°02′33″W
- Country: France
- Region: Normandy
- Department: Orne
- Arrondissement: Argentan
- Canton: Argentan-2
- Intercommunality: Terres d'Argentan Interco

Government
  - Mayor (2020–2026): Nadine Boisseau
- Area^{1}: 5.81 km^{2} (2.24 sq mi)
- Elevation: 97 m (318 ft)
- Highest elevation: 171 m (561 ft)
- Lowest elevation: 62 m (203 ft)
- Population (2023): 149
  - Density: 25.6/km^{2} (66.4/sq mi)
- Time zone: UTC+01:00 (CET)
  - Summer (DST): UTC+02:00 (CEST)
- INSEE/Postal code: 61276 /61160
- ^{1} French Land Register data, which excludes lakes, ponds, glaciers > 1 km^{2} (0.386 sq mi or 247 acres) and river estuaries.

Merri (French pronunciation: [mɛʁi]) is a commune in the Orne department in north-western France.

== Geography ==
The commune is made up of the following collection of villages and hamlets, L'Herbeyand Merri.

The River Dives runs through the commune.

== Places of interest ==
- Camp de Bierre is an archaeological site dating back to the Neolithic era. The main dry-stone wall of the site measures 32 metres across and is 7 metres in height.
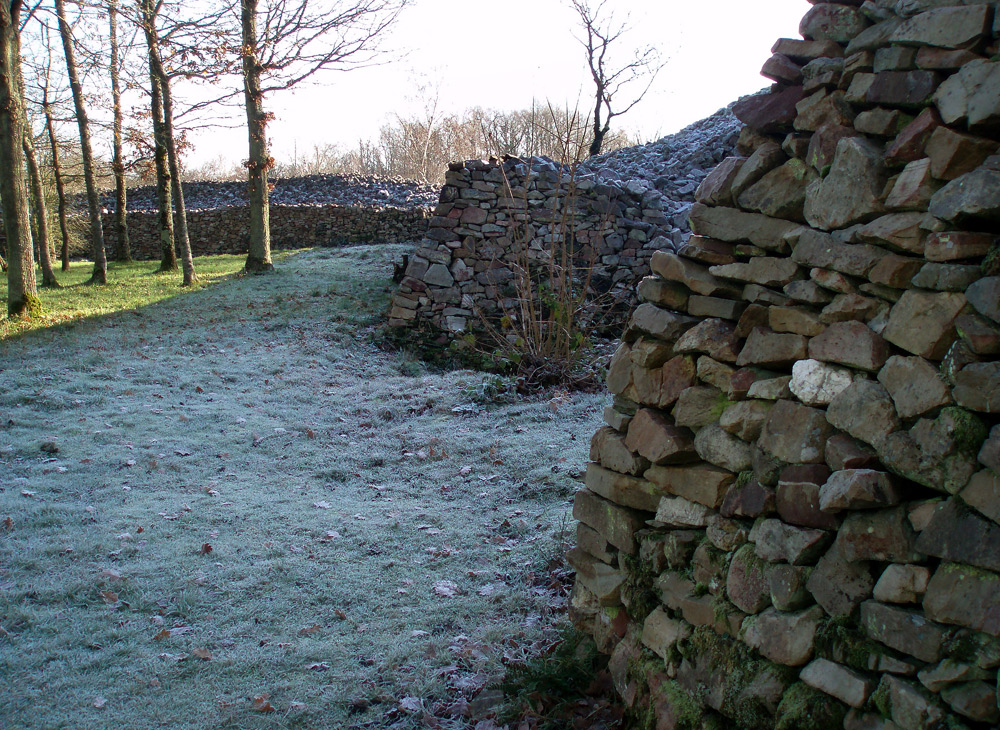
Camp de Bierre

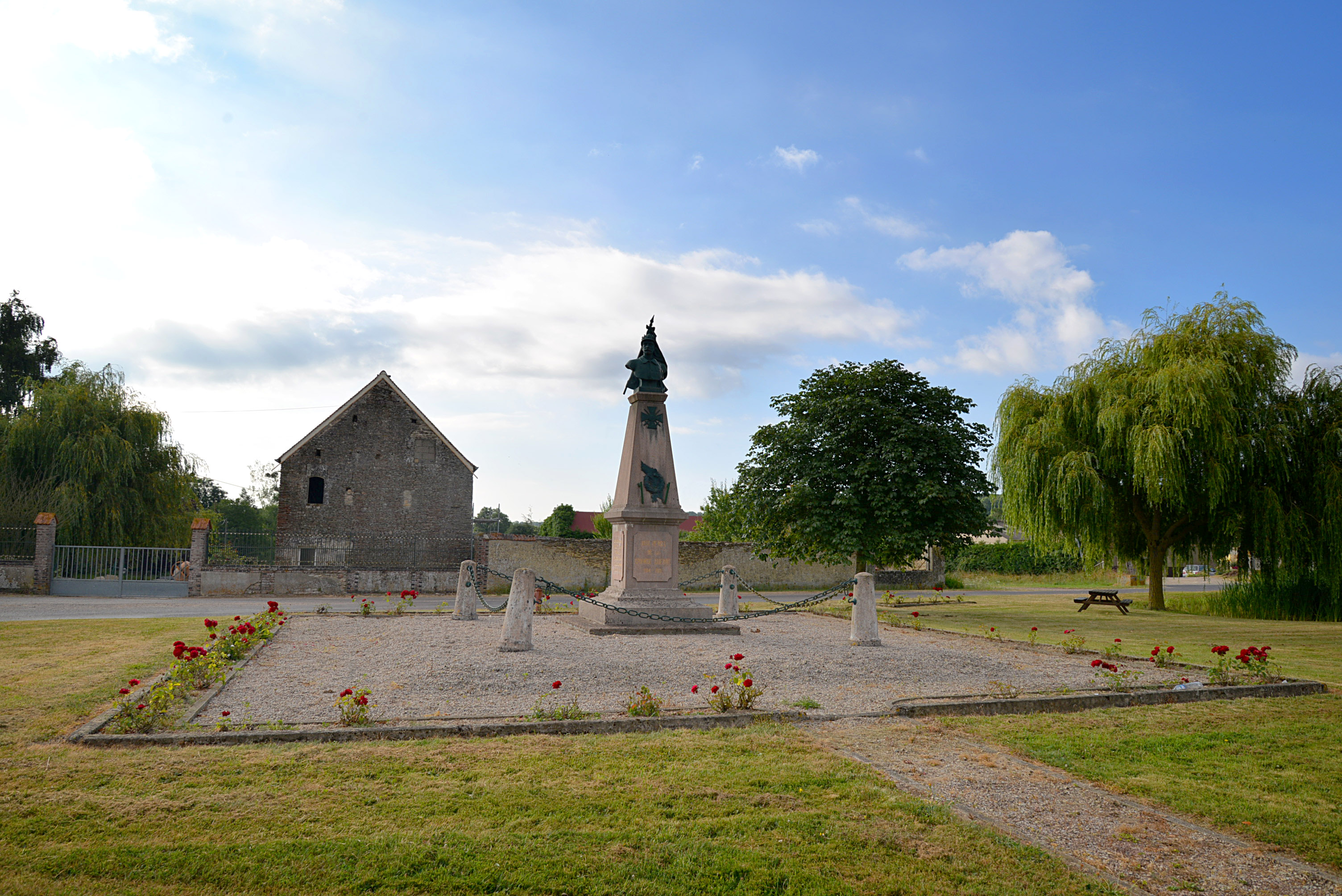
Monument aux morts in Merri

== Notable people ==
- Jacqueline Pierreux - (1923–2005) a French film and television actress, is buried here.

== See also ==
- Communes of the Orne department
