= Montreuil-la-Cambe =

- Commune
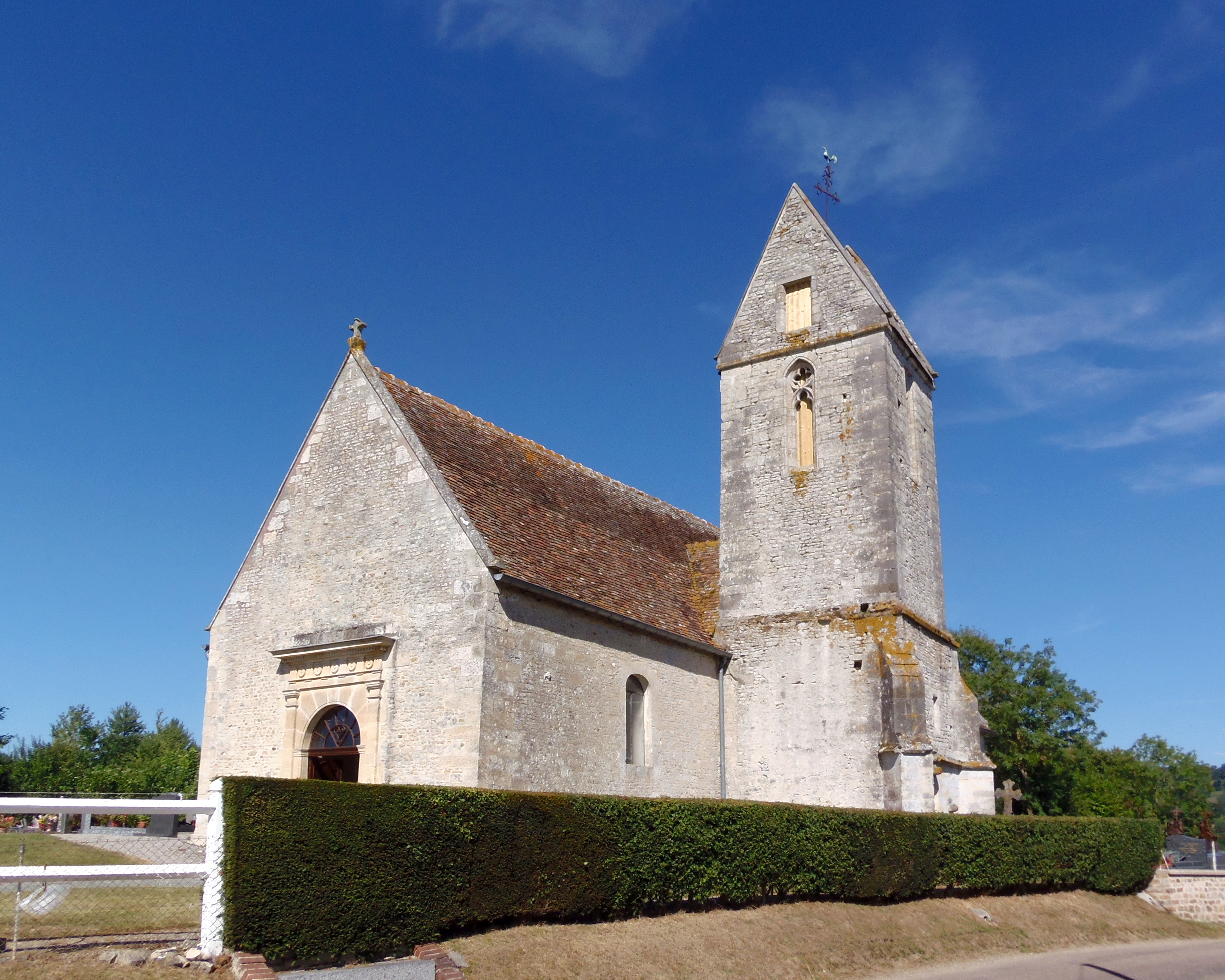
- The church in Montreuil-la-Cambe
- Location of Montreuil-la-Cambe
- Location within France Location within Normandy
- Coordinates: 48°53′02″N 0°03′03″E
- Country: France
- Region: Normandy
- Department: Orne
- Arrondissement: Argentan
- Canton: Argentan-2
- Intercommunality: Terres d'Argentan Interco

Government
  - Mayor (2020–2026): Stanislas Delabasle
- Area^{1}: 9.57 km^{2} (3.69 sq mi)
- Elevation: 260 m (850 ft)
- Highest elevation: 260 m (850 ft)
- Lowest elevation: 74 m (243 ft)
- Population (2023): 80
  - Density: 8.4/km^{2} (22/sq mi)
- Time zone: UTC+01:00 (CET)
  - Summer (DST): UTC+02:00 (CEST)
- INSEE/Postal code: 61291 /61160
- ^{1} French Land Register data, which excludes lakes, ponds, glaciers > 1 km^{2} (0.386 sq mi or 247 acres) and river estuaries.

Montreuil-la-Cambe (French pronunciation: [mɔ̃tʁœj la kɑ̃b]) is a commune in the Orne department in north-western France.

== Geography ==
Montreuil-la-Cambe is made up of the following collection of villages and hamlets, Montreuil Beauvais, Mersan and La Cambe.

The commune along with another 11 communes shares part of a 1,400 hectare, Natura 2000 conservation area, called the Haute Vallée de la Touques et affluents.

== See also ==
- Communes of the Orne department
