= Fontaine-les-Bassets =

- Commune
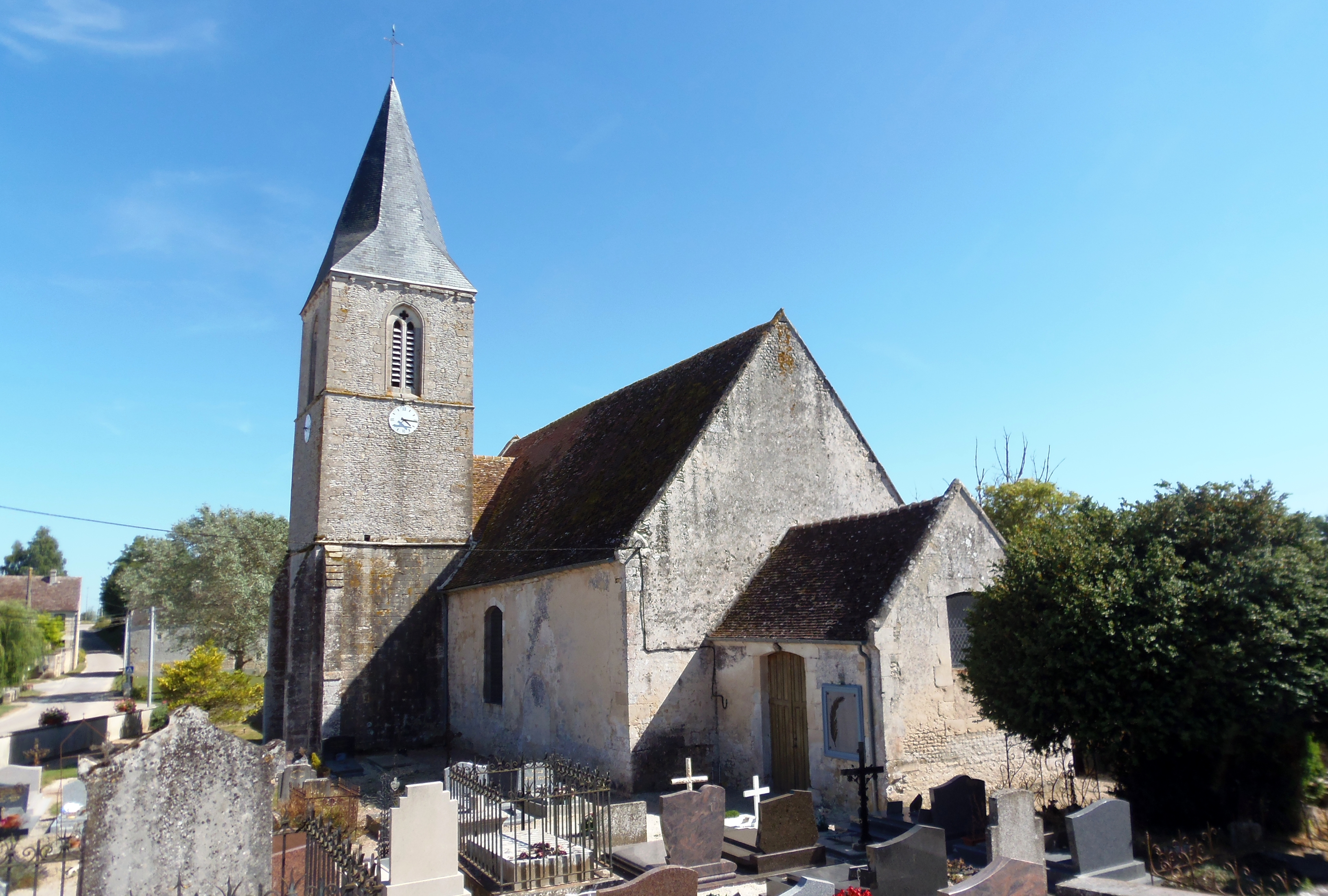
- The church in Fontaine-les-Bassets
- Location of Fontaine-les-Bassets
- Location within France Location within Normandy
- Coordinates: 48°51′35″N 0°00′21″E
- Country: France
- Region: Normandy
- Department: Orne
- Arrondissement: Argentan
- Canton: Argentan-2
- Intercommunality: Terres d'Argentan Interco

Government
  - Mayor (2020–2026): Patrice Verrier
- Area^{1}: 5.88 km^{2} (2.27 sq mi)
- Elevation: 81 m (266 ft)
- Highest elevation: 111 m (364 ft)
- Lowest elevation: 67 m (220 ft)
- Population (2023): 114
  - Density: 19.4/km^{2} (50.2/sq mi)
- Demonym: Fontenois
- Time zone: UTC+01:00 (CET)
  - Summer (DST): UTC+02:00 (CEST)
- INSEE/Postal code: 61171 /61160
- ^{1} French Land Register data, which excludes lakes, ponds, glaciers > 1 km^{2} (0.386 sq mi or 247 acres) and river estuaries.

Fontaine-les-Bassets (French pronunciation: [fɔ̃tɛn le basɛ]) is a commune in the Orne department in north-western France.

== Geography ==
The commune has the River Dives running through it, as well as the Guerard stream.

== Notable buildings and places ==
=== National heritage sites ===
The Commune has 2 buildings and areas listed as a Monument historique

- Château à Fontaine-les-Bassets an eighteenth Century Chateau registered as a Monument historique in 1984
- Dolmen dit Pierre-Levée a Neolithic dolmen registered as a monument historique in 1934
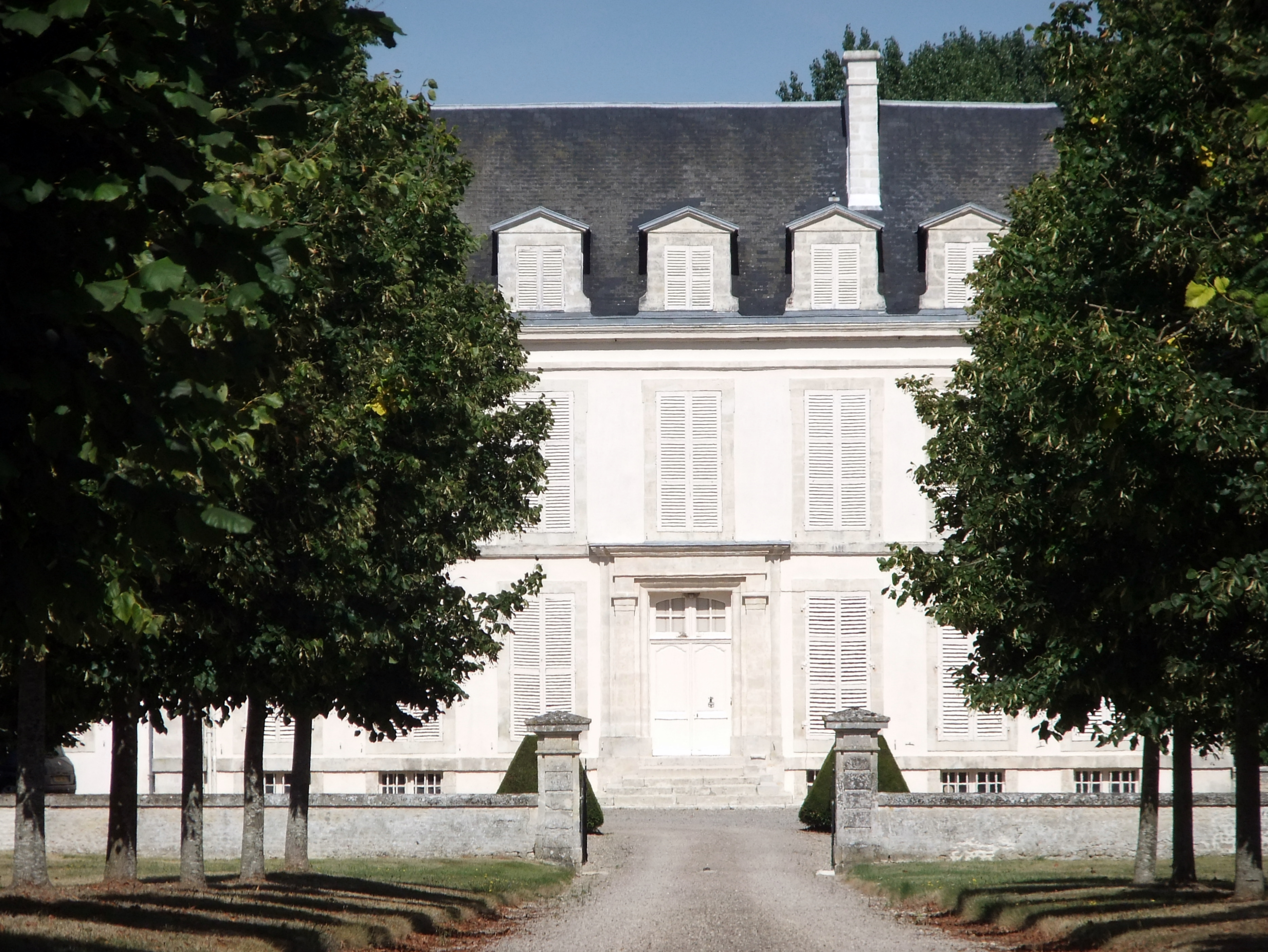
Château de Fontaine-les-Bassets

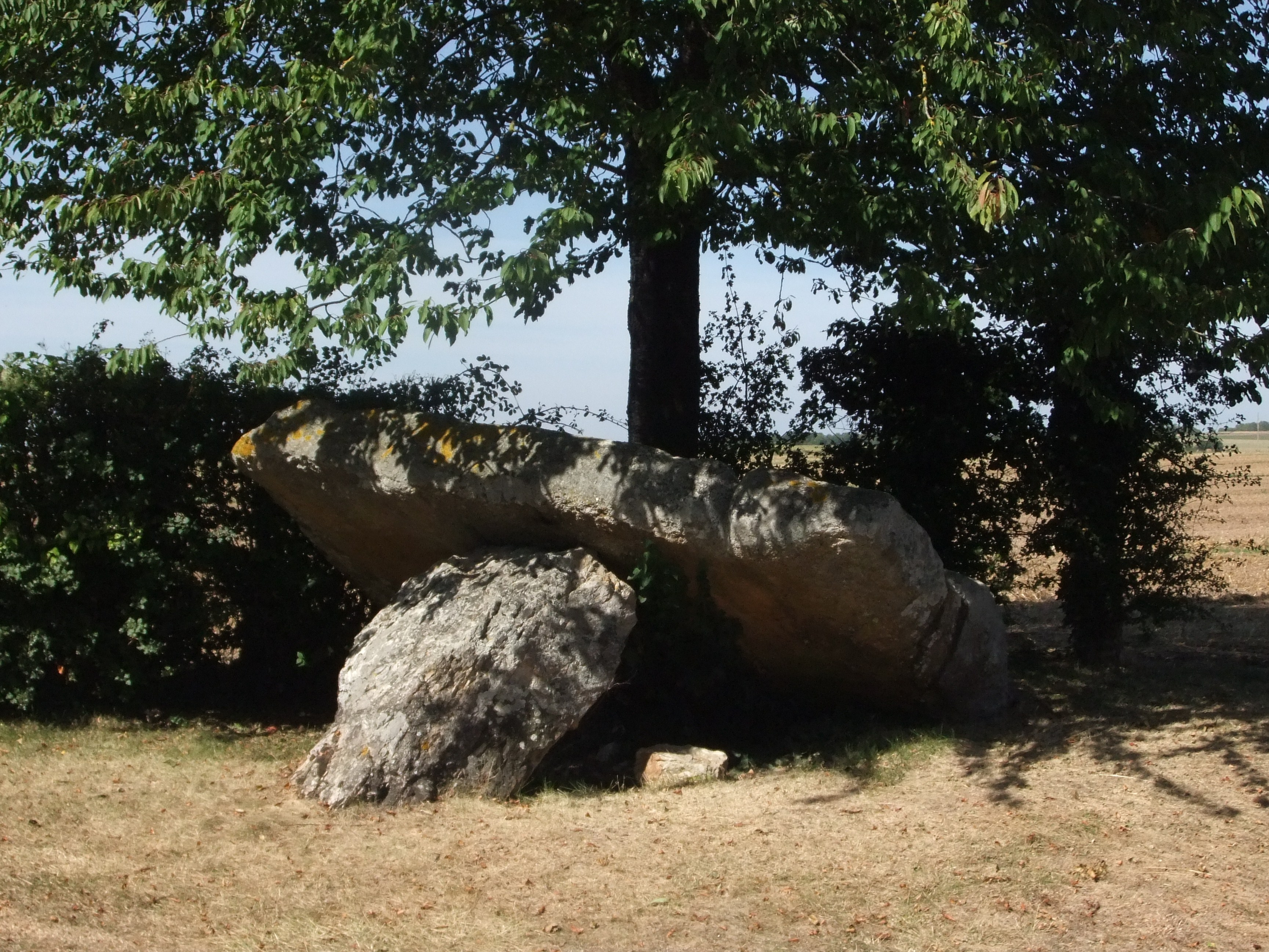
Pierre-Levée Dolmen

== See also ==
- Communes of the Orne department
