= Nécy =

- Commune
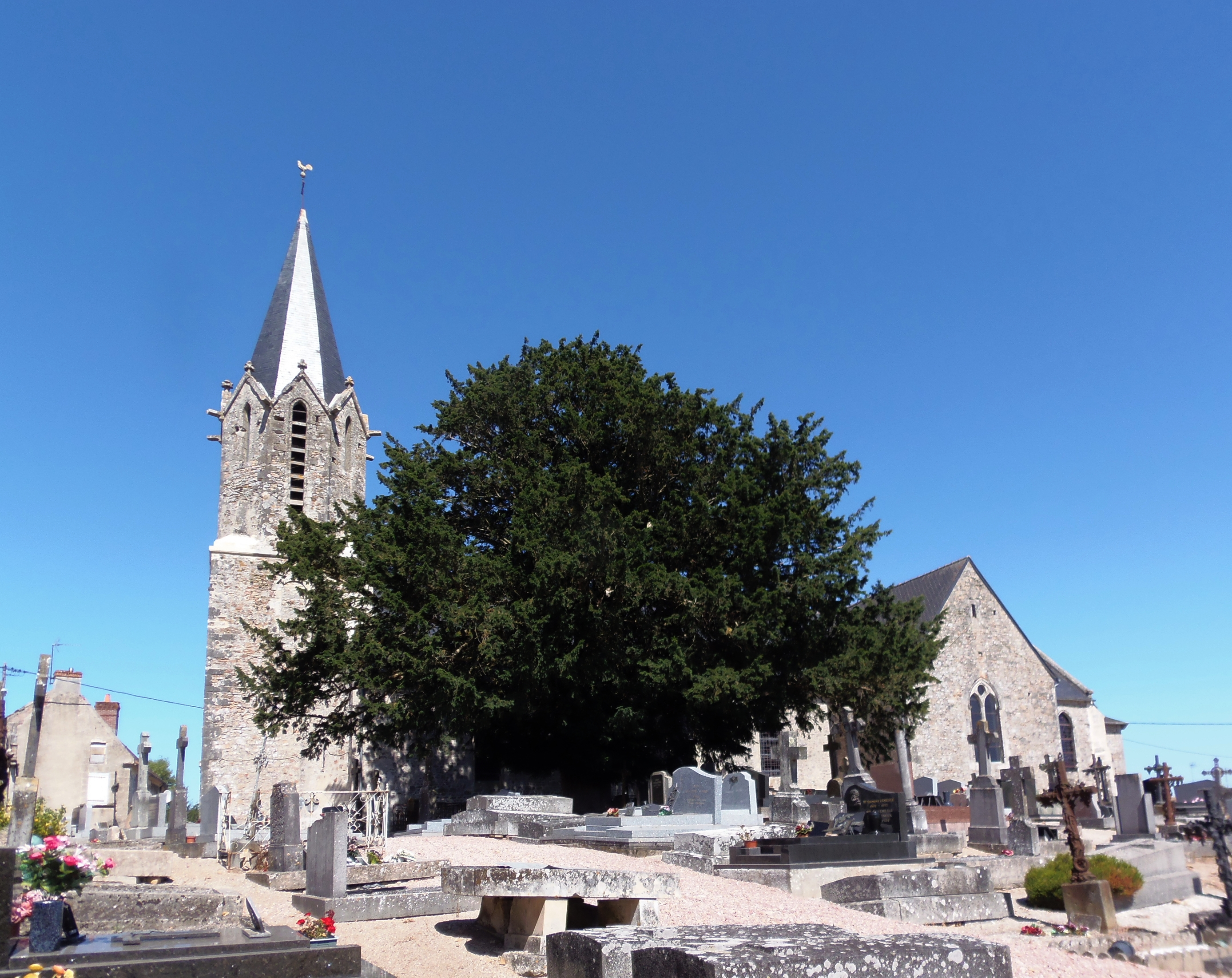
- The church in Nécy
- Location of Nécy
- Location within France Location within Normandy
- Coordinates: 48°49′59″N 0°06′50″W
- Country: France
- Region: Normandy
- Department: Orne
- Arrondissement: Argentan
- Canton: Argentan-1
- Intercommunality: Terres d'Argentan Interco

Government
  - Mayor (2020–2026): Patrick Bellanger
- Area^{1}: 7.80 km^{2} (3.01 sq mi)
- Elevation: 189 m (620 ft)
- Highest elevation: 247 m (810 ft)
- Lowest elevation: 152 m (499 ft)
- Population (2023): 533
  - Density: 68.3/km^{2} (177/sq mi)
- Time zone: UTC+01:00 (CET)
  - Summer (DST): UTC+02:00 (CEST)
- INSEE/Postal code: 61303 /61160
- ^{1} French Land Register data, which excludes lakes, ponds, glaciers > 1 km^{2} (0.386 sq mi or 247 acres) and river estuaries.

Nécy (French pronunciation: [nesi]) is a commune in the Orne department in north-western France.

== Geography ==
The commune is made up of the following collection of villages and hamlets, Necy, Les Requendières, Le Haut de Nécy, La Bergerie and Les Moulins.

The commune has the river Filaine running through it, along with one of its tributaries the Gronde
