= Bailleul, Orne =

Bailleul
- Commune
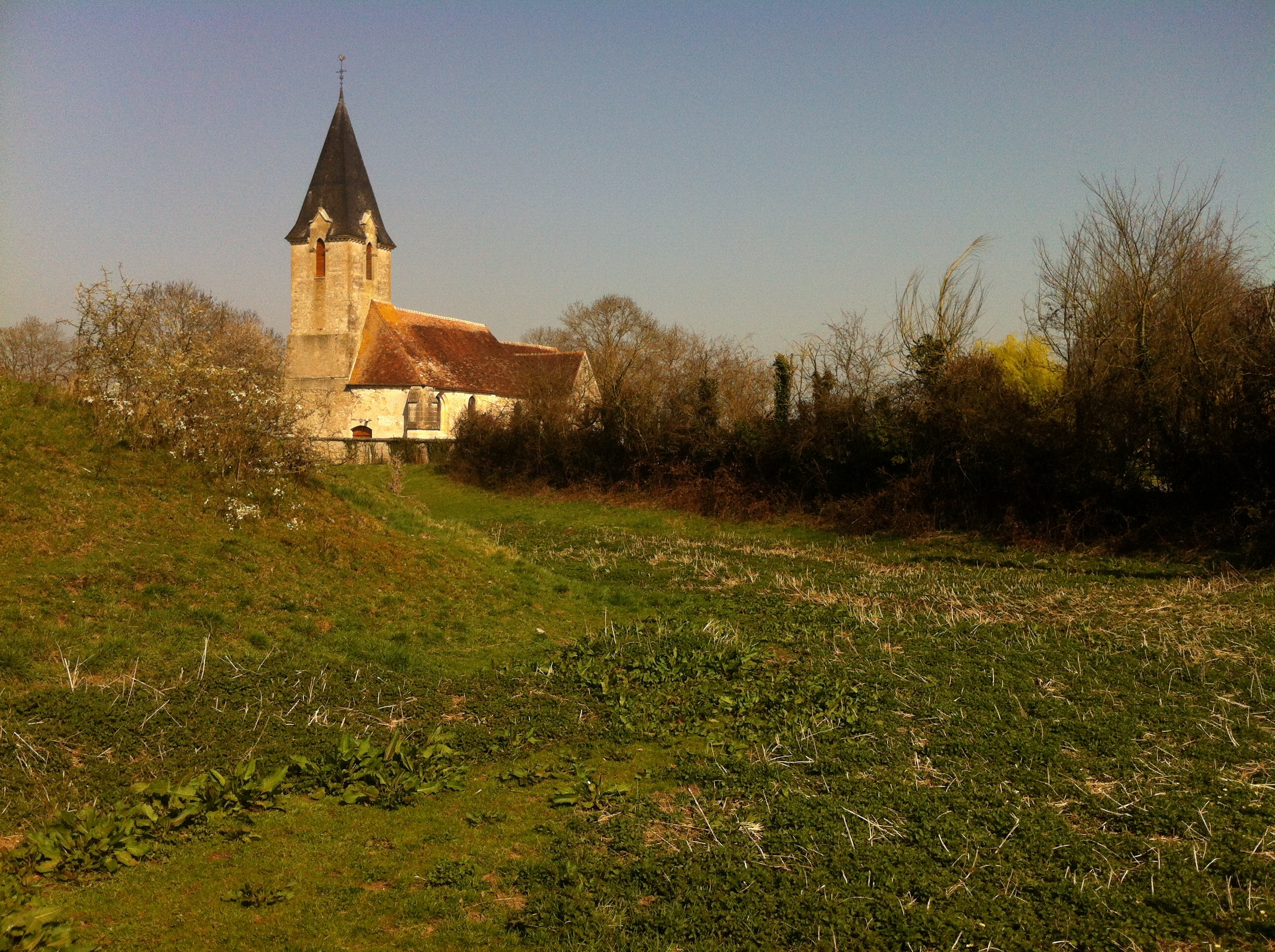
- The church in Bailleul with the motte in foreground
- Location of Bailleul
- Location within France Location within Normandy
- Coordinates: 48°48′02″N 0°00′14″W
- Country: France
- Region: Normandy
- Department: Orne
- Arrondissement: Argentan
- Canton: Argentan-2
- Intercommunality: Terres d'Argentan Interco

Government
  - Mayor (2020–2026): Eric Noss
- Area^{1}: 16.67 km^{2} (6.44 sq mi)
- Elevation: 177 m (581 ft)
- Highest elevation: 237 m (778 ft)
- Lowest elevation: 125 m (410 ft)
- Population (2023): 609
  - Density: 36.5/km^{2} (94.6/sq mi)
- Time zone: UTC+01:00 (CET)
  - Summer (DST): UTC+02:00 (CEST)
- INSEE/Postal code: 61023 /61160
- ^{1} French Land Register data, which excludes lakes, ponds, glaciers > 1 km^{2} (0.386 sq mi or 247 acres) and river estuaries.

Bailleul (French pronunciation: [bajœl]) is a commune in the Orne department in northwestern France.

== Geography ==
The commune is made up of the following collection of villages and hamlets, Fresnaye,La Londe,Vorché and Bailleul.

== Notable buildings and places ==
- Castle Mound of Bailleul is an oval mound from an 11th-century castle that used to exist here.
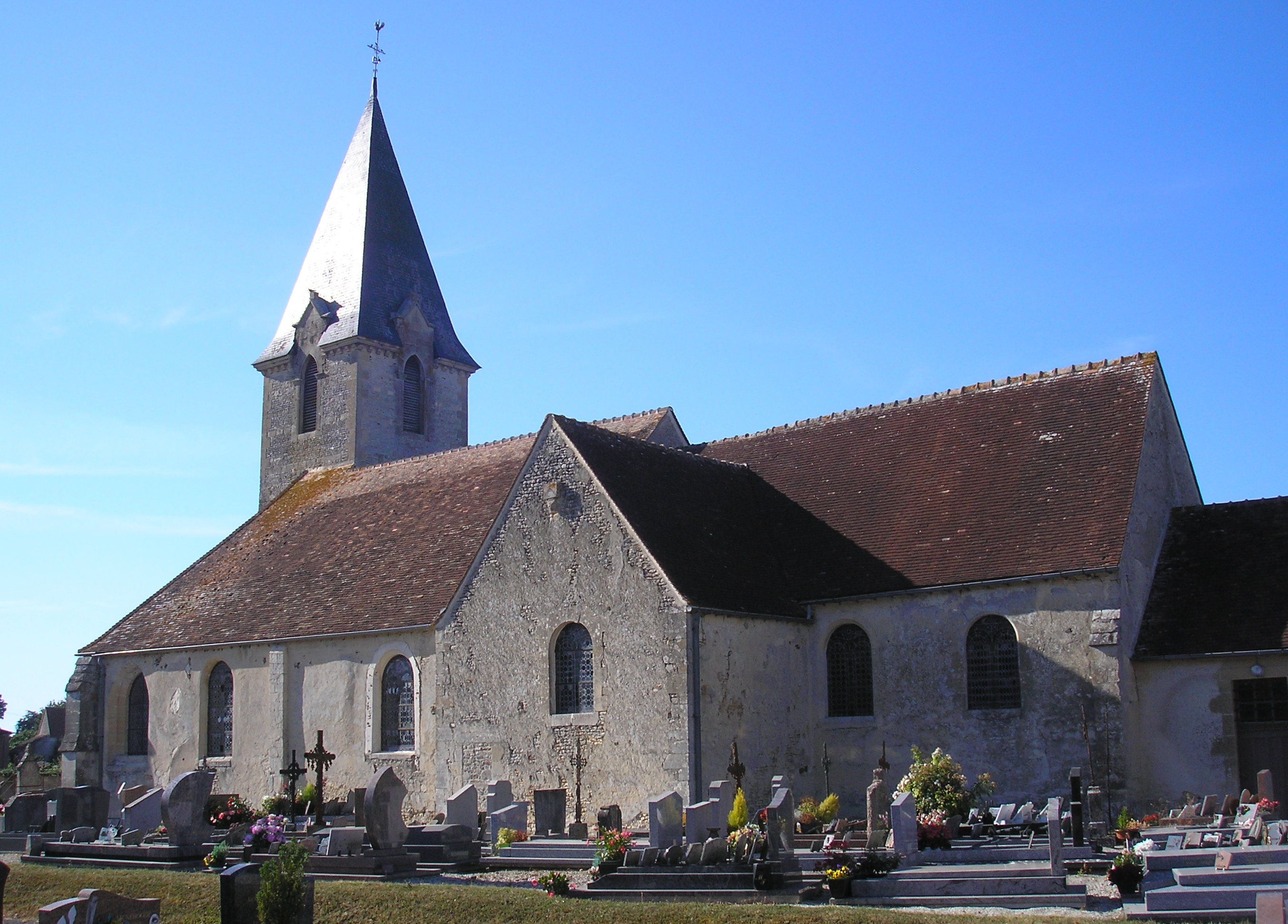
Bailleul Church

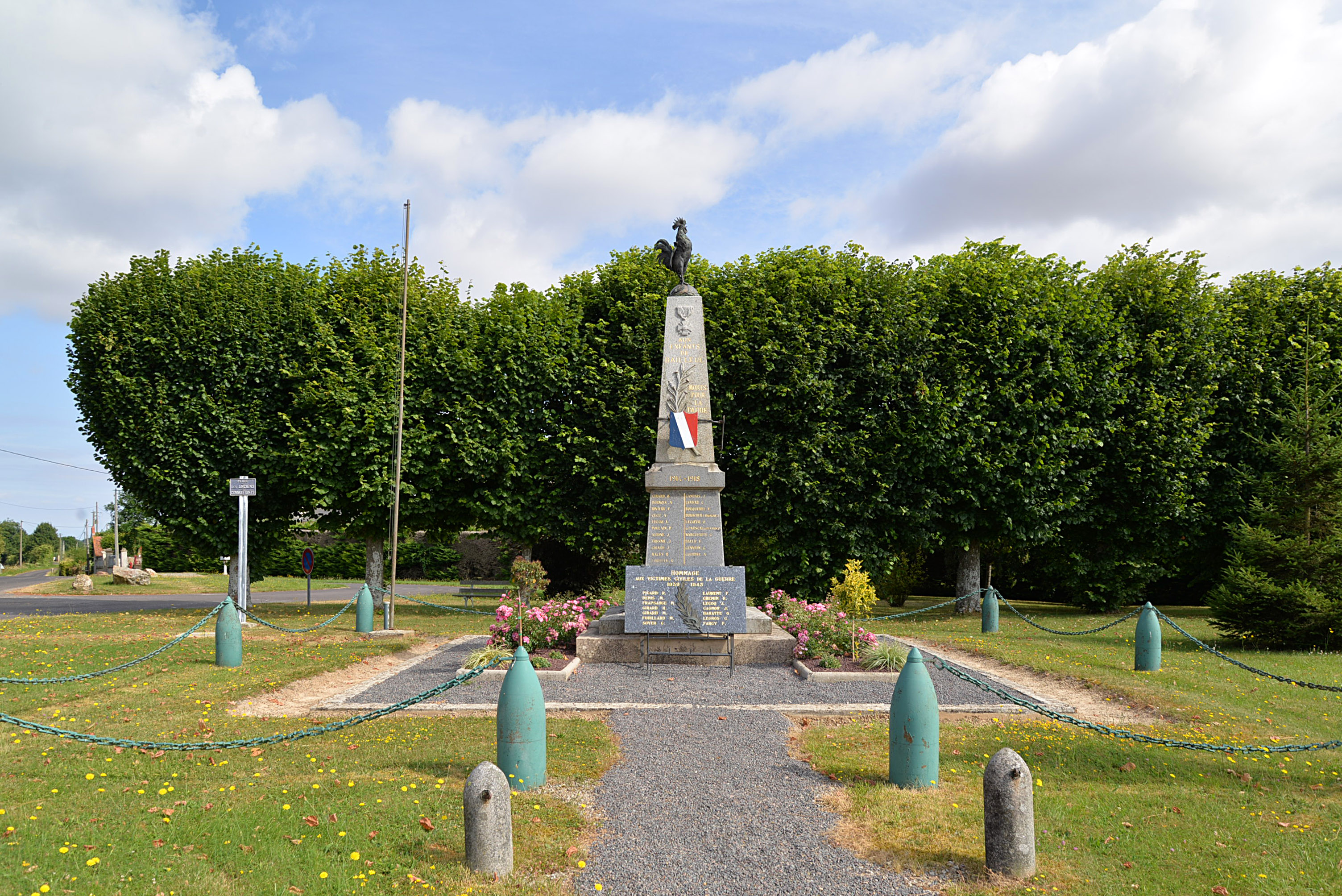
Monument for the dead of Bailleul

== Population ==
Historical population
Year	Pop.	±% p.a.
1968	430	—
1975	523	+2.84%
1982	518	−0.14%
1990	558	+0.93%
1999	603	+0.87%
2007	614	+0.23%
2012	618	+0.13%
2017	608	−0.33%
2023	609	+0.03%
Source: INSEE

== Notable people ==
- Edmond Le Bœuf - (1809 – 1888) a marshal of France died and is buried here.
- Roussel de Bailleul (died 1077), Norman mercenary.

== See also ==
- Communes of the Orne department
