= Trun, Orne =

Trun
- Commune
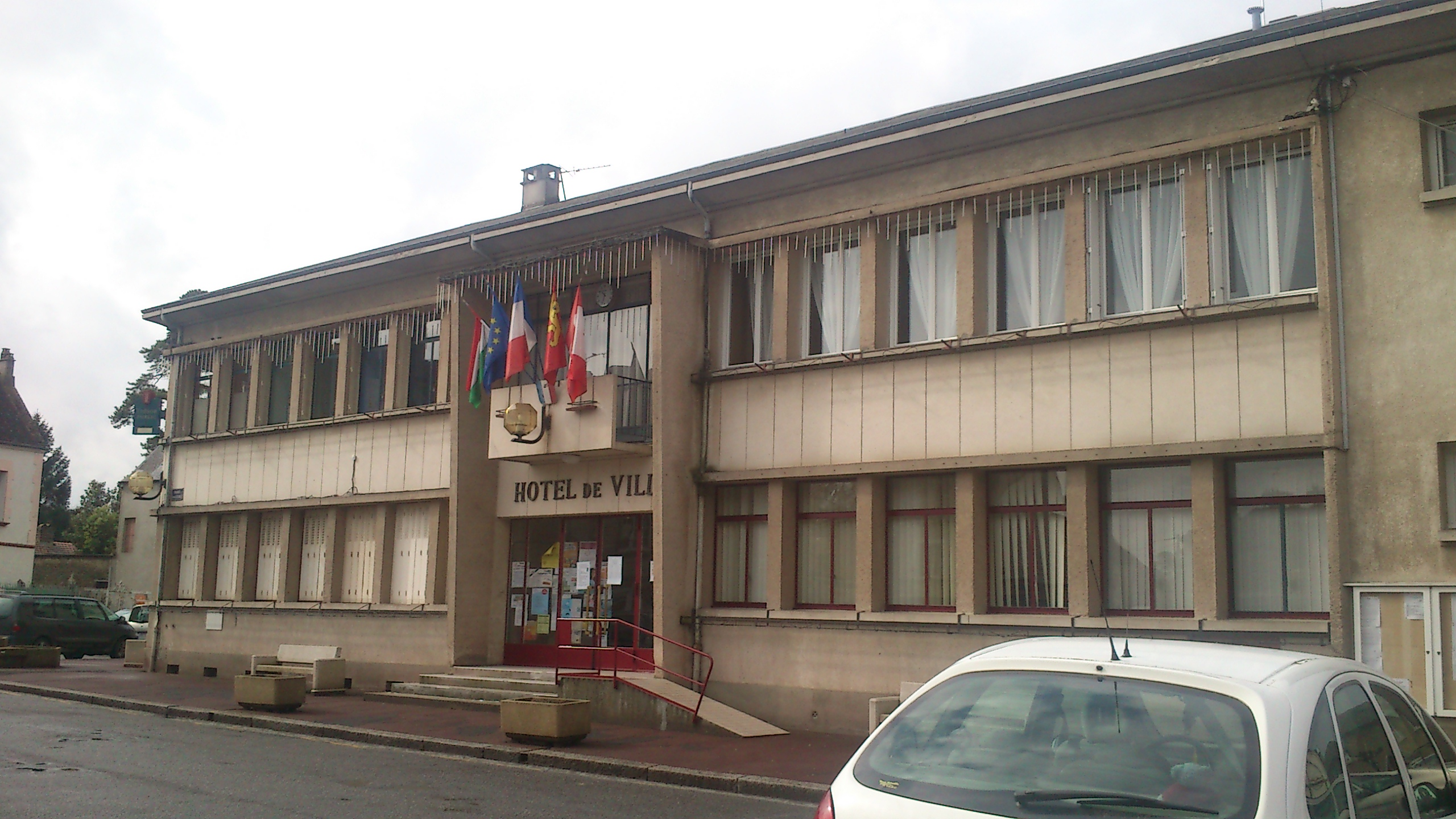
- The town hall in Trun

- Coat of arms
- Location of Trun
- Location within France Location within Normandy
- Coordinates: 48°50′38″N 0°02′02″E
- Country: France
- Region: Normandy
- Department: Orne
- Arrondissement: Argentan
- Canton: Argentan-2
- Intercommunality: Terres d'Argentan Interco

Government
  - Mayor (2020–2026): Jacques Prigent
- Area^{1}: 9.12 km^{2} (3.52 sq mi)
- Elevation: 81 m (266 ft)
- Highest elevation: 151 m (495 ft)
- Lowest elevation: 77 m (253 ft)
- Population (2023): 1,165
  - Density: 128/km^{2} (331/sq mi)
- Time zone: UTC+01:00 (CET)
  - Summer (DST): UTC+02:00 (CEST)
- INSEE/Postal code: 61494 /61160
- ^{1} French Land Register data, which excludes lakes, ponds, glaciers > 1 km^{2} (0.386 sq mi or 247 acres) and river estuaries.

Trun (French pronunciation: [tʁœ̃]) is a commune in the Orne département and the region of Normandy in north-western France.

== Geography ==
The commune is made up of the following collection of villages and hamlets, Magny, Le Ménil Girard and Trun. The commune is spread over an area of 9.12 square kilometres (2,250 acres) with a maximum altitude of 151 metres (495 ft 5 in) and minimum of 77 metres (252 ft 7 in)

The commune is part of the area known as Pays d'Auge.

The commune has the River Dives running through it and a stream the Ruisseau Merdret de.

=== Land distribution ===
The 2018 CORINE Land Cover assessment shows the vast majority of the land in the commune, 61% (560 hectares (1,400 acres)) is Arable land. The rest of the land is Meadows at 28%, Urbanised land at 8% and Heterogeneous agricultural land at 3%.

== Administration ==
List of Mayors
Start	End	Name	Party	Profession
1989	2026	Jacques Prigent	Independent - Left	Lawyer

== Population ==
Historical population
Year	Pop.	±% p.a.
1968	1,378	—
1975	1,344	−0.36%
1982	1,339	−0.05%
1990	1,230	−1.06%
1999	1,307	+0.68%
2007	1,325	+0.17%
2012	1,308	−0.26%
2017	1,245	−0.98%
2023	1,165	−1.10%
Source: INSEE

== Economy ==
- Heller SA, manufacturer of plastic scale model kits.
- Electrical

== Ruins and monuments ==
Aerial photography has revealed the trace of a Gallo-Roman habitat. In the 19th century a Merovingian dynasty necropolis was discovered.

== Personalities associated with Trun ==
- Pierre Crestey 1622–1703, religious follower of Saint Vincent de Paul.

== Twin towns ==
- Fajsz, Hungary.
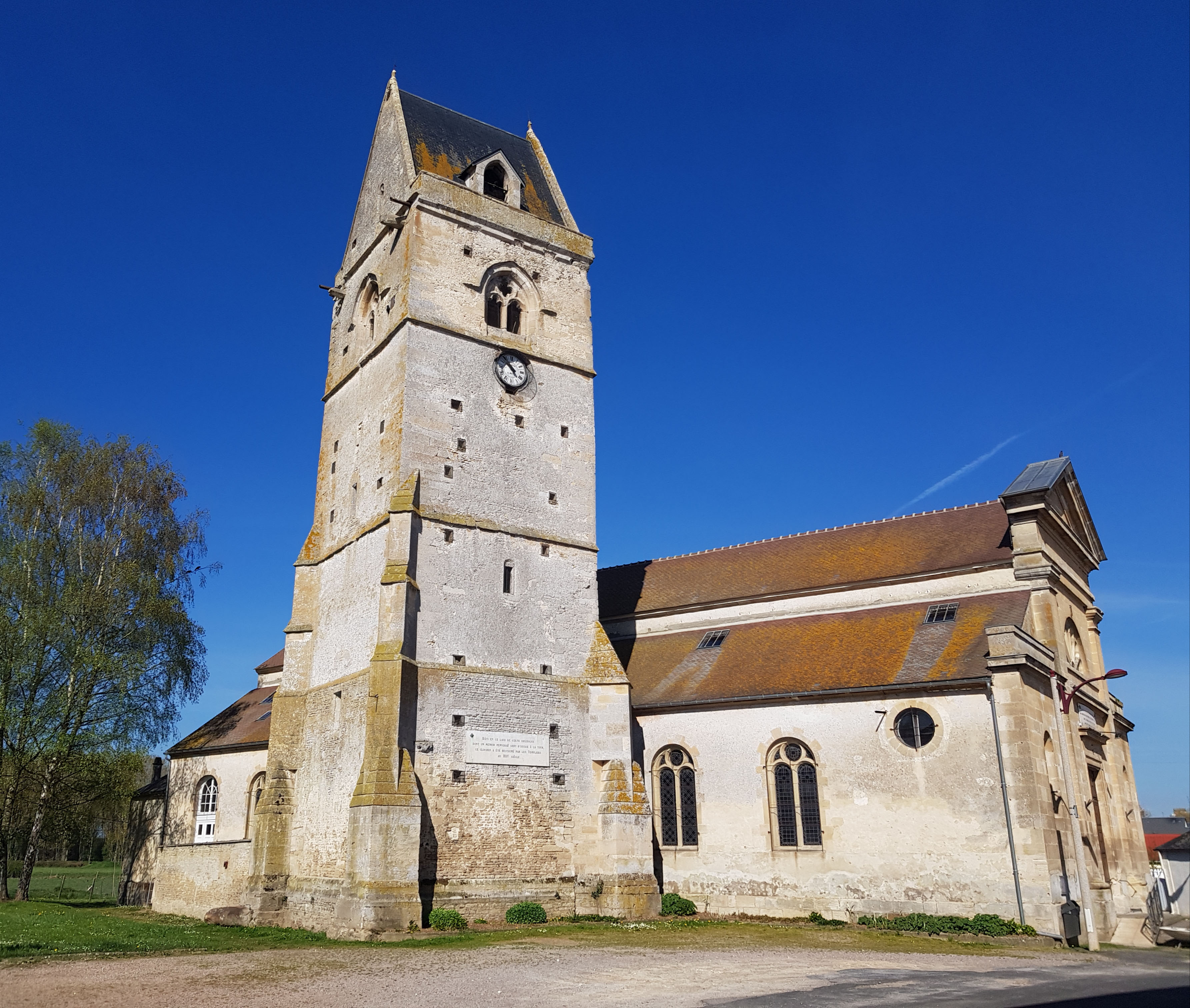
Church of Trun

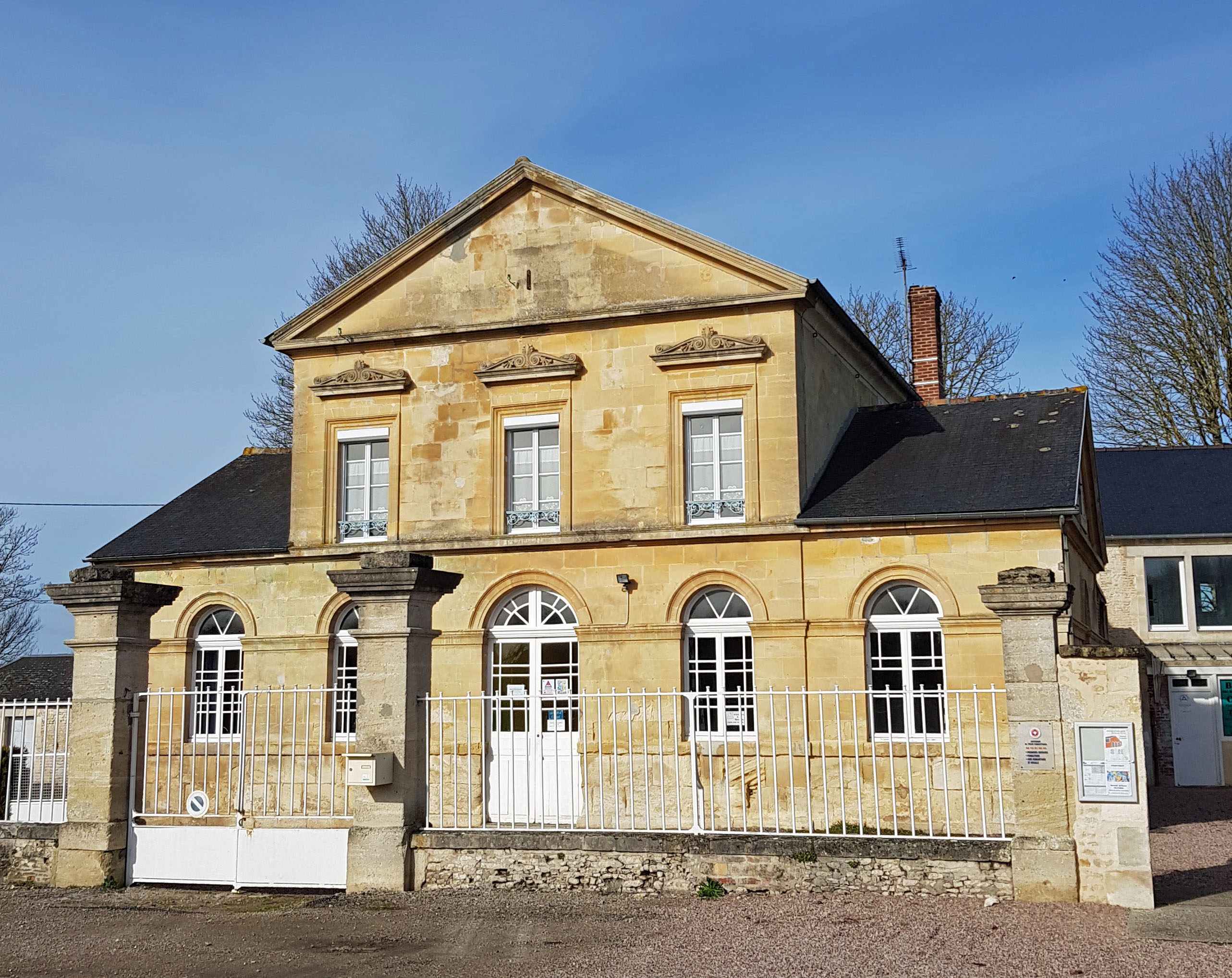
old boarding school for boys

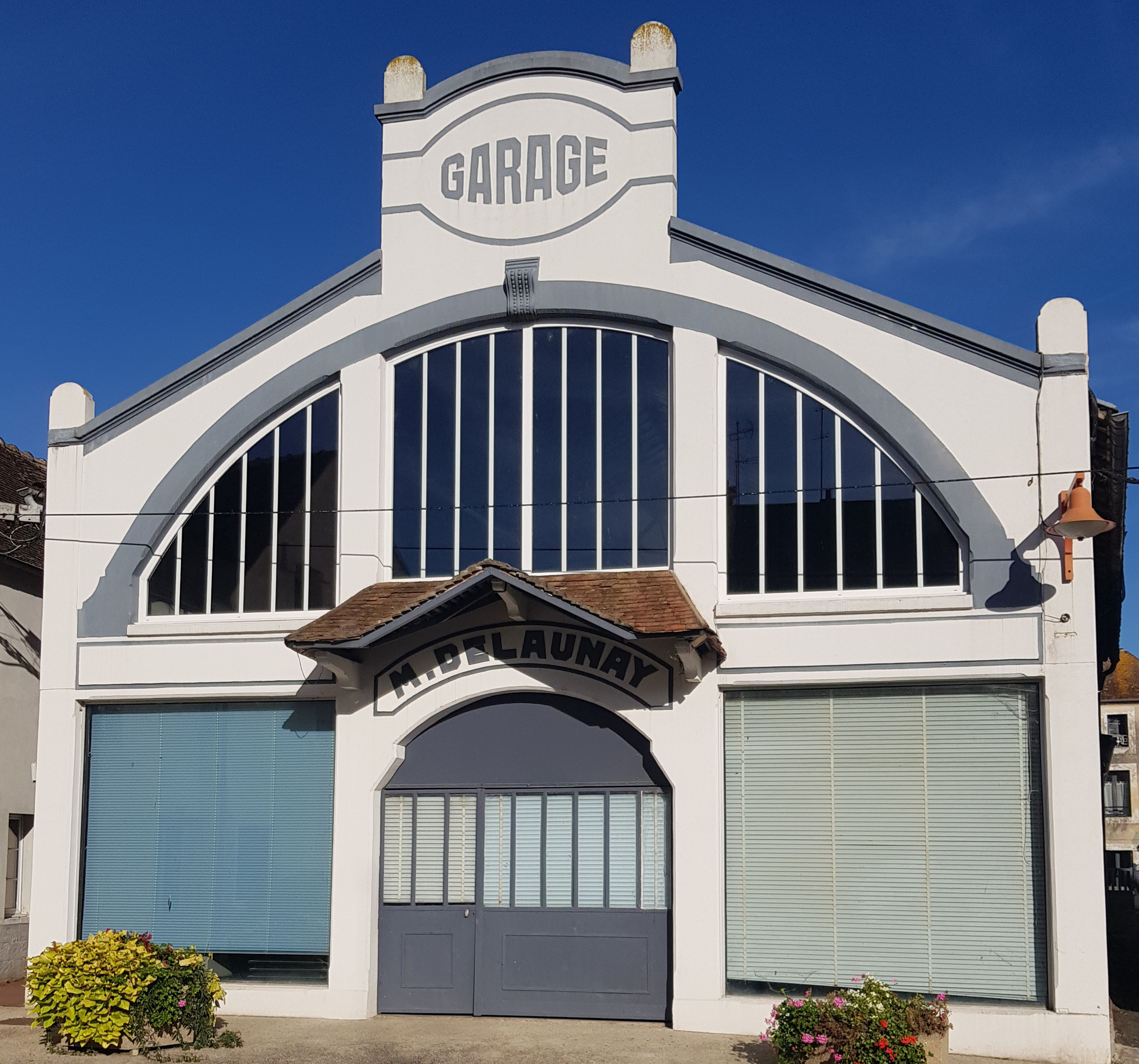
Garage Delaunay

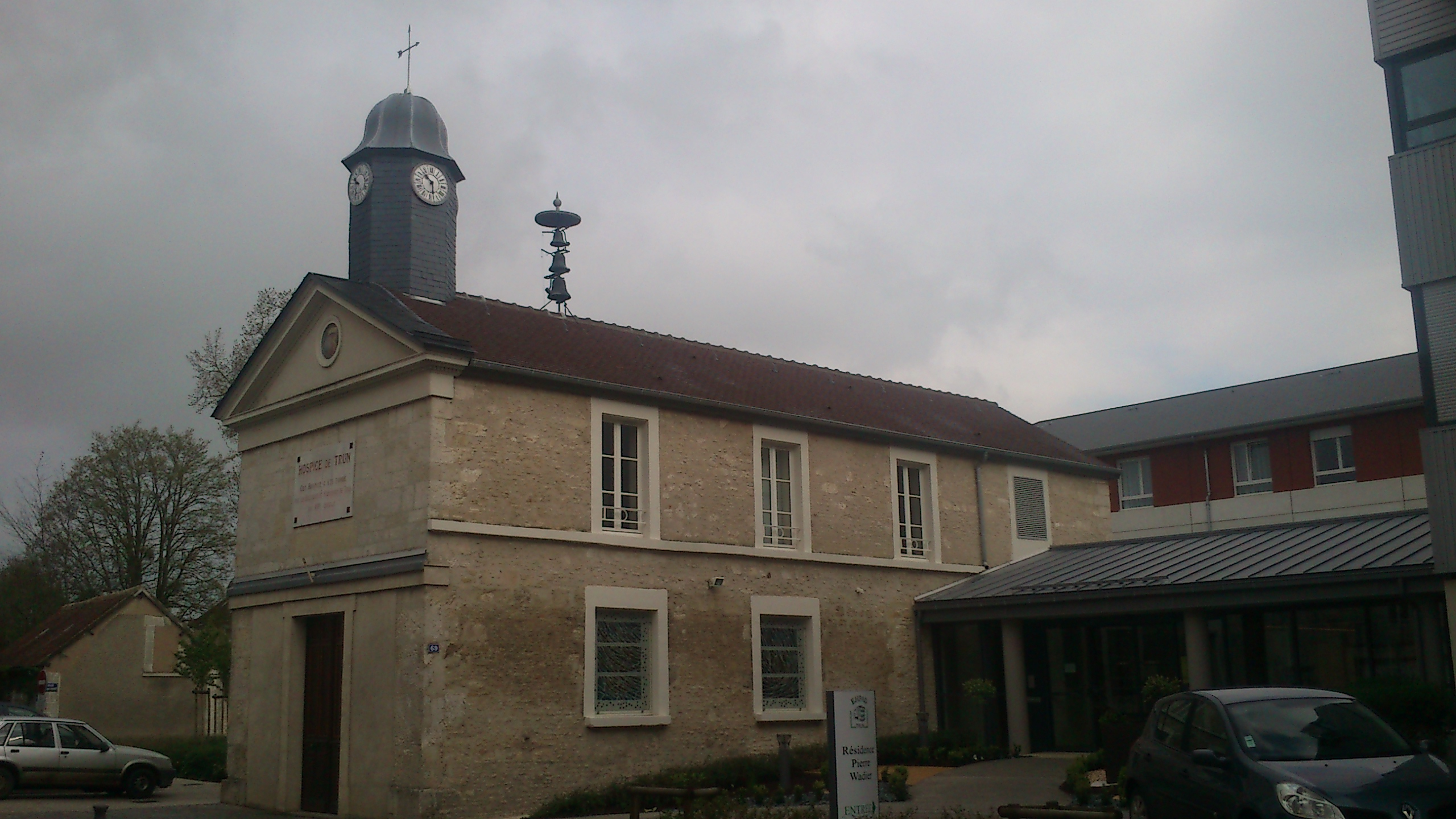
Trun Hospice

== See also ==
- Communes of the Orne department
