= Avoine =

Avoine is the name of the following communes in France:

- Avoine, Indre-et-Loire, in the Indre-et-Loire department
- Avoine, Orne, in the Orne department
