= Saint-Brice-sous-Rânes =

- Commune
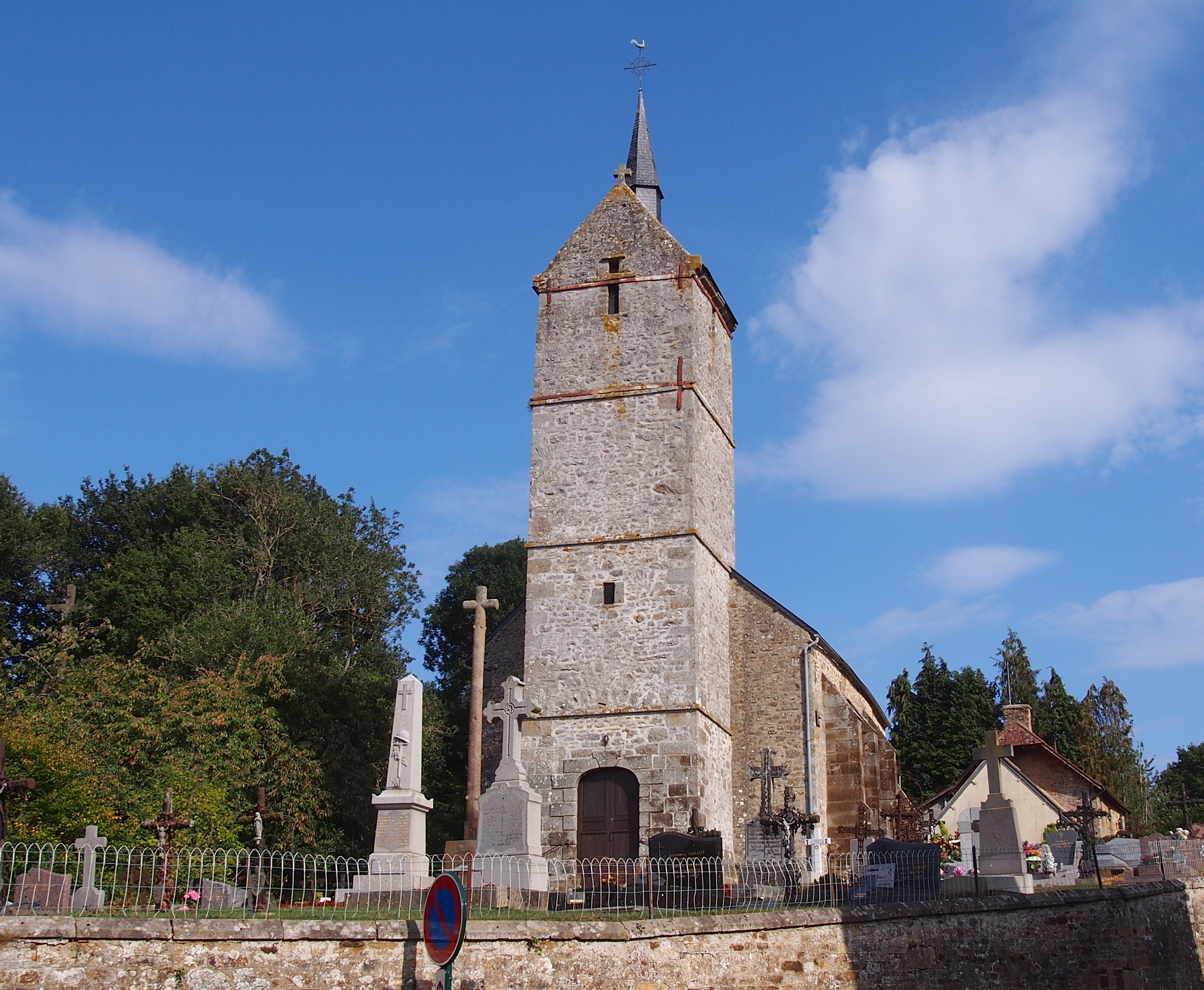
- Location of Saint-Brice-sous-Rânes
- Location within France Location within Normandy
- Coordinates: 48°40′47″N 0°11′29″W
- Country: France
- Region: Normandy
- Department: Orne
- Arrondissement: Argentan
- Canton: Magny-le-Désert
- Intercommunality: Terres d'Argentan Interco

Government
  - Mayor (2020–2026): Katia Guillochin
- Area^{1}: 9.45 km^{2} (3.65 sq mi)
- Elevation: 216 m (709 ft)
- Highest elevation: 249 m (817 ft)
- Lowest elevation: 164 m (538 ft)
- Population (2023): 142
  - Density: 15.0/km^{2} (38.9/sq mi)
- Time zone: UTC+01:00 (CET)
  - Summer (DST): UTC+02:00 (CEST)
- INSEE/Postal code: 61371 /61150
- ^{1} French Land Register data, which excludes lakes, ponds, glaciers > 1 km^{2} (0.386 sq mi or 247 acres) and river estuaries.

Saint-Brice-sous-Rânes (French pronunciation: [sɛ̃ bʁis su ʁan], literally Saint-Brice under Rânes) is a commune in the Orne department in north-western France.

== Geography ==
The commune is made up of the following collection of villages and hamlets, Les Hues,Le Bisson and Saint-Brice-sous-Rânes.

Saint-Brice-sous-Rânes along with another 65 communes is part of a 20,593 hectare, Natura 2000 conservation area, called the Haute vallée de l'Orne et affluents.

There are 5 streams which flow through the commune, the Chalau, the Aunais, the Gosu, la Barbottiere and La Noeve.

== See also ==
- Communes of the Orne department
