= Sainte-Marguerite-de-Carrouges =

- Commune
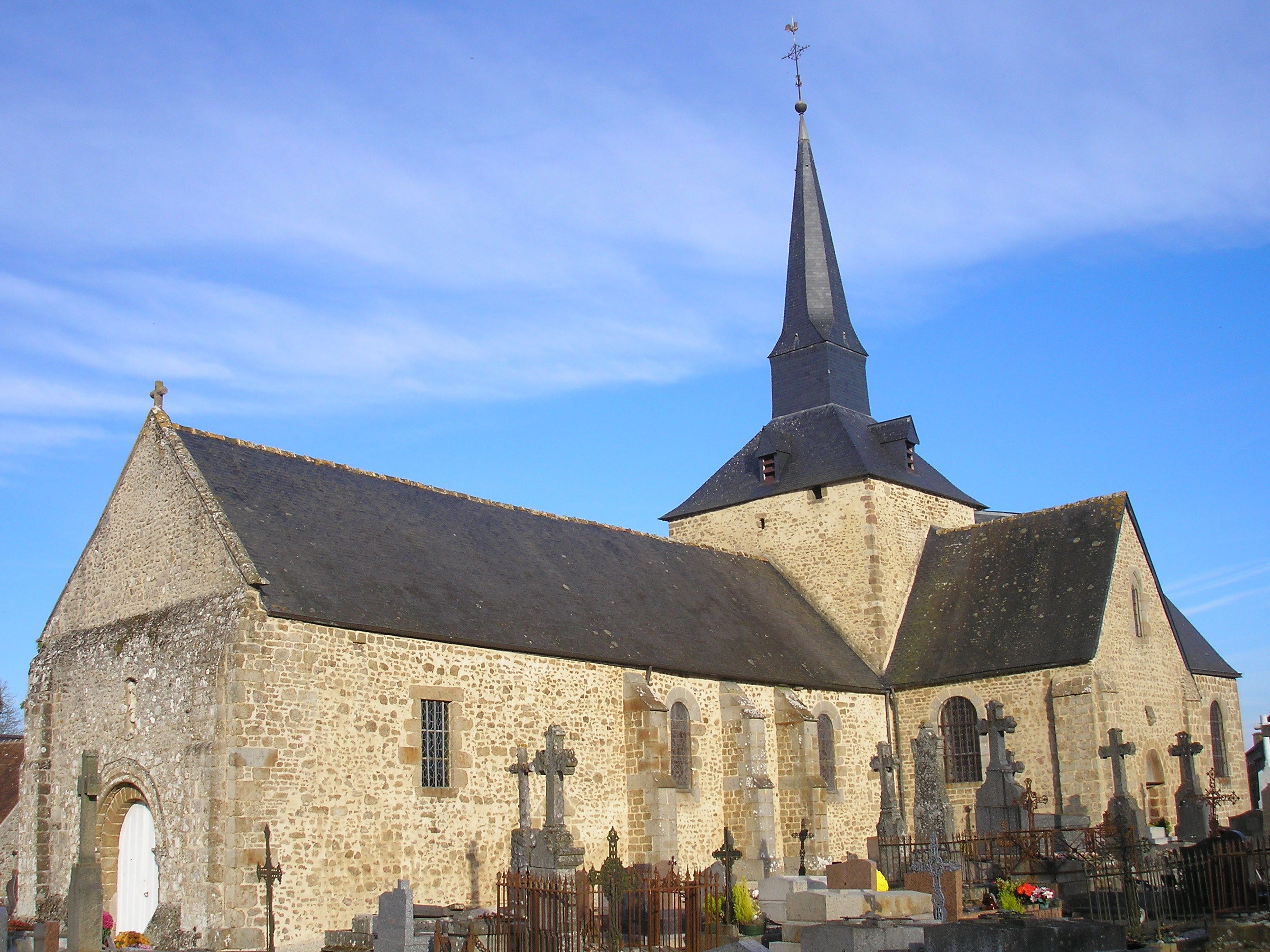
- The church in Sainte-Marguerite-de-Carrouges

- Coat of arms
- Location of Sainte-Marguerite-de-Carrouges
- Location within France Location within Normandy
- Coordinates: 48°35′06″N 0°09′10″W
- Country: France
- Region: Normandy
- Department: Orne
- Arrondissement: Alençon
- Canton: Magny-le-Désert

Government
  - Mayor (2020–2026): Jean-Yves Portier
- Area^{1}: 8.69 km^{2} (3.36 sq mi)
- Elevation: 279 m (915 ft)
- Highest elevation: 291 m (955 ft)
- Lowest elevation: 200 m (660 ft)
- Population (2023): 210
  - Density: 24/km^{2} (63/sq mi)
- Time zone: UTC+01:00 (CET)
  - Summer (DST): UTC+02:00 (CEST)
- INSEE/Postal code: 61419 /61320
- ^{1} French Land Register data, which excludes lakes, ponds, glaciers > 1 km^{2} (0.386 sq mi or 247 acres) and river estuaries.

Sainte-Marguerite-de-Carrouges (French pronunciation: [sɛ̃t maʁɡərit də kaʁuʒ], literally Sainte-Marguerite of Carrouges) is a commune in the Orne department in north-western France. As of 2021, the commune had a total population of 211 residents.

The commune is named for Marguerite de Carrouges (née de Thibouville; 1362, Château de Fontaine-la-Soret, Eure. Normandy – c. 1419), a French noblewoman and the wife of Sir Jean de Carrouges, Viscount of Bellême (c. 1330s, Carrouges, Normandy – 25 September 1396, Nicopolis, Ottoman Empire).

== Geography ==
The commune is made up of the following collection of villages and hamlets, L'Aubesniére, Le Grand Chandon, La Bissonnière, La Blanchardière, La Bommerie, L'Être Gautier, L'Être Blanchet, Ste Marguerite Carrouges, L'Être Chapelle and Sainte-Marguerite-de-Carrouges.

It is 870 hectares (3.4 sq mi) in size. The highest point in the commune is 272 metres (892 ft).

The commune is within the Normandie-Maine Regional Natural Park.

Sainte-Marguerite-de-Carrouges along with another 65 communes is part of a 20,593 hectare, Natura 2000 conservation area, called the Haute vallée de l'Orne et affluents.

The commune has one river, the Udon, with three streams, Grand Pied, Moulin de Besnard and Coupigny, which are the only watercourses flowing through its borders.

== Notable buildings and places ==
=== National heritage sites ===
Sainte-Marguerite-de-Carrouges Church a 12th century church, which was classified as a Monument historique in 1978.

== See also ==
- Communes of the Orne department
- Parc naturel régional Normandie-Maine
