= Saint-Sauveur-de-Carrouges =

- Commune
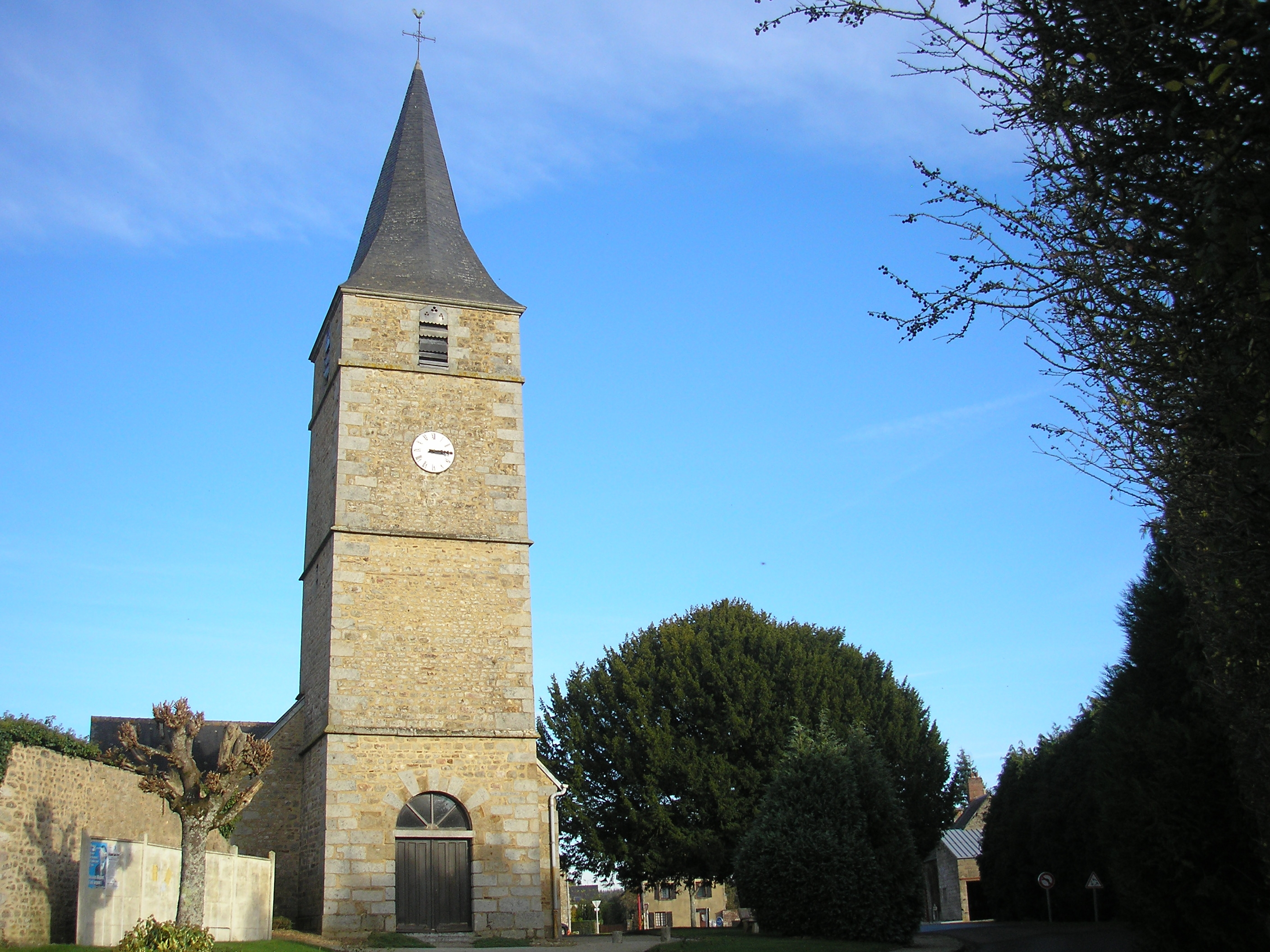
- The church in Saint-Sauveur-de-Carrouges
- Location of Saint-Sauveur-de-Carrouges
- Location within France Location within Normandy
- Coordinates: 48°35′12″N 0°06′21″W
- Country: France
- Region: Normandy
- Department: Orne
- Arrondissement: Alençon
- Canton: Magny-le-Désert

Government
  - Mayor (2020–2026): Jean-Pierre Trouillot
- Area^{1}: 11.42 km^{2} (4.41 sq mi)
- Elevation: 325 m (1,066 ft)
- Highest elevation: 356 m (1,168 ft)
- Lowest elevation: 209 m (686 ft)
- Population (2023): 236
  - Density: 20.7/km^{2} (53.5/sq mi)
- Time zone: UTC+01:00 (CET)
  - Summer (DST): UTC+02:00 (CEST)
- INSEE/Postal code: 61453 /61320
- ^{1} French Land Register data, which excludes lakes, ponds, glaciers > 1 km^{2} (0.386 sq mi or 247 acres) and river estuaries.

Saint-Sauveur-de-Carrouges (French pronunciation: [sɛ̃ sovœʁ də kaʁuʒ], literally Saint-Saviour of Carrouges) is a commune in the Orne department in north-western France. As of 2021, the commune had a total population of 243 residents.

== Geography ==
The commune is made up of the following collection of villages and hamlets, L'Être És Pont, Le Fay, Gros Fay, La Druitière, Les Noës, Le Bois Bonnevent, L'Être Logeard, L'Être Mathieu, La Noé, Les Érables and Saint-Sauveur-de-Carrouges.

It is 1,140 hectares (4.4 sq mi) in size. The highest point in the commune is 313 metres (1,027 ft).

The commune is within the Normandie-Maine Regional Natural Park and Forêt d'Écouves.

Saint-Sauveur-de-Carrouges along with another 65 communes is part of a 20,593 hectare, Natura 2000 conservation area, called the Haute vallée de l'Orne et affluents.

The commune has five streams flowing through it, Grand Pied, Moulin de Besnard, Coupigny, Landelles and the Gue de la Heze.

== See also ==
- Communes of the Orne department
- Parc naturel régional Normandie-Maine
