= La Motte-Fouquet =

- Commune
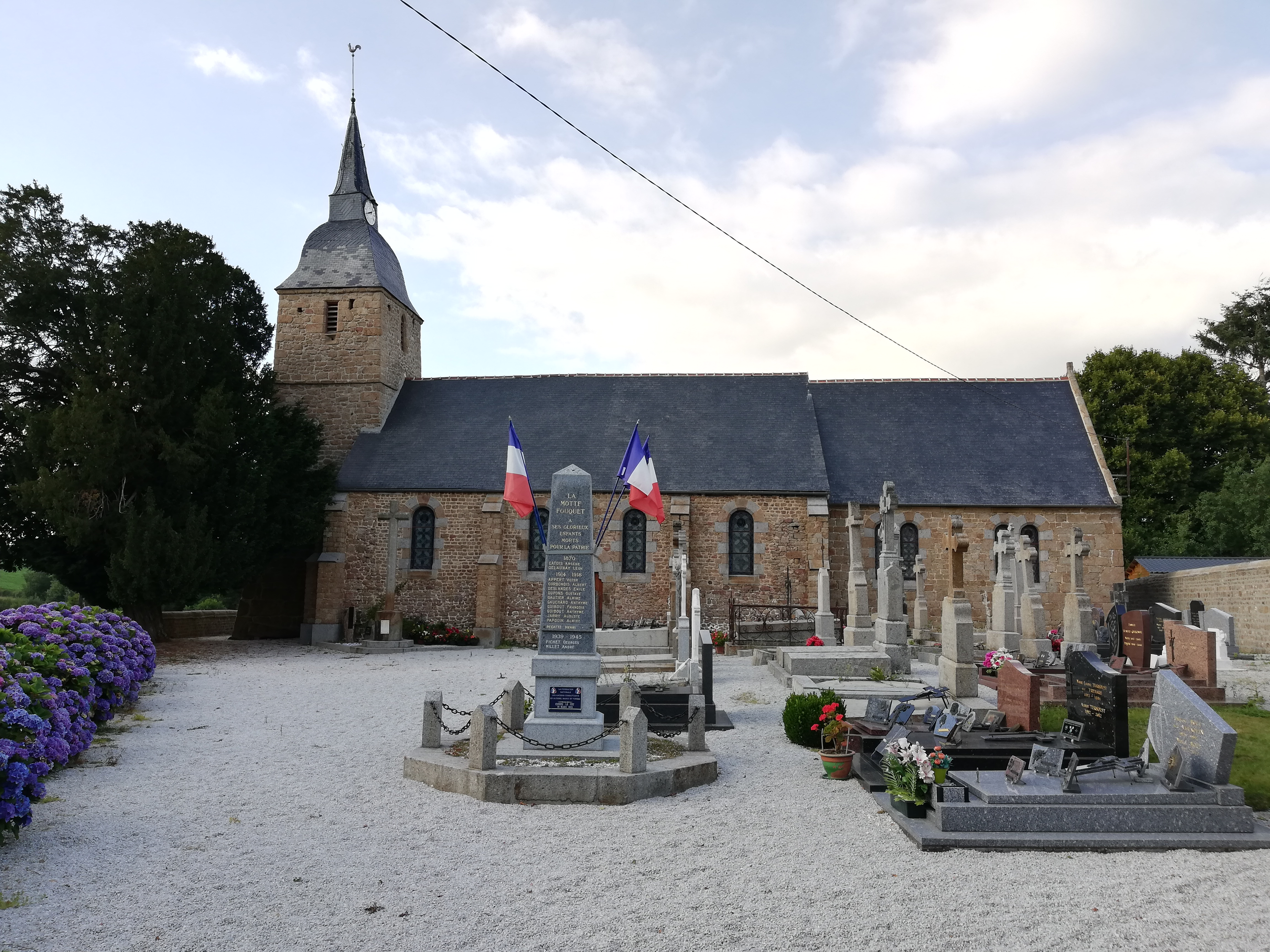
- Location of La Motte-Fouquet
- Location within France Location within Normandy
- Coordinates: 48°34′08″N 0°17′02″W
- Country: France
- Region: Normandy
- Department: Orne
- Arrondissement: Alençon
- Canton: Magny-le-Désert
- Intercommunality: Pays fertois et Bocage carrougien

Government
  - Mayor (2020–2026): Jean Luc Lemercier
- Area^{1}: 9.32 km^{2} (3.60 sq mi)
- Elevation: 250 m (820 ft)
- Highest elevation: 320 m (1,050 ft)
- Lowest elevation: 195 m (640 ft)
- Population (2023): 156
  - Density: 16.7/km^{2} (43.4/sq mi)
- Time zone: UTC+01:00 (CET)
  - Summer (DST): UTC+02:00 (CEST)
- INSEE/Postal code: 61295 /61600
- ^{1} French Land Register data, which excludes lakes, ponds, glaciers > 1 km^{2} (0.386 sq mi or 247 acres) and river estuaries.

La Motte-Fouquet (French pronunciation: [la mɔt fukɛ]) is a commune in the Orne department in north-western France.

== Geography ==
The commune is made up of the following collection of villages and hamlets, Le Plessis, Duret, La Motte-Fouquet and La Rallière.

The commune is in the Normandie-Maine Regional Natural Park.

== Points of interest ==
=== National heritage sites ===
- Château de la Motte seventeenth century chateau, that was registered as a Monument historique 1980.

== See also ==
- Communes of the Orne department
- Parc naturel régional Normandie-Maine
