= Vieux-Pont =

- Commune
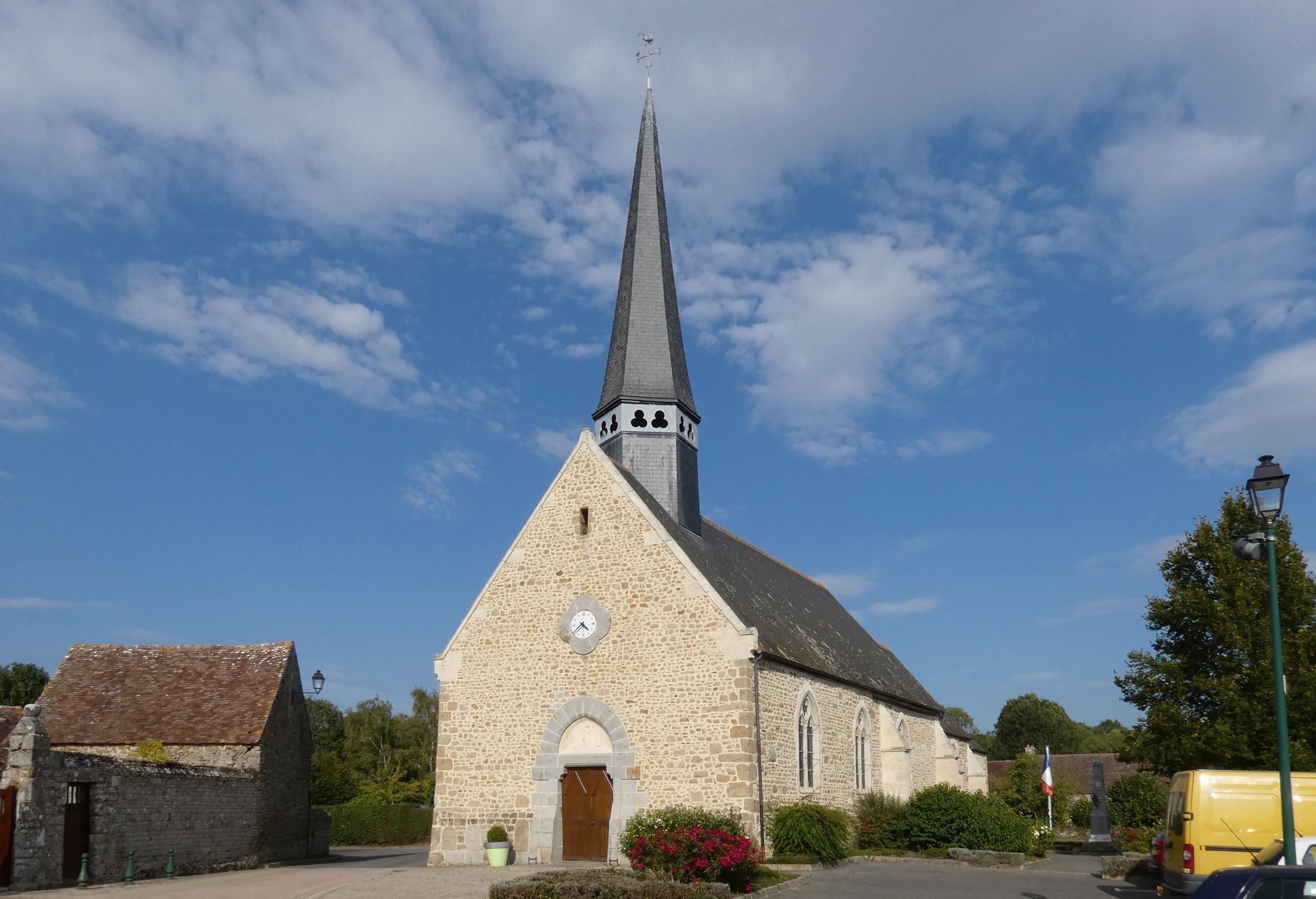
- The church in Vieux-Pont
- Location of Vieux-Pont
- Location within France Location within Normandy
- Coordinates: 48°39′05″N 0°08′37″W
- Country: France
- Region: Normandy
- Department: Orne
- Arrondissement: Argentan
- Canton: Magny-le-Désert
- Intercommunality: Terres d'Argentan Interco

Government
  - Mayor (2020–2026): Daniel Berrier
- Area^{1}: 9.67 km^{2} (3.73 sq mi)
- Elevation: 185 m (607 ft)
- Highest elevation: 228 m (748 ft)
- Lowest elevation: 169 m (554 ft)
- Population (2023): 202
  - Density: 20.9/km^{2} (54.1/sq mi)
- Time zone: UTC+01:00 (CET)
  - Summer (DST): UTC+02:00 (CEST)
- INSEE/Postal code: 61503 /61150
- ^{1} French Land Register data, which excludes lakes, ponds, glaciers > 1 km^{2} (0.386 sq mi or 247 acres) and river estuaries.

Vieux-Pont (French pronunciation: [vjø pɔ̃]) is a commune in the Orne department in north-western France.

== Geography ==
The commune is made up of the following collection of villages and hamlets, La Courcière, La Harlière, Troussel, Le Bois au Brun and Vieux-Pont.

Parts of the commune make up the area, the Plaine d'Argentan, which is known for its cereal growing fileds and horse stud farms.

Vieux-Pont along with another 65 communes is part of a 20,593 hectare, Natura 2000 conservation area, called the Haute vallée de l'Orne et affluents.

It is 970 hectares (3.7 sq mi) in size. The highest point in the commune is 186 metres (610 ft).

The river Udon along with three streams, the Rouvray, la Harliere and the Moulin de Besnard are the four watercourses that traverse the commune.

== Notable buildings and places ==
=== National heritage sites ===
Manor known as Le Désert a 17th century Manor house, used for meetings by the Chouannerie during the French Revolution, was classified as a Monument historique in 1995.

== See also ==
- Communes of the Orne department
