= Sainte-Marie-la-Robert =

- Commune
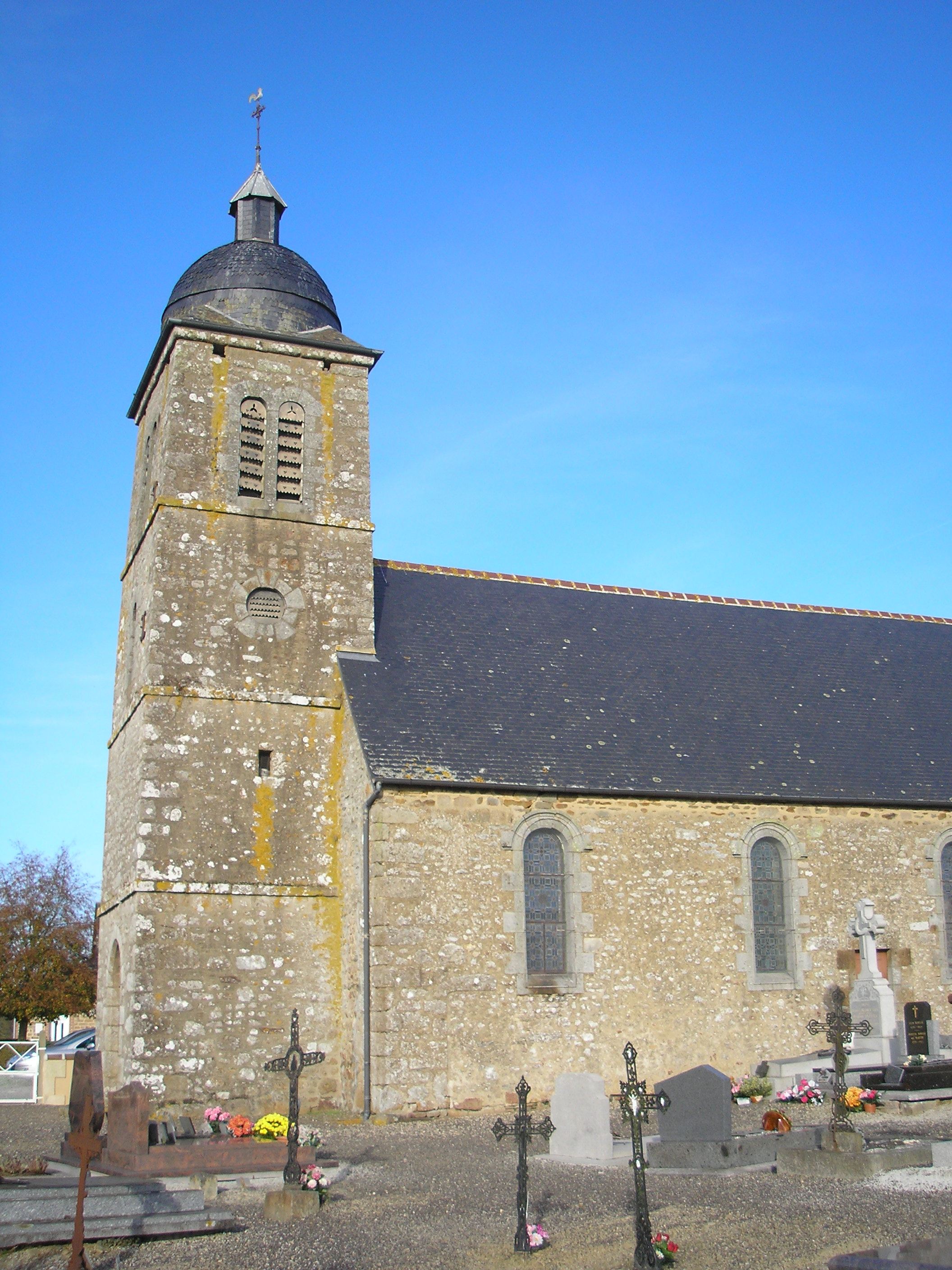
- The church in Sainte-Marie-la-Robert
- Location of Sainte-Marie-la-Robert
- Location within France Location within Normandy
- Coordinates: 48°37′27″N 0°09′19″W
- Country: France
- Region: Normandy
- Department: Orne
- Arrondissement: Alençon
- Canton: Magny-le-Désert

Government
  - Mayor (2020–2026): Jean-Paul Huette
- Area^{1}: 5.45 km^{2} (2.10 sq mi)
- Elevation: 200 m (660 ft)
- Highest elevation: 269 m (883 ft)
- Lowest elevation: 183 m (600 ft)
- Population (2023): 86
  - Density: 16/km^{2} (41/sq mi)
- Time zone: UTC+01:00 (CET)
  - Summer (DST): UTC+02:00 (CEST)
- INSEE/Postal code: 61420 /61320
- ^{1} French Land Register data, which excludes lakes, ponds, glaciers > 1 km^{2} (0.386 sq mi or 247 acres) and river estuaries.

Sainte-Marie-la-Robert (French pronunciation: [sɛ̃t maʁi la ʁɔbɛʁ]) is a commune in the Orne department in north-western France. As of 2023, the population of the commune was 86.

== Geography ==
The commune is made up of the following collection of villages and hamlets, La Sorière, La Chabossière and Sainte-Marie-la-Robert.

The commune is within the Normandie-Maine Regional Natural Park.

Sainte-Marie-la-Robert along with another 65 communes is part of a 20,593 hectare, Natura 2000 conservation area, called the Haute vallée de l'Orne et affluents.

It is 550 hectares (2.1 sq mi) in size. The highest point in the commune is 207 metres (679 ft).

The river Udon along with two streams, the Coupigny and the Moulin de Besnard are the three watercourses that traverse the commune.

== Politics and administration ==
Sainte-Marie-la-Robert is governed by a conseil municipal composed of seven members, consisting of both a mayor and deputy mayor.

List of Mayors of Sainte-Marie-la-Robert
In office		Name	Party	Quality
?	March 2008	Serge Guillaume	—	Farmer
March 2008	Incumbent	Jean-Paul Huette	Independent	Farmer

== Notable buildings and places ==
=== National heritage sites ===
Manor a sixteenth century Manor House, located in Sainte-Marie-la-Robert was classified as a Monument historique in 1926.

== See also ==
- Communes of the Orne department
- Parc naturel régional Normandie-Maine
