= Magny-le-Désert =

- Commune
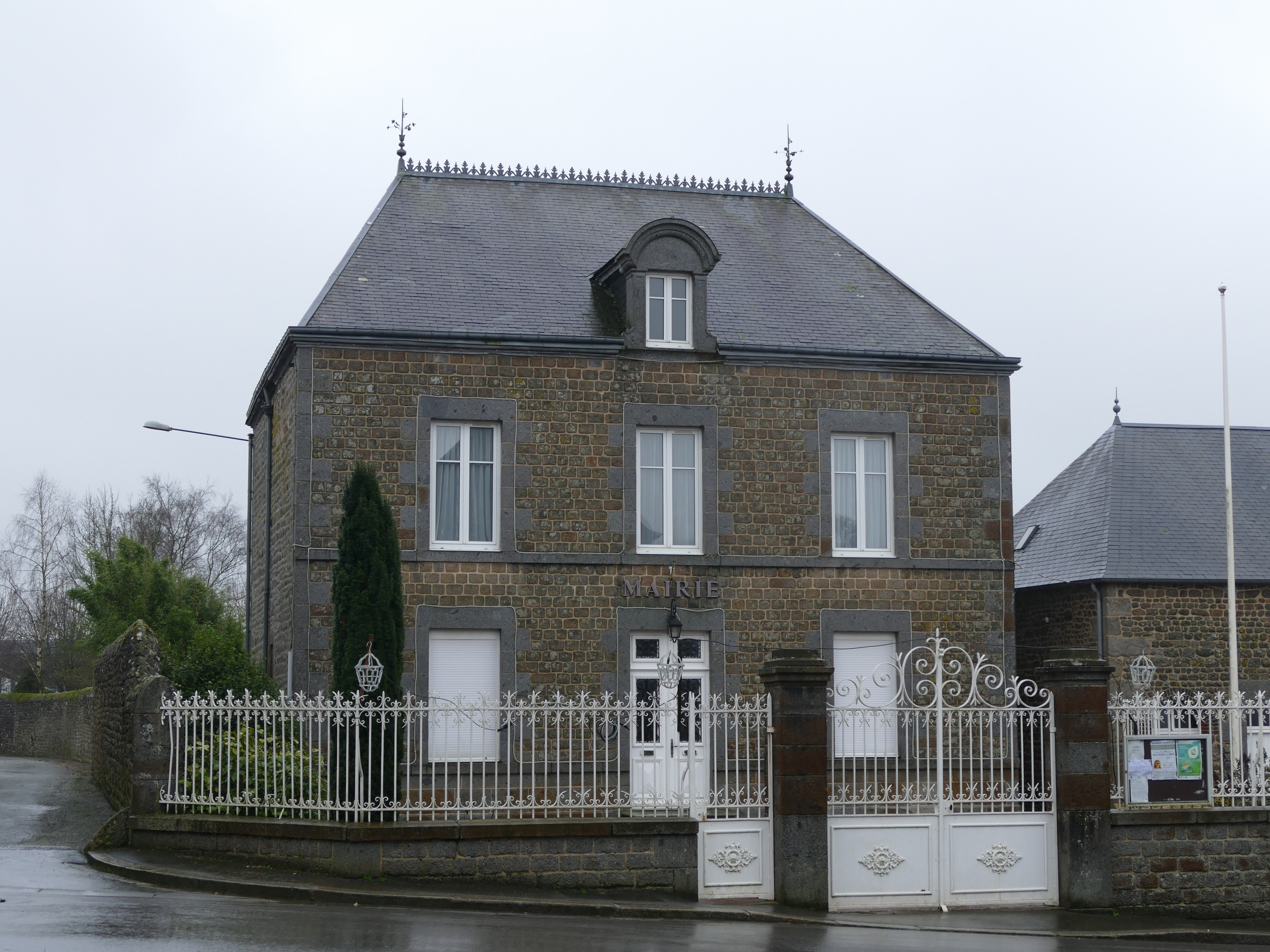
- The town hall in Magny-le-Désert
- Location of Magny-le-Désert
- Location within France Location within Normandy
- Coordinates: 48°34′14″N 0°19′37″W
- Country: France
- Region: Normandy
- Department: Orne
- Arrondissement: Alençon
- Canton: Magny-le-Désert
- Intercommunality: Pays fertois et Bocage carrougien

Government
  - Mayor (2020–2026): Claudine Bellenger
- Area^{1}: 33.34 km^{2} (12.87 sq mi)
- Elevation: 250 m (820 ft)
- Highest elevation: 281 m (922 ft)
- Lowest elevation: 166 m (545 ft)
- Population (2023): 1,391
  - Density: 41.72/km^{2} (108.1/sq mi)
- Time zone: UTC+01:00 (CET)
  - Summer (DST): UTC+02:00 (CEST)
- INSEE/Postal code: 61243 /61600
- ^{1} French Land Register data, which excludes lakes, ponds, glaciers > 1 km^{2} (0.386 sq mi or 247 acres) and river estuaries.

Magny-le-Désert (French pronunciation: [maɲi lə dezɛʁ]) is a commune in the Orne department in north-western France.

== Geography ==
The commune is made up of the following collection of villages and hamlets, La Teinture, Le Bois Gervais, Gourbon, La Basse Retaudière, La Roulerie, La Houssaye, Lannerie, La Perdrière and Magny-le-Désert.

It is 3,330 hectares (12.9 sq mi) in size. The highest point in the commune is 210 metres (690 ft).

The commune is within the Normandie-Maine Regional Natural Park.

The commune has two watercourse flowing through it, The river Gourbe and the Bois Tesselin stream.

== Notable buildings and places ==
=== National heritage sites ===
- Notre-Dame Church 13th century church, that was registered as a Monument historique in 1927.

== See also ==
- Communes of the Orne department
- Parc naturel régional Normandie-Maine
