= François-Benjamin Chaussemiche =

French architect

- Born: June 4, 1864; Tours
- Died: December 13, 1945 (aged 81); Paris
- Education: Beaux-Arts de Paris
- Occupation: Architect

François-Benjamin Chaussemiche (June 4, 1864 – 1945) was a French architect.

Chaussemiche was born in Tours, and in 1883 entered the École des Beaux-Arts where he became a student and later colleague of Victor Laloux. He won the Prix de Rome for architecture in 1893, and served as chief architect of the Palace of Versailles from 1917-1924, during which time he created the Parc botanique de Jussieu (now the Arboretum de Chèvreloup).

== Selected works ==
- 1903 - restoration of the temple of Jupiter Anxur (Terracina, Italy).
- 1904-1904 - Grands Thermes spa of Châtel-Guyon.
- Musée d'Alésia (Alise-Sainte-Reine).
- 1913 - restoration of palaces and gardens of Versailles and the Grand and Petit Trianon.
- 1920 - total reconstruction of châteaux of Monceaux at Méhoudin.
- 1930-1933 - Botanical gallery of the Muséum national d'histoire naturelle in Paris.
