= Chahains =

- Commune
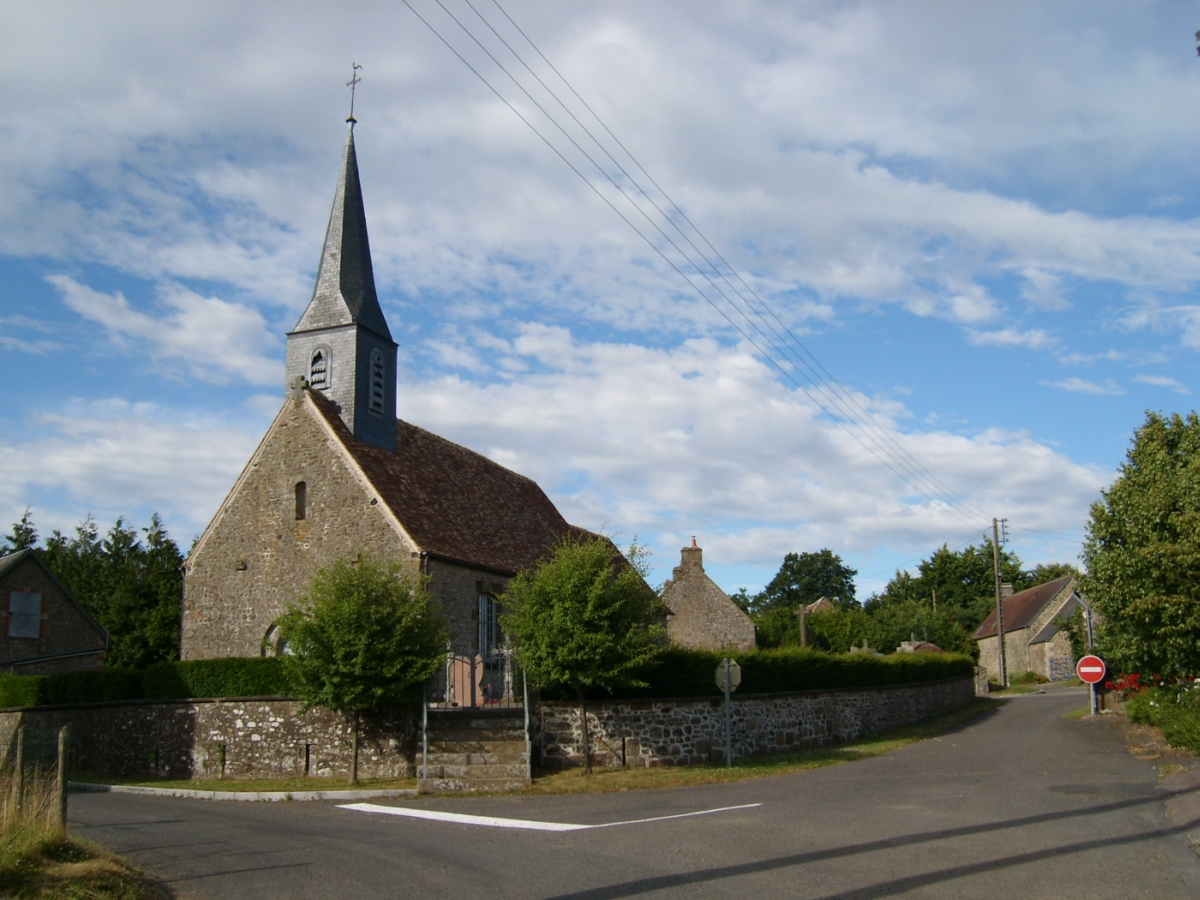
- The church in Chahains
- Location of Chahains
- Location within France Location within Normandy
- Coordinates: 48°33′46″N 0°06′46″W
- Country: France
- Region: Normandy
- Department: Orne
- Arrondissement: Alençon
- Canton: Magny-le-Désert
- Intercommunality: Pays fertois et Bocage carrougien

Government
  - Mayor (2020–2026): Françoise Reig-Hamelin
- Area^{1}: 7.65 km^{2} (2.95 sq mi)
- Elevation: 340 m (1,120 ft)
- Highest elevation: 395 m (1,296 ft)
- Lowest elevation: 271 m (889 ft)
- Population (2023): 81
  - Density: 11/km^{2} (27/sq mi)
- Time zone: UTC+01:00 (CET)
  - Summer (DST): UTC+02:00 (CEST)
- INSEE/Postal code: 61080 /61320
- ^{1} French Land Register data, which excludes lakes, ponds, glaciers > 1 km^{2} (0.386 sq mi or 247 acres) and river estuaries.

Chahains (French pronunciation: [ʃa.ɛ̃]) is a commune in the Orne department in north-western France.

== Geography ==
The commune is made up of the following collection of villages and hamlets, Le Jardin and Chahains.

It is 765 hectares (3.0 sq mi) in size. The highest point in the commune is 395 metres (1,296 ft).

The commune is within the Normandie-Maine Regional Natural Park and Forêt d'Écouves.

The River Udon and 3 streams, the Grand Pied, the Moulin de Besnard and the Coupigny are the four watercourses that flow through this commune. The source of the river Udon is in this commune.

== See also ==
- Communes of the Orne department
- Parc naturel régional Normandie-Maine
