= Joué-du-Plain =

- Commune
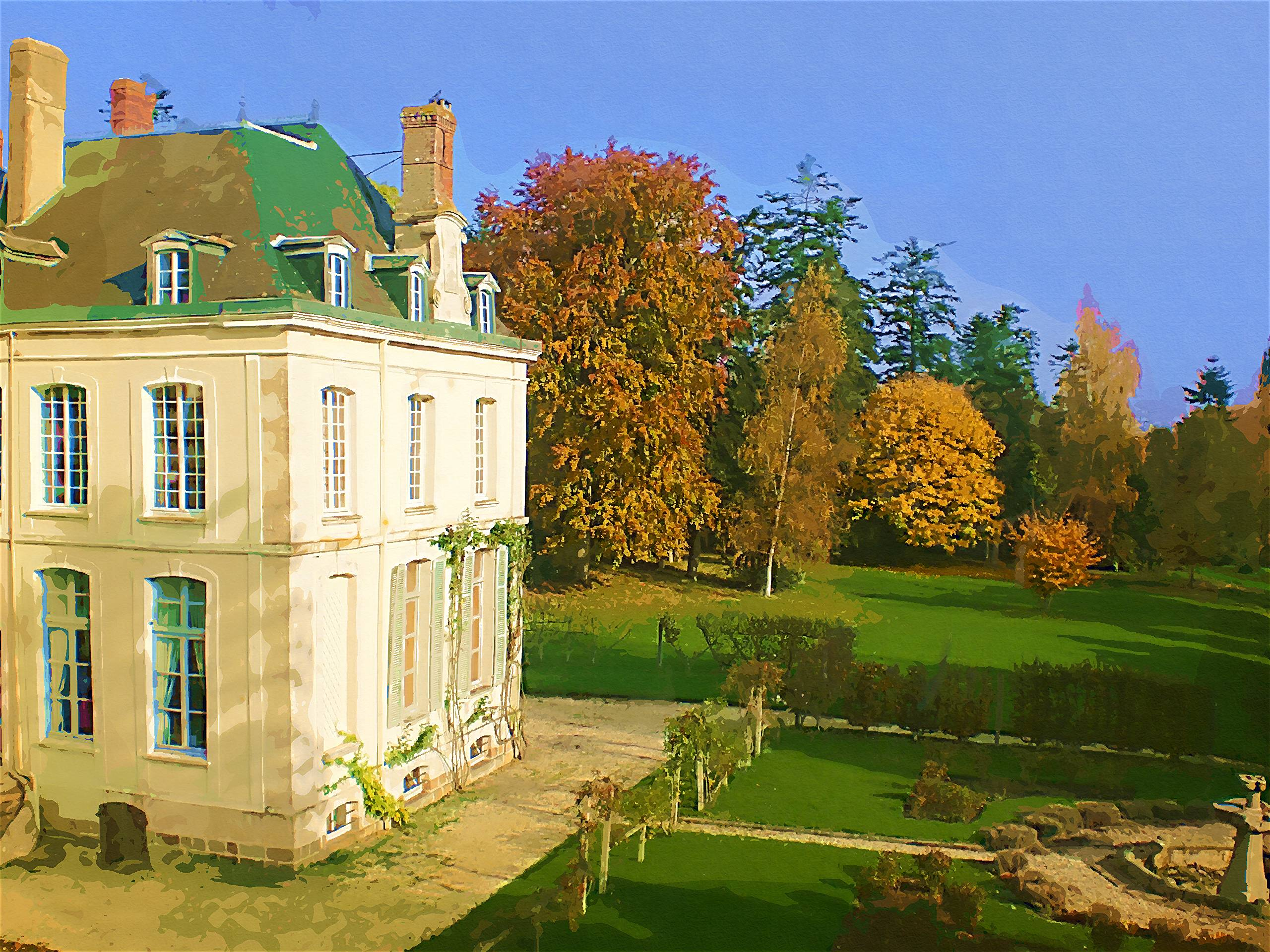
- The chateau in Joué-du-Plain
- Location of Joué-du-Plain
- Location within France Location within Normandy
- Coordinates: 48°41′27″N 0°07′19″W
- Country: France
- Region: Normandy
- Department: Orne
- Arrondissement: Argentan
- Canton: Magny-le-Désert
- Intercommunality: Terres d'Argentan Interco

Government
  - Mayor (2020–2026): Hubert Christophe
- Area^{1}: 14.56 km^{2} (5.62 sq mi)
- Elevation: 170 m (560 ft)
- Highest elevation: 243 m (797 ft)
- Lowest elevation: 149 m (489 ft)
- Population (2023): 233
  - Density: 16.0/km^{2} (41.4/sq mi)
- Time zone: UTC+01:00 (CET)
  - Summer (DST): UTC+02:00 (CEST)
- INSEE/Postal code: 61210 /61150
- ^{1} French Land Register data, which excludes lakes, ponds, glaciers > 1 km^{2} (0.386 sq mi or 247 acres) and river estuaries.

Joué-du-Plain (French pronunciation: [ʒwe dy plɛ̃]) is a commune in the Orne department in north-western France. The commune was mentioned in 1216 by the name of "Jeum". There are 248 people living there. The community festival is 29 June.

== Geography ==
The commune is made up of the following collection of villages and hamlets, Le Ménil Martel,La Rivière, Chantelou, Le Haut Ménil, La Folletière and Joué-du-Plain.

Parts of the commune make up the area, the Plaine d'Argentan, which is known for its cereal growing fields and horse stud farms.

It is 1,456 hectares (5.6 sq mi) in size. The highest point in the commune is 168 metres (551 ft).

Joué-du-Plain along with another 65 communes is part of a 20,593 hectare, Natura 2000 conservation area, called the Haute vallée de l'Orne et affluents.

The River Udon plus two streams the Gosu and the Poncey traverse through the commune.

== Important places ==
The church in the commune is dedicated to Saints Gervais and Portais. The architectural elements are pointed arches, a Norman tower and Roman arches. The church was rebuilt in the Renaissance. Inside the church are sculptures of St. Gervais and Saint Portais made in the 18th century. Also, there is an 18th-century sculpture of Saint Michael made in stone and painted. There are also sculpted wooden stalls, a statue of the Virgin Mary and a baptismal font made in the 18th century. The cemetery around the church has two 16th-century entrances.

Another important place in the commune is Chateau de la Motte. The chateau is a 19th-century building.

== Legends ==
Joué-du-Plain has a legend that the lord of Chantelou killed his wife and her lover. The lord painted the front of his chateau with their blood. The farm called Baritaur is the former place of the lord called "Red House of Chante-lou"

== See also ==
- Communes of the Orne department
- Château de la Motte, Joué du Plain
