= Saint-Martin-l'Aiguillon =

- Commune
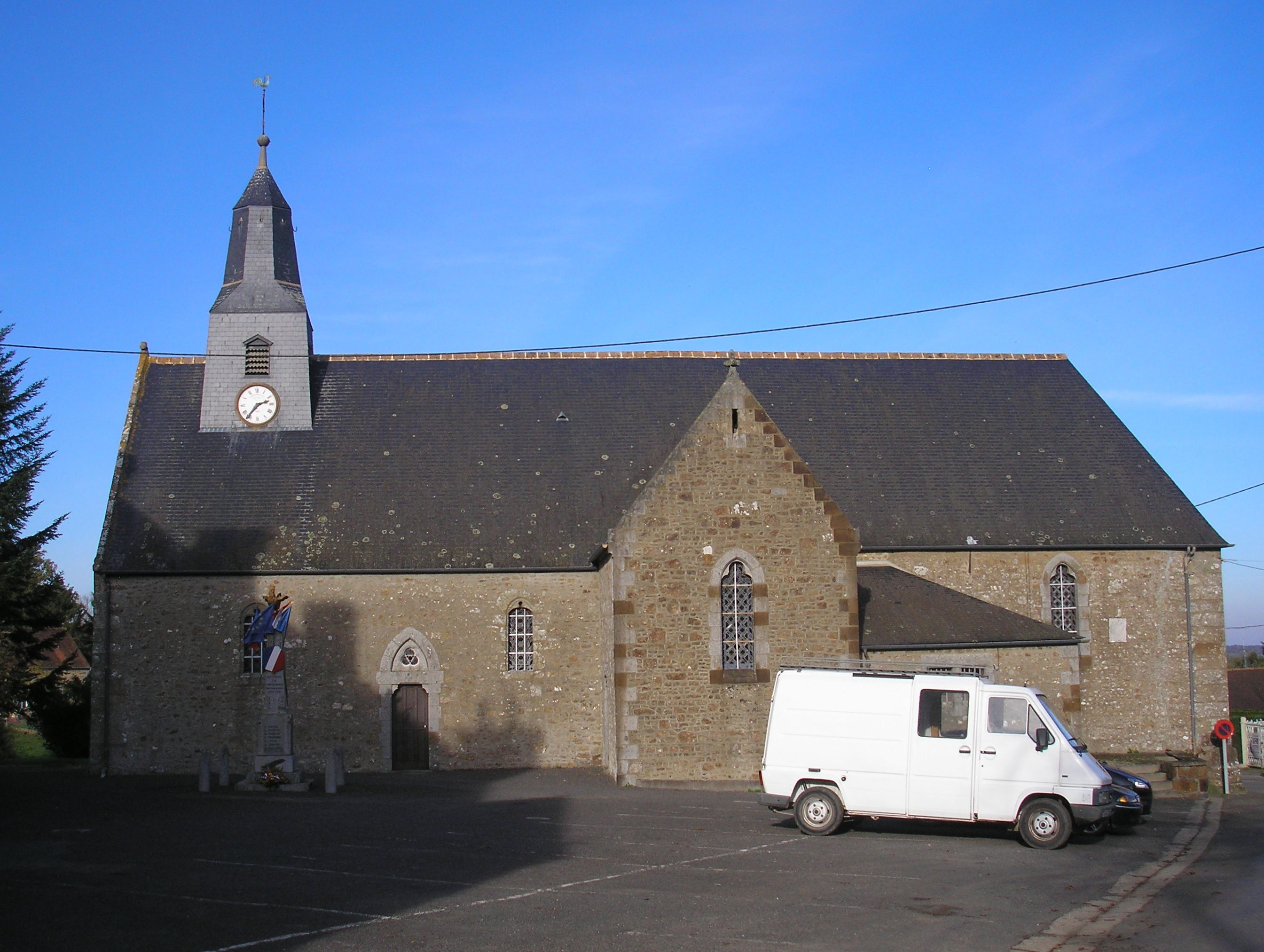
- The church in Saint-Martin-l'Aiguillon
- Location of Saint-Martin-l'Aiguillon
- Location within France Location within Normandy
- Coordinates: 48°37′01″N 0°10′28″W
- Country: France
- Region: Normandy
- Department: Orne
- Arrondissement: Alençon
- Canton: Magny-le-Désert

Government
  - Mayor (2020–2026): Valérie Chesnel
- Area^{1}: 14.61 km^{2} (5.64 sq mi)
- Elevation: 225 m (738 ft)
- Highest elevation: 324 m (1,063 ft)
- Lowest elevation: 190 m (620 ft)
- Population (2023): 186
  - Density: 12.7/km^{2} (33.0/sq mi)
- Time zone: UTC+01:00 (CET)
  - Summer (DST): UTC+02:00 (CEST)
- INSEE/Postal code: 61427 /61320
- ^{1} French Land Register data, which excludes lakes, ponds, glaciers > 1 km^{2} (0.386 sq mi or 247 acres) and river estuaries.

Saint-Martin-l'Aiguillon (French pronunciation: [sɛ̃ maʁtɛ̃ lɛɡɥijɔ̃]) is a commune in the Orne department in north-western France.

== Geography ==
The commune is made up of the following collection of villages and hamlets, La Grande Fichetière, Le Beauchêne, Pré de la Fosse and Saint-Martin-l'Aiguillon.

It is 1,460 hectares (5.6 sq mi) in size. The highest point in the commune is 234 metres (768 ft).

The commune is within the Normandie-Maine Regional Natural Park.

Saint-Martin-l'Aiguillon along with another 65 communes is part of a 20,593 hectare, Natura 2000 conservation area, called the Haute vallée de l'Orne et affluents.

The commune has one river, The Udon flowing through it, plus three streams, The Noes Morins, the Rouvray and the Rohan.

== See also ==
- Communes of the Orne department
- Parc naturel régional Normandie-Maine
