= Saint-Patrice-du-Désert =

- Commune
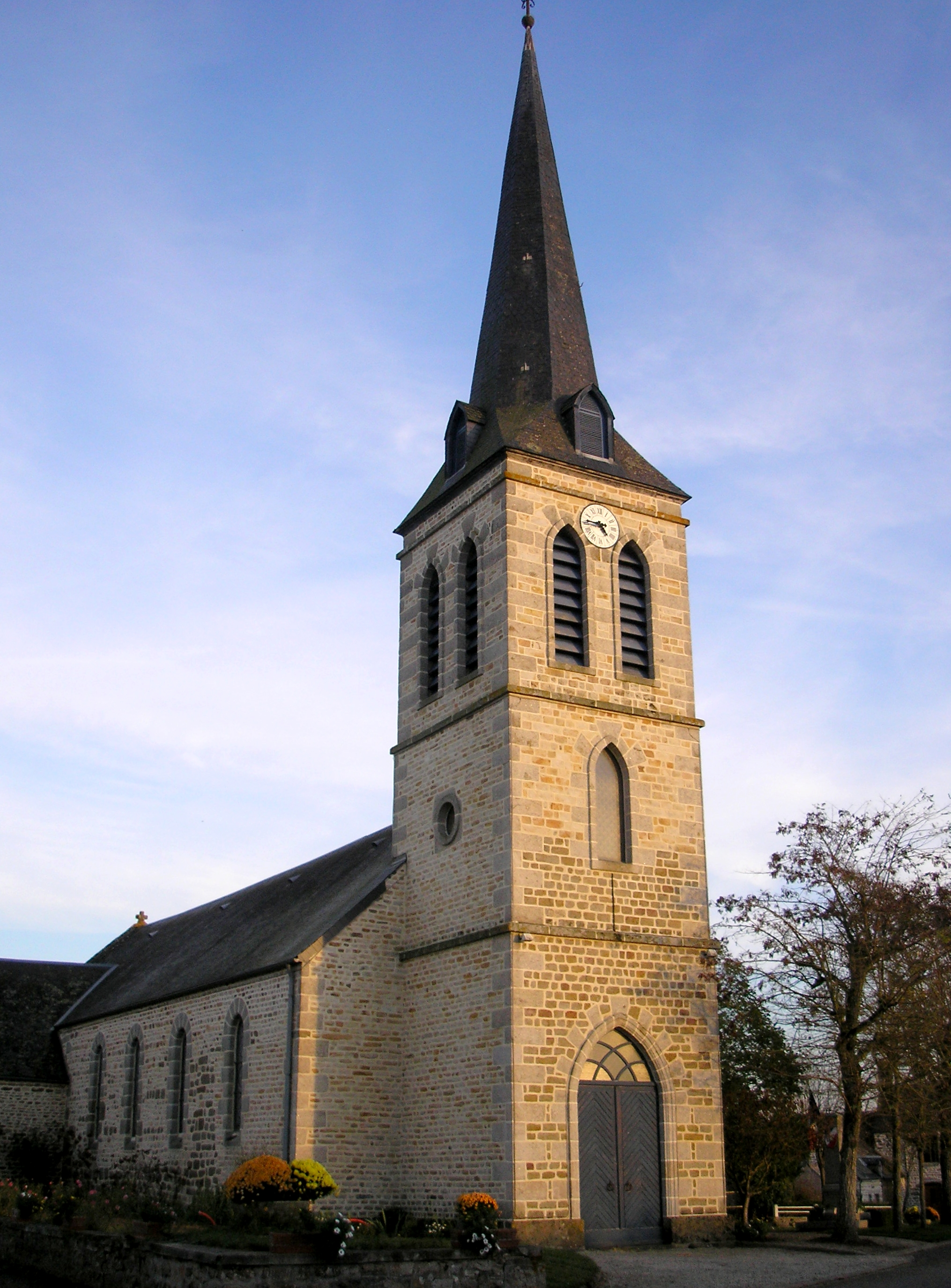
- The church in Saint-Patrice-du-Désert
- Location of Saint-Patrice-du-Désert
- Location within France Location within Normandy
- Coordinates: 48°32′34″N 0°18′02″W
- Country: France
- Region: Normandy
- Department: Orne
- Arrondissement: Alençon
- Canton: Magny-le-Désert
- Intercommunality: Pays fertois et Bocage carrougien

Government
  - Mayor (2020–2026): Raymond Esnault
- Area^{1}: 20.48 km^{2} (7.91 sq mi)
- Elevation: 210 m (690 ft)
- Highest elevation: 268 m (879 ft)
- Lowest elevation: 168 m (551 ft)
- Population (2023): 237
  - Density: 11.6/km^{2} (30.0/sq mi)
- Time zone: UTC+01:00 (CET)
  - Summer (DST): UTC+02:00 (CEST)
- INSEE/Postal code: 61442 /61600
- ^{1} French Land Register data, which excludes lakes, ponds, glaciers > 1 km^{2} (0.386 sq mi or 247 acres) and river estuaries.

Saint-Patrice-du-Désert (French pronunciation: [sɛ̃ patʁis dy dezɛʁ]) is a commune in the Orne department in north-western France.

== Geography ==
The commune is located within the Normandie-Maine Regional Natural Park.

The commune is made up of the following collection of villages and hamlets, Le Bois Haumont, Le Tertre, Saint-Patrice-du-Désert, Le Greffier, Le Petit Jard and L'Hermitage.

== Points of interest ==
=== National heritage sites ===
- Château du Petit-Jard' a nineteenth century chateau, it was registered as a Monument historique in 2005.

== See also ==
- Communes of the Orne department
- Parc naturel régional Normandie-Maine
