= Lougé-sur-Maire =

- Commune
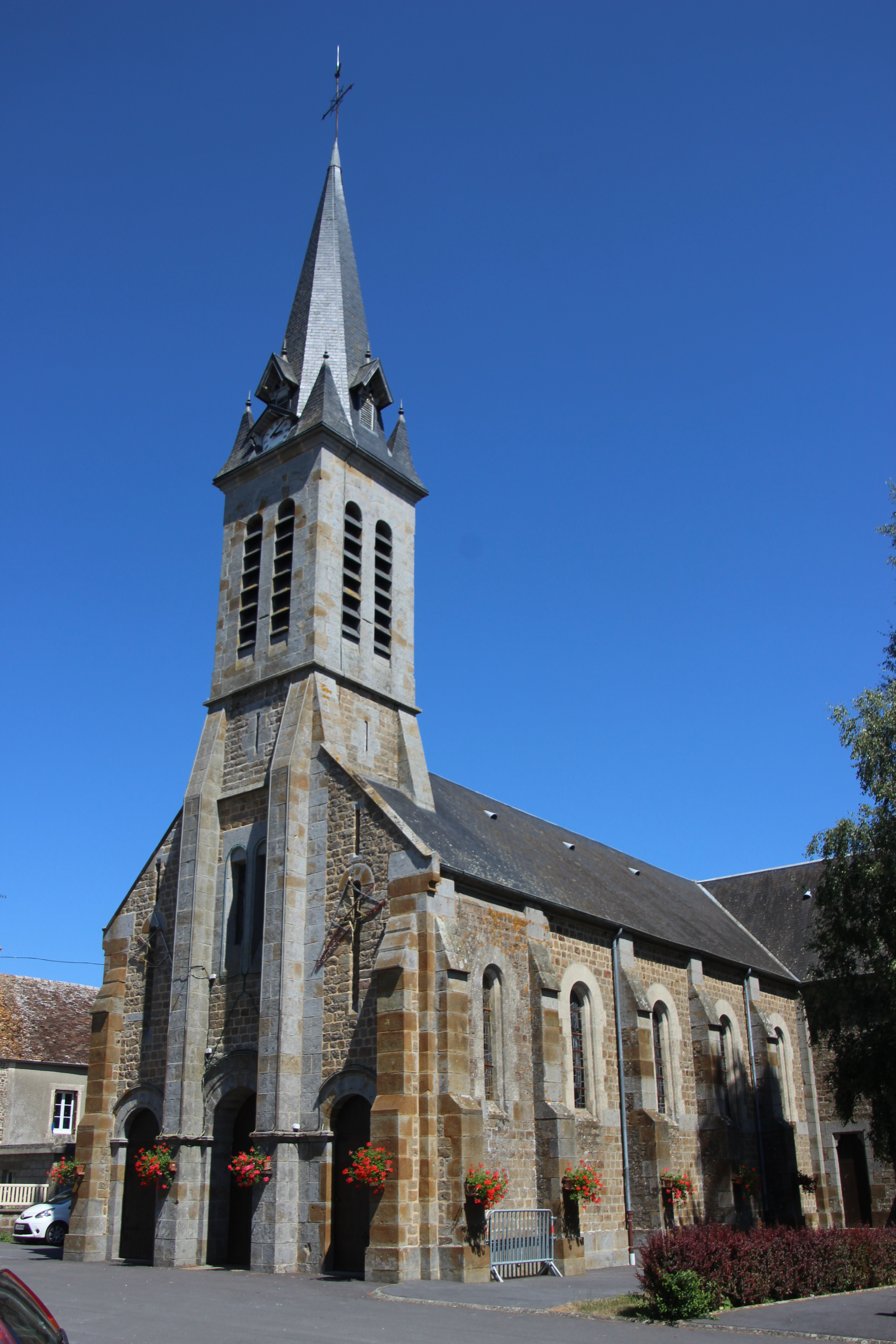
- Location of Lougé-sur-Maire
- Location within France Location within Normandy
- Coordinates: 48°41′39″N 0°13′27″W
- Country: France
- Region: Normandy
- Department: Orne
- Arrondissement: Argentan
- Canton: Magny-le-Désert
- Intercommunality: Terres d'Argentan Interco

Government
  - Mayor (2020–2026): Elodie Jacq
- Area^{1}: 13.58 km^{2} (5.24 sq mi)
- Elevation: 220 m (720 ft)
- Highest elevation: 246 m (807 ft)
- Lowest elevation: 157 m (515 ft)
- Population (2023): 312
  - Density: 23.0/km^{2} (59.5/sq mi)
- Time zone: UTC+01:00 (CET)
  - Summer (DST): UTC+02:00 (CEST)
- INSEE/Postal code: 61237 /61150
- ^{1} French Land Register data, which excludes lakes, ponds, glaciers > 1 km^{2} (0.386 sq mi or 247 acres) and river estuaries.

Lougé-sur-Maire (French pronunciation: [luʒe syʁ mɛʁ]) is a commune in the Orne department in north-western France.

== Geography ==
The commune is made up of the following collection of villages and hamlets, Le Vaux Bougon,Milhard, La Métairie, La Huttière and Lougé-sur-Maire.

Lougé-sur-Maire, along with another 65 communes, is part of a 20,593 hectare, Natura 2000 conservation area, called the Haute vallée de l'Orne et affluents.

There are 6 watercourses that traverse through the commune, the River Maire, Aunais stream, Vallees Stream, Chalau Stream, Gue Blandin stream and la Barbottiere stream.

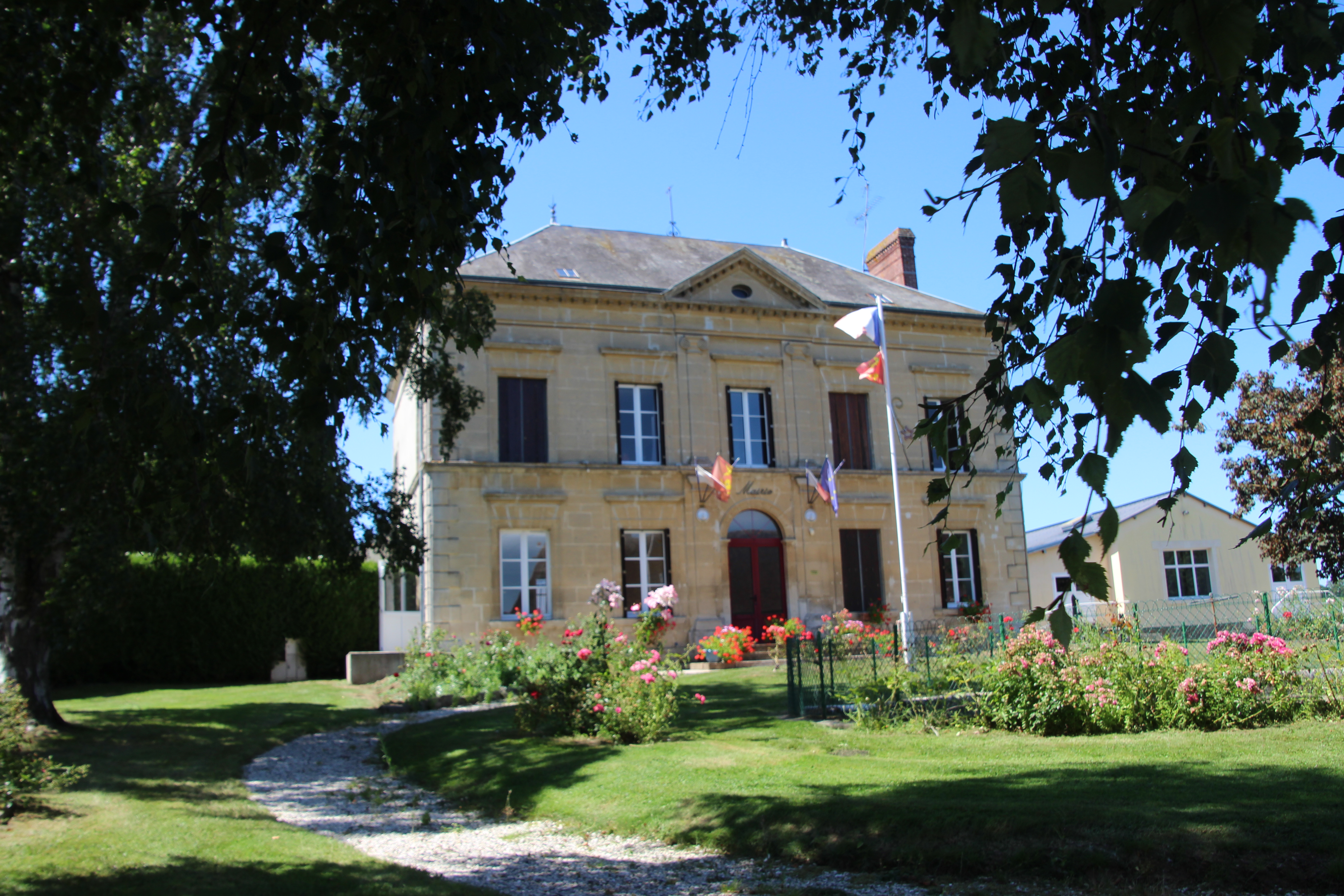
Mairie Lougé-sur-Maire (2)

== See also ==
- Communes of the Orne department
