= Joué-du-Bois =

- Commune
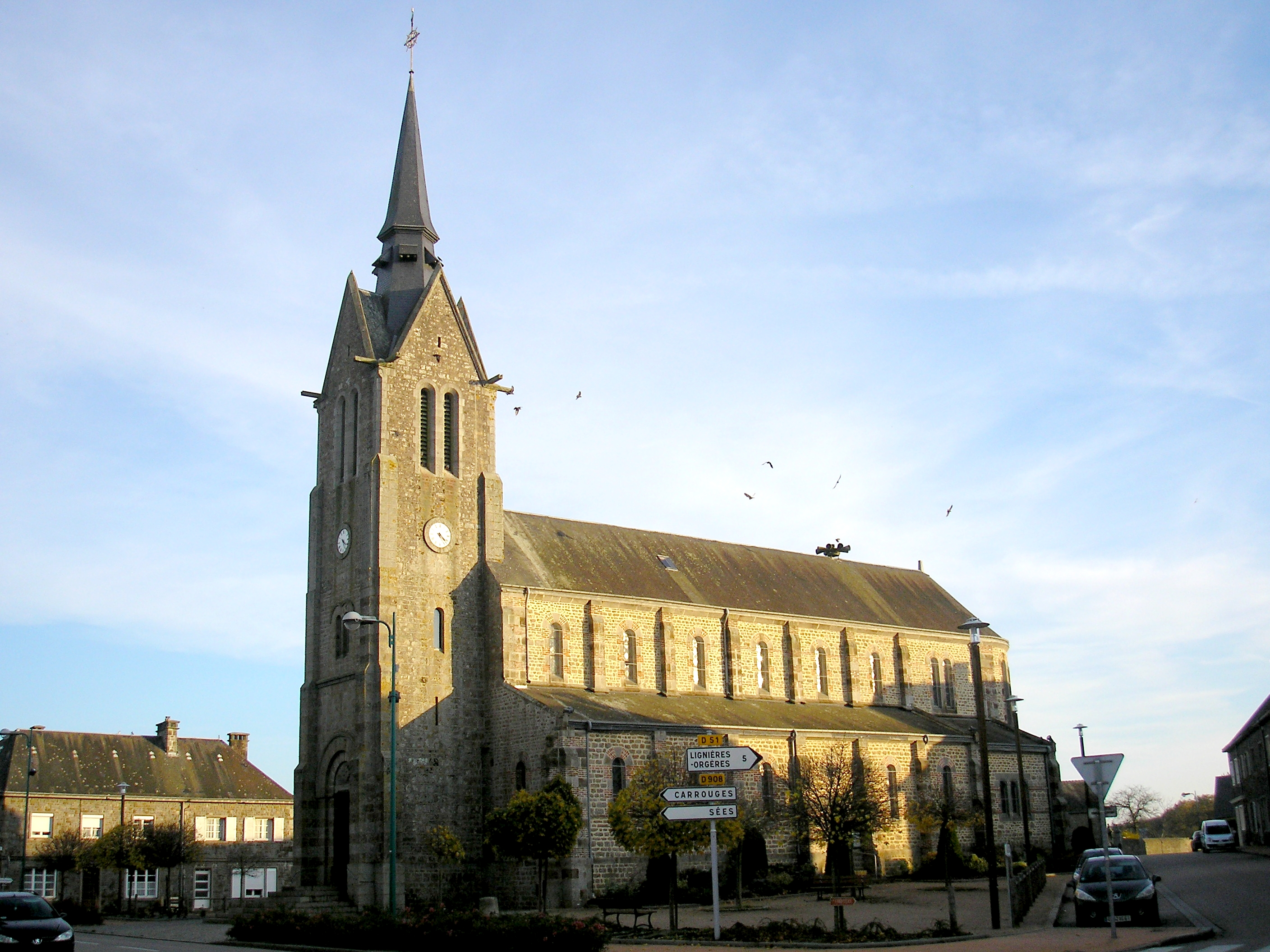
- The church in Joué-du-Bois

- Coat of arms
- Location of Joué-du-Bois
- Location within France Location within Normandy
- Coordinates: 48°34′57″N 0°13′51″W
- Country: France
- Region: Normandy
- Department: Orne
- Arrondissement: Alençon
- Canton: Magny-le-Désert
- Intercommunality: Pays fertois et Bocage carrougien

Government
  - Mayor (2020–2026): Pierre Correyeur
- Area^{1}: 21.08 km^{2} (8.14 sq mi)
- Highest elevation: 344 m (1,129 ft)
- Lowest elevation: 213 m (699 ft)
- Population (2023): 382
  - Density: 18.1/km^{2} (46.9/sq mi)
- Demonym: Gaudiacéens
- Time zone: UTC+01:00 (CET)
  - Summer (DST): UTC+02:00 (CEST)
- INSEE/Postal code: 61209 /61320
- ^{1} French Land Register data, which excludes lakes, ponds, glaciers > 1 km^{2} (0.386 sq mi or 247 acres) and river estuaries.

Joué-du-Bois (French pronunciation: [ʒwe dy bwa]) is a commune in the Orne department in north-western France.

== Geography ==
The commune is made up of the following collection of villages and hamlets, La Raitière, Le Hamel, La Retourdière, La Brousse, Le Theil, La Vallée, La Fontenelle and Joué-du-Bois.

It is 2,110 hectares (8.1 sq mi) in size. The highest point in the commune is 304 metres (997 ft).

The commune is within the Normandie-Maine Regional Natural Park.

Joué-du-Bois along with another 65 communes is part of a 20,593 hectare, Natura 2000 conservation area, called the Haute vallée de l'Orne et affluents.

The commune has one river, The Gourbe flowing through it, plus two streams, The Noes Morins and the Bois Tesselin.

== Notable buildings and places ==
=== National heritage sites ===
The Commune has four buildings and areas listed as a Monument historique.

- Joué-du-Bois Manor is a 15th-century Manor house, declared as a monument in 1991.
- la Grandière Dolmen is a Neolithic Dolmen, registered as a monument in 1889.
- The Wolf Stone Dolmen is a Neolithic Dolmen, registered as a monument in 1889.
- The Outres Menhir is a Neolithic Menhir, registered as a monument in 1889.

== See also ==
- Communes of the Orne department
- Parc naturel régional Normandie-Maine
