= Sevrai =

- Commune
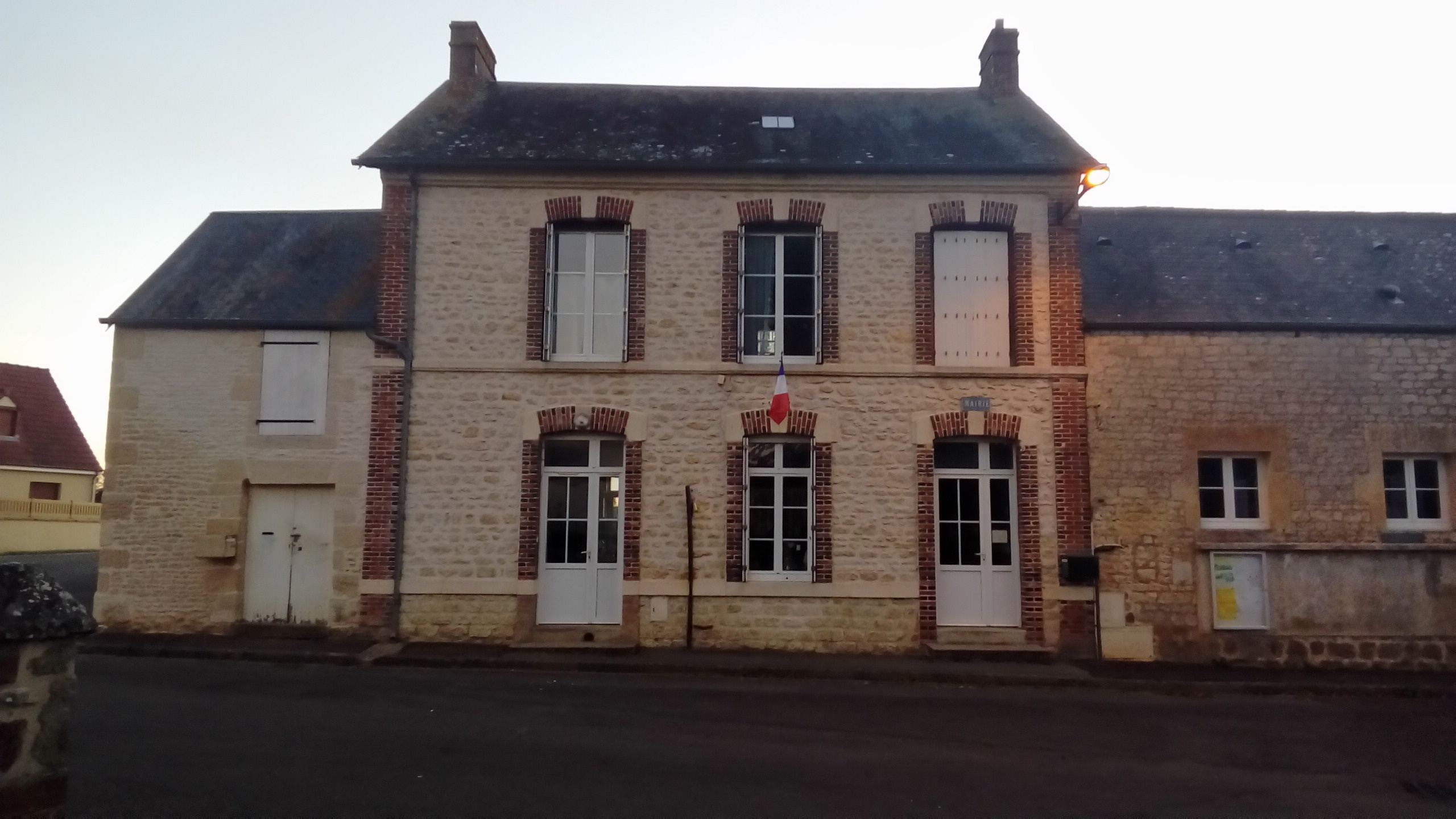
- The town hall in Sevrai
- Location of Sevrai
- Location within France Location within Normandy
- Coordinates: 48°42′17″N 0°08′15″W
- Country: France
- Region: Normandy
- Department: Orne
- Arrondissement: Argentan
- Canton: Magny-le-Désert
- Intercommunality: Terres d'Argentan Interco

Government
  - Mayor (2020–2026): Jean-Marie Bisson
- Area^{1}: 8.11 km^{2} (3.13 sq mi)
- Elevation: 150 m (490 ft)
- Highest elevation: 205 m (673 ft)
- Lowest elevation: 147 m (482 ft)
- Population (2023): 292
  - Density: 36.0/km^{2} (93.3/sq mi)
- Time zone: UTC+01:00 (CET)
  - Summer (DST): UTC+02:00 (CEST)
- INSEE/Postal code: 61473 /61150
- ^{1} French Land Register data, which excludes lakes, ponds, glaciers > 1 km^{2} (0.386 sq mi or 247 acres) and river estuaries.

Sevrai (French pronunciation: [səvʁɛ]) is a commune in the Orne department in north-western France.

== Geography ==
The commune is made up of the following collection of villages and hamlets, Udon,Ferrière and Sevrai.

Parts of the commune make up the area, the Plaine d'Argentan, which is known for its cereal growing fileds and horse stud farms.

Sevrai along with another 65 communes is part of a 20,593 hectare, Natura 2000 conservation area, called the Haute vallée de l'Orne et affluents.

There are 5 watercourses that traverse through the commune, the Orne, Maire, Udon, Gosu stream and Poncey stream.

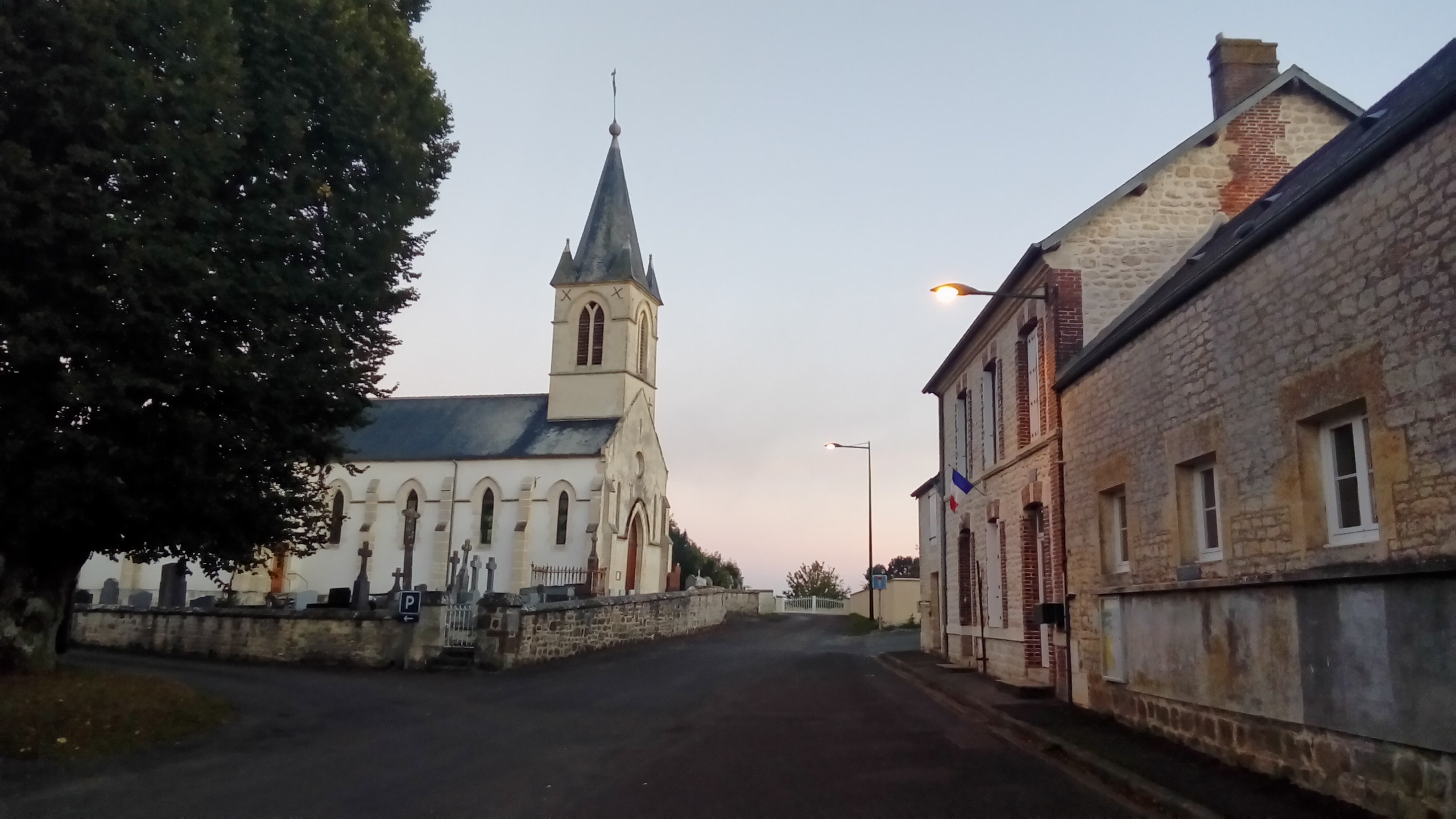
Sevrai

== See also ==
- Communes of the Orne department
- Château de la Motte, Joué du Plain
