= Udon (river) =

- Location within France Location within Normandy

Location
- Country: France

Physical characteristics
- Source
  - location: Chahains, Orne
- Mouth: Orne
  - coordinates: 48°33′47″N 0°07′40″W
- Length: 28.24 km (17.55 mi)

Basin features
- Progression: Orne→ English Channel

The Udon (French pronunciation: [ydɔ̃]) is a river in northwestern France, crossing the department of the Orne. It is 28.24 km long. Its source is in Chahains, and it flows into the river Orne on the border of the communes of Écouché-les-Vallées and Sevrai.

The river flows through the area known as the Plaine d'Argentan.

== Tributaries ==
The three biggest tributaries for the Udon are:

1. Ruisseau du Moulin de Besnard (13 km long)
2. Le Couillard (11 km long)
3. La Ranette (7 km long)

== Communes ==
The Udon passes through the following Communes:

1. Chahains
2. Carrouges
3. Sainte-Marguerite-de-Carrouges
4. Sainte-Marie-la-Robert
5. Vieux-Pont
6. Saint-Martin-des-Landes
7. Joué-du-Plain
8. Saint-Martin-l'Aiguillon
9. Sevrai
10. Écouché-les-Vallées
