= Le Champ-de-la-Pierre =

- Commune
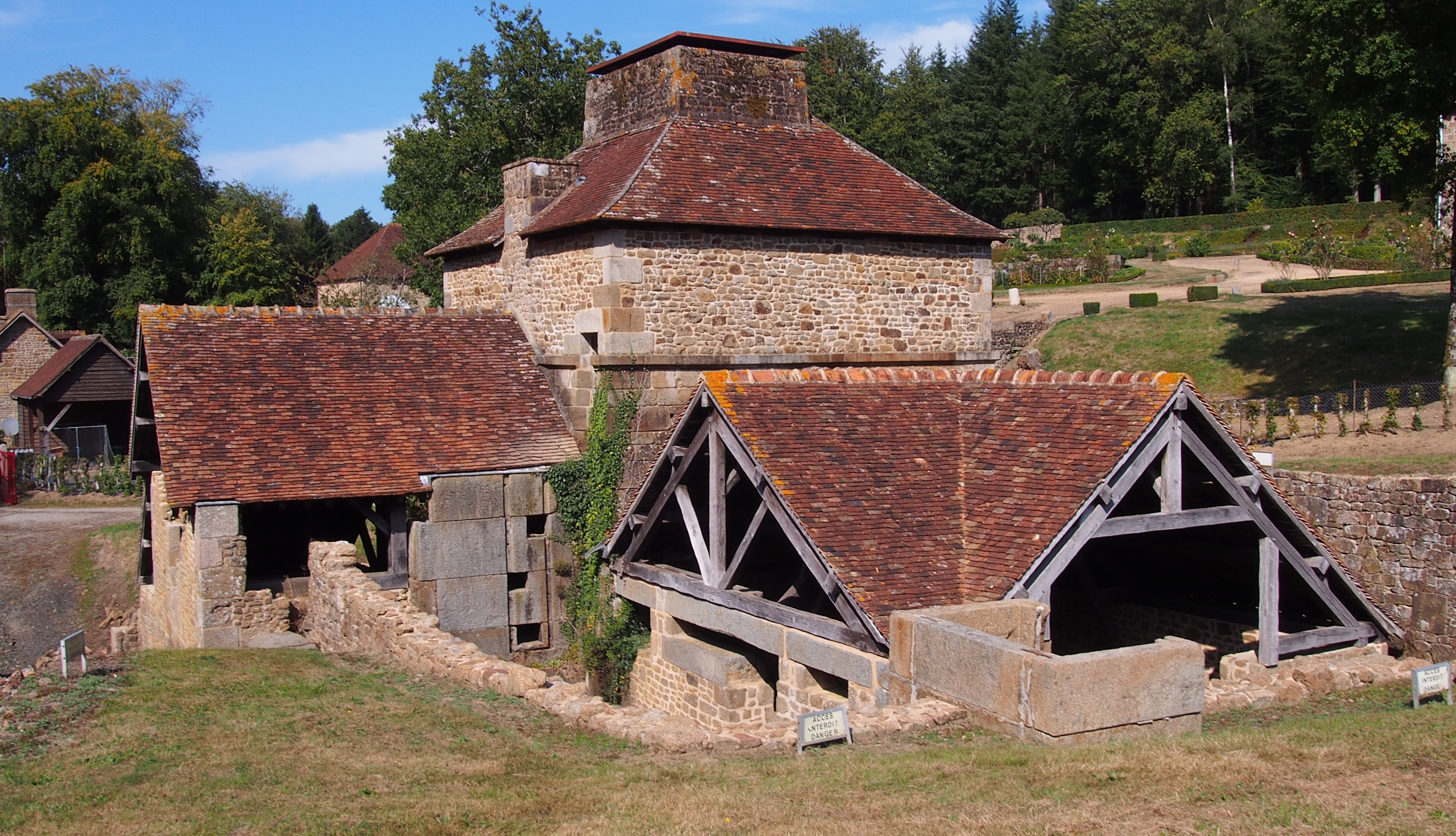
- Location of Le Champ-de-la-Pierre
- Location within France Location within Normandy
- Coordinates: 48°36′34″N 0°12′15″W
- Country: France
- Region: Normandy
- Department: Orne
- Arrondissement: Alençon
- Canton: Magny-le-Désert
- Intercommunality: Pays fertois et Bocage carrougien

Government
  - Mayor (2020–2026): Jeanne-Marie Boudet
- Area^{1}: 4.05 km^{2} (1.56 sq mi)
- Highest elevation: 315 m (1,033 ft)
- Lowest elevation: 238 m (781 ft)
- Population (2023): 28
  - Density: 6.9/km^{2} (18/sq mi)
- Time zone: UTC+01:00 (CET)
  - Summer (DST): UTC+02:00 (CEST)
- INSEE/Postal code: 61085 /61320
- ^{1} French Land Register data, which excludes lakes, ponds, glaciers > 1 km^{2} (0.386 sq mi or 247 acres) and river estuaries.

Le Champ-de-la-Pierre (French pronunciation: [lə ʃɑ̃ də la pjɛʁ]) is a commune in the Orne department in north-western France.

== Geography ==
The Commune is 410 hectares (1.6 sq mi) in size. The highest point in the commune is 271 metres (889 ft).

The commune is within the Normandie-Maine Regional Natural Park.

Le Champ-de-la-Pierre along with another 65 communes is part of a 20,593 hectare, Natura 2000 conservation area, called the Haute vallée de l'Orne et affluents.

== Notable buildings and places ==
=== National heritage sites ===
The Commune has 2 buildings and areas listed as a Monument historique

Forge master's house is a ruin of a 17th-century building. It was classified as a monument in 1991.

Domaine du Champ de la Pierre is a 14th-century chateau with extensive gardens, was classed as a Monument historique in 1993. The gardens are a Pre-romantic park from the end of the 18th century open to the public, featuring a Maze. The gardens were classified as a Jardins remarquables by the Ministry of Culture and the Comité des Parcs et Jardins de France in 2006.

== See also ==
- Communes of the Orne department
- Parc naturel régional Normandie-Maine
