= Le Ménil-Scelleur =

- Commune
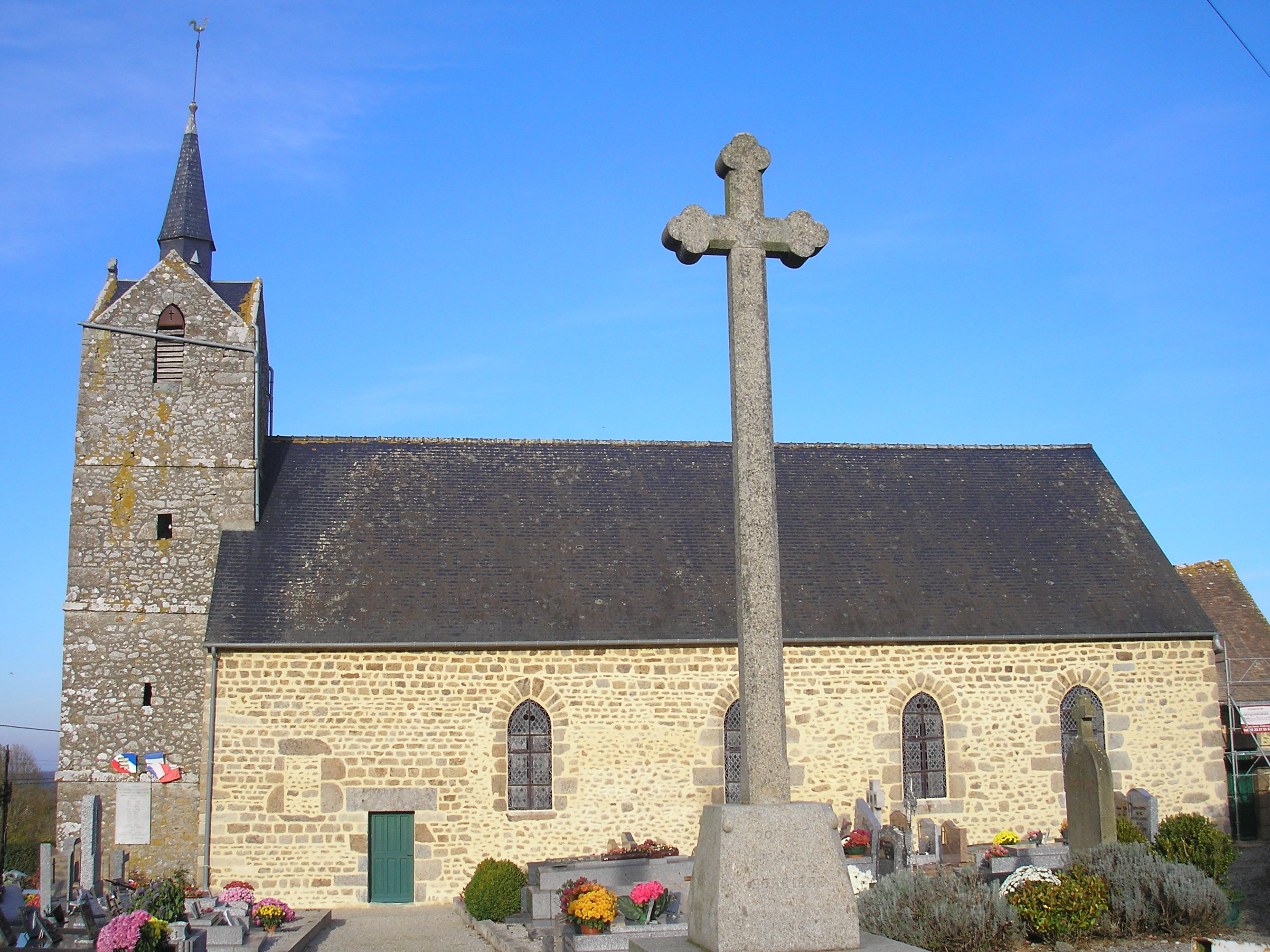
- The church in Le Ménil-Scelleur
- Location of Le Ménil-Scelleur
- Location within France Location within Normandy
- Coordinates: 48°36′40″N 0°07′09″W
- Country: France
- Region: Normandy
- Department: Orne
- Arrondissement: Alençon
- Canton: Magny-le-Désert
- Intercommunality: Pays fertois et Bocage carrougien

Government
  - Mayor (2020–2026): Dominique Ripaux
- Area^{1}: 5.37 km^{2} (2.07 sq mi)
- Elevation: 235 m (771 ft)
- Highest elevation: 289 m (948 ft)
- Lowest elevation: 194 m (636 ft)
- Population (2023): 92
  - Density: 17/km^{2} (44/sq mi)
- Time zone: UTC+01:00 (CET)
  - Summer (DST): UTC+02:00 (CEST)
- INSEE/Postal code: 61271 /61320
- ^{1} French Land Register data, which excludes lakes, ponds, glaciers > 1 km^{2} (0.386 sq mi or 247 acres) and river estuaries.

Le Ménil-Scelleur (French pronunciation: [lə menil sɛlœʁ]) is a commune in the Orne department in north-western France.

== Geography ==
The commune is made up of the following collection of villages and hamlets, Danny and Le Ménil-Scelleur.

It is 540 hectares (2.1 sq mi) in size. The highest point in the commune is 241 metres (791 ft).

The commune is within the Normandie-Maine Regional Natural Park and Forêt d'Écouves.

Le Ménil-Scelleur along with another 65 communes is part of a 20,593 hectare, Natura 2000 conservation area, called the Haute vallée de l'Orne et affluents.

Three streams, the Gue de la Heze, the Moulin de Besnard and the Coupigny are the three watercourses that flow through this commune.

== See also ==
- Communes of the Orne department
- Parc naturel régional Normandie-Maine
