= Canton of Magny-le-Désert =

Coordinates: 48.57°N 0.33°W

The canton of Magny-le-Désert is an administrative division of the Orne department, northwestern France. It was created at the French canton reorganisation which came into effect in March 2015. Its seat is in Magny-le-Désert.

It consists of the following communes:

1. Avoine
2. Boucé
3. Carrouges
4. Chahains
5. Le Champ-de-la-Pierre
6. La Chaux
7. Ciral
8. Écouché-les-Vallées
9. Fleuré
10. Joué-du-Bois
11. Joué-du-Plain
12. La Lande-de-Goult
13. La Lande-de-Lougé
14. Lougé-sur-Maire
15. Magny-le-Désert
16. Méhoudin
17. Le Ménil-Scelleur
18. Monts-sur-Orne
19. La Motte-Fouquet
20. L'Orée-d'Écouves
21. Rânes
22. Rouperroux
23. Saint-Brice-sous-Rânes
24. Saint-Ellier-les-Bois
25. Sainte-Marguerite-de-Carrouges
26. Sainte-Marie-la-Robert
27. Saint-Georges-d'Annebecq
28. Saint-Martin-des-Landes
29. Saint-Martin-l'Aiguillon
30. Saint-Ouen-le-Brisoult
31. Saint-Patrice-du-Désert
32. Saint-Sauveur-de-Carrouges
33. Sevrai
34. Tanques
35. Vieux-Pont
