= Saint-Ouen-le-Brisoult =

- Commune
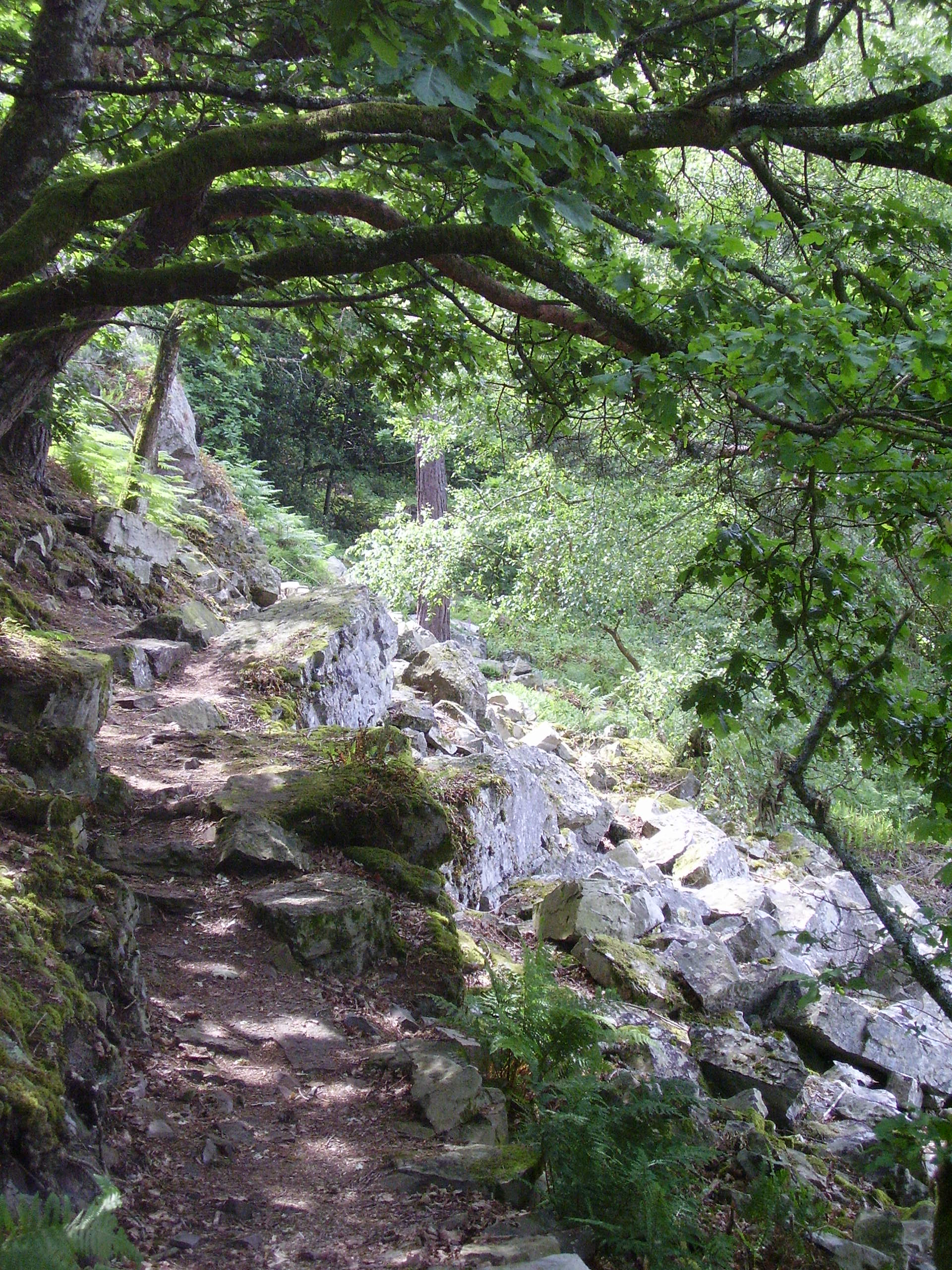
- Villiers Gorge
- Location of Saint-Ouen-le-Brisoult
- Location within France Location within Normandy
- Coordinates: 48°30′39″N 0°20′19″W
- Country: France
- Region: Normandy
- Department: Orne
- Arrondissement: Alençon
- Canton: Magny-le-Désert

Government
  - Mayor (2020–2026): Yvette Laîné
- Area^{1}: 9.75 km^{2} (3.76 sq mi)
- Elevation: 200 m (660 ft)
- Highest elevation: 221 m (725 ft)
- Lowest elevation: 124 m (407 ft)
- Population (2023): 128
  - Density: 13.1/km^{2} (34.0/sq mi)
- Time zone: UTC+01:00 (CET)
  - Summer (DST): UTC+02:00 (CEST)
- INSEE/Postal code: 61439 /61410
- ^{1} French Land Register data, which excludes lakes, ponds, glaciers > 1 km^{2} (0.386 sq mi or 247 acres) and river estuaries.

Saint-Ouen-le-Brisoult (French pronunciation: [sɛ̃.t‿wɛ̃ lə bʁizu]) is a commune in the Orne department in north-western France.

The inhabitants are known as Audoniens and Audoniennes.

== Geography ==
The commune is made up of the following collection of villages and hamlets, Les Haies, La Frogerie and Saint-Ouen-le-Brisoult.

The commune is located within the Normandie-Maine Regional Natural Park.

The river Mayenne flows through the commune.

== Demographics ==
Historical population
Year	Pop.	±% p.a.
1968	172	—
1975	138	−3.10%
1982	125	−1.40%
1990	121	−0.41%
1999	105	−1.56%
2007	138	+3.48%
2012	128	−1.49%
2017	123	−0.79%
2023	128	+0.67%
Source: INSEE

== See also ==
- Communes of the Orne department
- Parc naturel régional Normandie-Maine
