= Saint-Martin-des-Landes =

- Commune
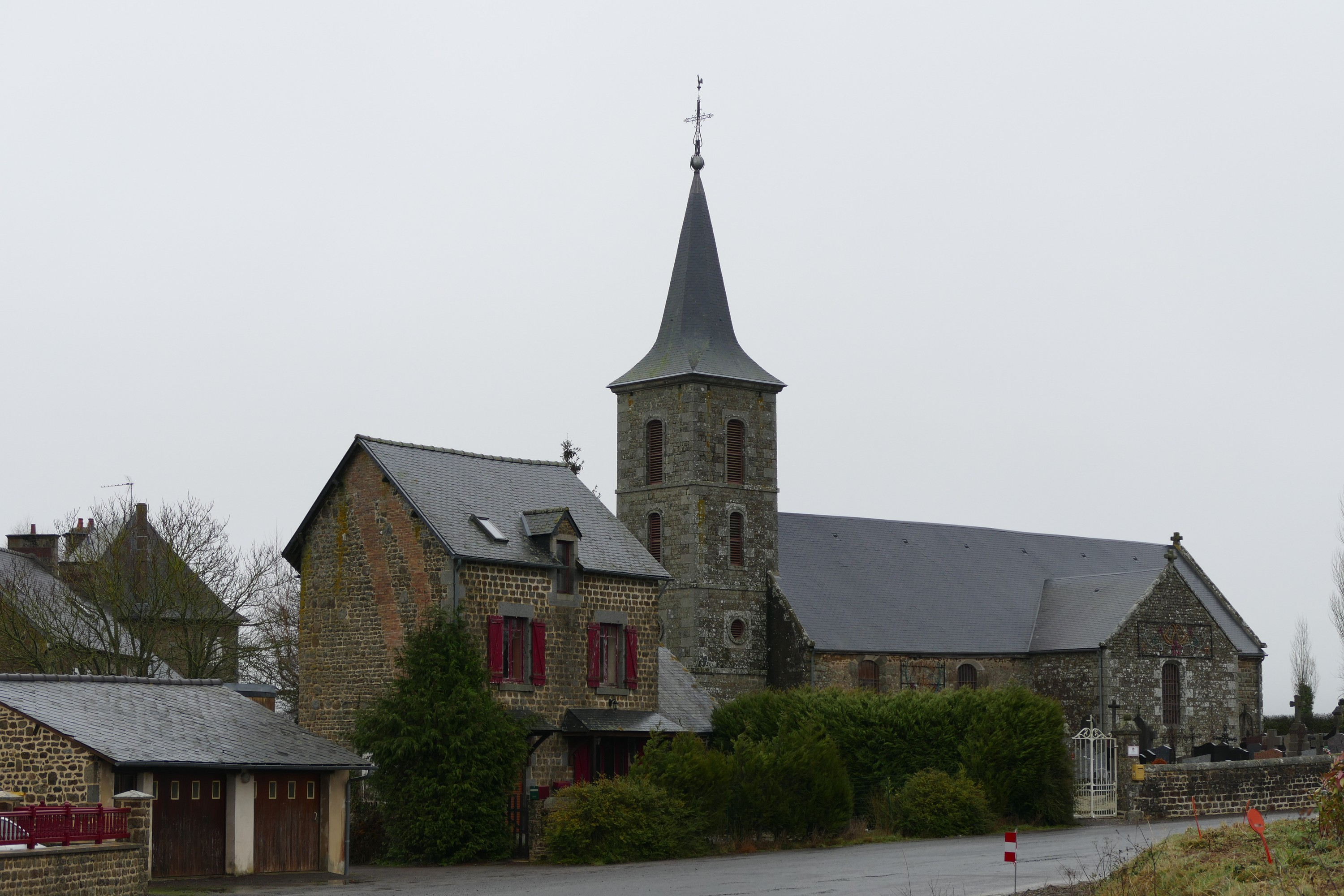
- The church in Saint-Martin-des-Landes
- Location of Saint-Martin-des-Landes
- Location within France Location within Normandy
- Coordinates: 48°32′49″N 0°08′11″W
- Country: France
- Region: Normandy
- Department: Orne
- Arrondissement: Alençon
- Canton: Magny-le-Désert
- Intercommunality: Pays fertois et Bocage carrougien

Government
  - Mayor (2020–2026): Maryse Oliveira
- Area^{1}: 11.19 km^{2} (4.32 sq mi)
- Elevation: 298 m (978 ft)
- Highest elevation: 372 m (1,220 ft)
- Lowest elevation: 263 m (863 ft)
- Population (2023): 184
  - Density: 16.4/km^{2} (42.6/sq mi)
- Time zone: UTC+01:00 (CET)
  - Summer (DST): UTC+02:00 (CEST)
- INSEE/Postal code: 61424 /61320
- ^{1} French Land Register data, which excludes lakes, ponds, glaciers > 1 km^{2} (0.386 sq mi or 247 acres) and river estuaries.

Saint-Martin-des-Landes (French pronunciation: [sɛ̃ maʁtɛ̃ de lɑ̃d]) is a commune in the Orne department in north-western France.

== Geography ==
Saint-Martin-des-Landes along with another 65 communes is part of a 20,593 hectare, Natura 2000 conservation area, called the Haute vallée de l'Orne et affluents.

The river Udon flows through the commune.

The commune is in the Normandie-Maine Regional Natural Park.

== See also ==
- Communes of the Orne department
- Parc naturel régional Normandie-Maine
