= La Chaux, Orne =

La Chaux
- Commune
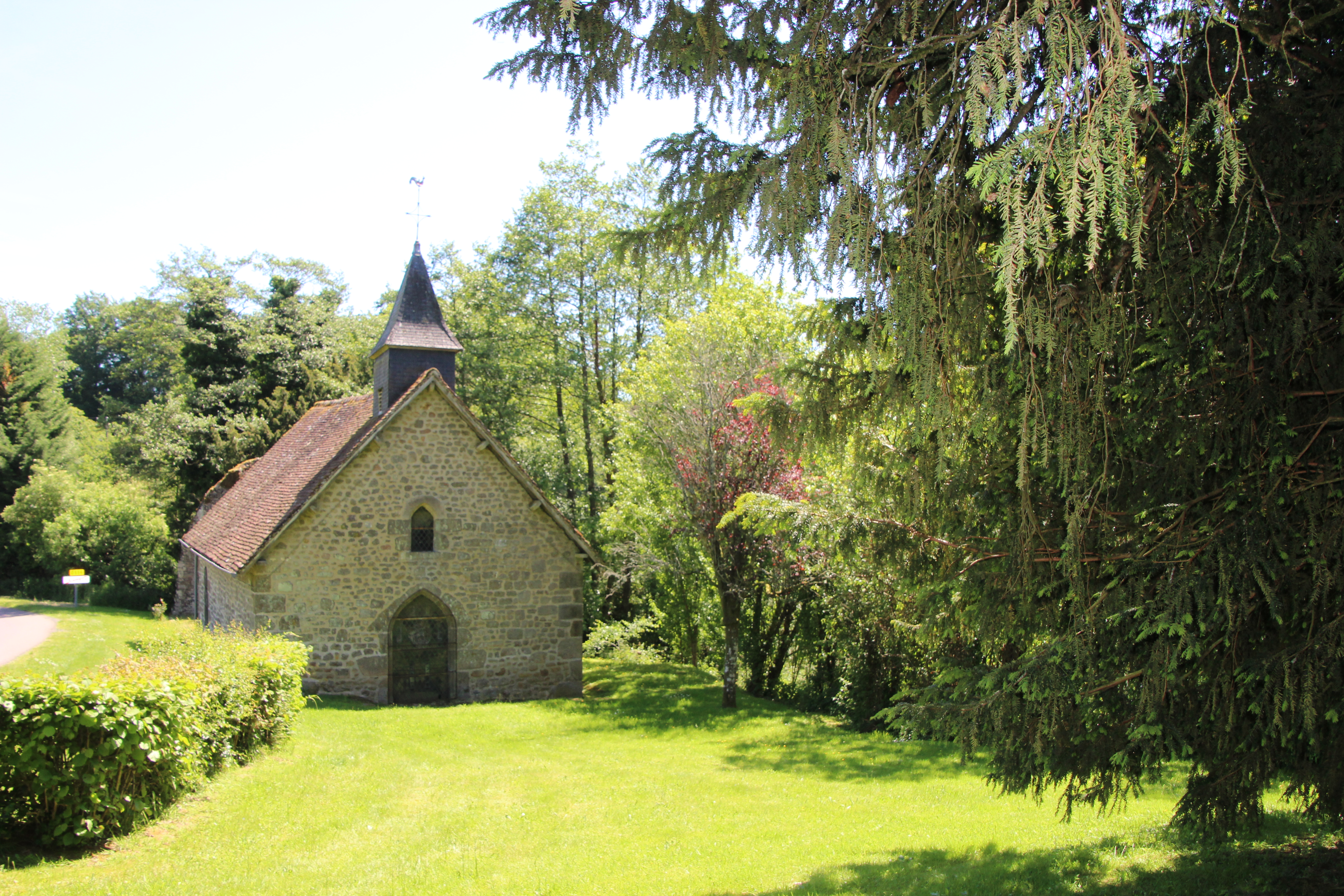
- Location of La Chaux
- Location within France Location within Normandy
- Coordinates: 48°36′41″N 0°15′23″W
- Country: France
- Region: Normandy
- Department: Orne
- Arrondissement: Alençon
- Canton: Magny-le-Désert
- Intercommunality: Pays fertois et Bocage carrougien

Government
  - Mayor (2020–2026): Michel Paucton
- Area^{1}: 5.06 km^{2} (1.95 sq mi)
- Highest elevation: 306 m (1,004 ft)
- Lowest elevation: 213 m (699 ft)
- Population (2023): 53
  - Density: 10/km^{2} (27/sq mi)
- Demonym: Caldéens
- Time zone: UTC+01:00 (CET)
  - Summer (DST): UTC+02:00 (CEST)
- INSEE/Postal code: 61104 /61600
- ^{1} French Land Register data, which excludes lakes, ponds, glaciers > 1 km^{2} (0.386 sq mi or 247 acres) and river estuaries.

La Chaux (French pronunciation: [la ʃo]) is a commune in the Orne department in north-western France.

== Geography ==
It is 510 hectares (2.0 sq mi) in size. The highest point in the commune is 262 metres (860 ft).

The commune is within the Normandie-Maine Regional Natural Park.

The commune has one river, The Gourbe flowing through it, and the Bois Tesselin stream.

== See also ==
- Communes of the Orne department
- Parc naturel régional Normandie-Maine
