= Méhoudin =

- Commune
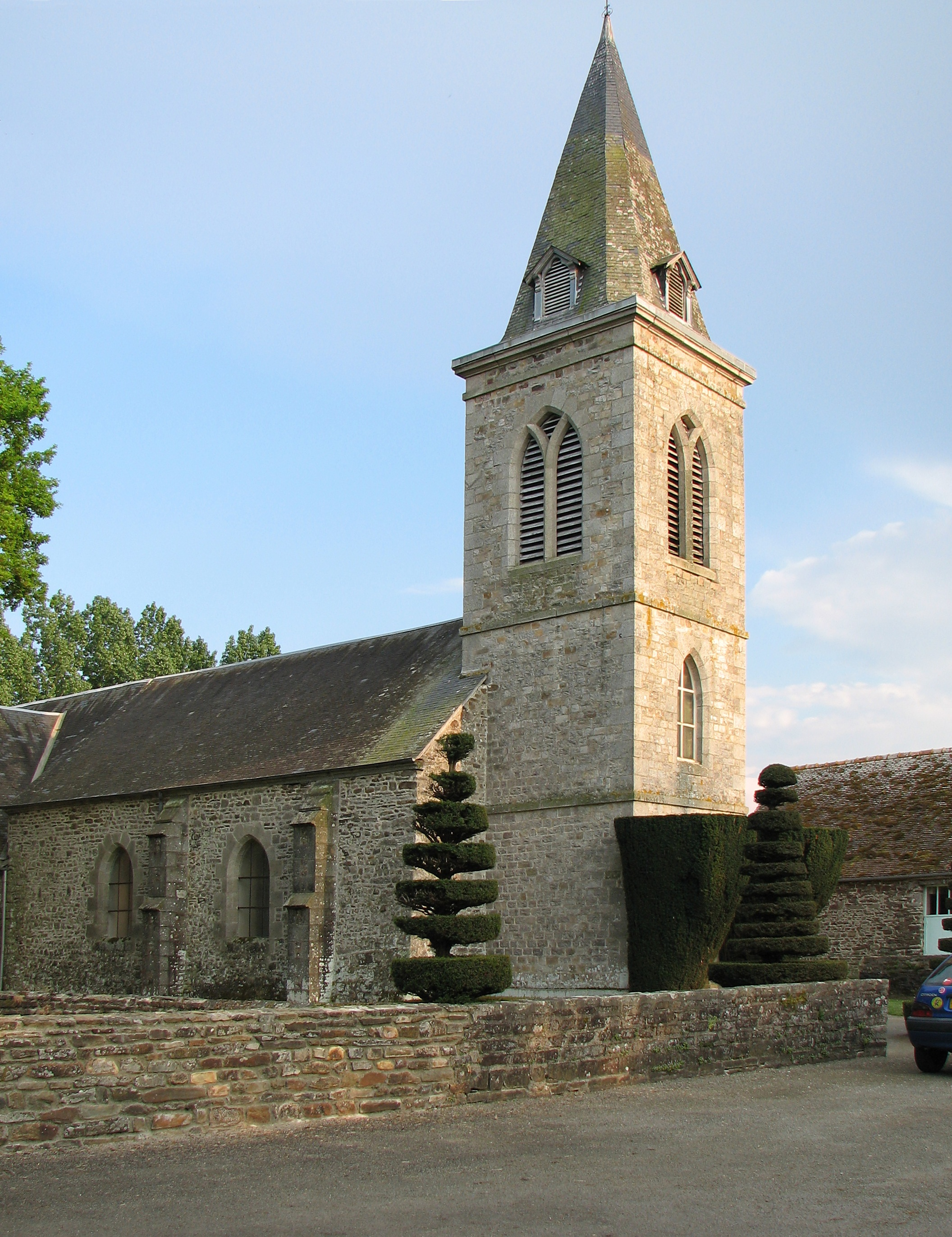
- Church at Méhoudin
- Location of Méhoudin
- Location within France Location within Normandy
- Coordinates: 48°30′06″N 0°23′00″W
- Country: France
- Region: Normandy
- Department: Orne
- Arrondissement: Alençon
- Canton: Magny-le-Désert
- Intercommunality: Pays fertois et Bocage carrougien

Government
  - Mayor (2020–2026): Claude Ferouelle
- Area^{1}: 3.85 km^{2} (1.49 sq mi)
- Elevation: 127 m (417 ft)
- Highest elevation: 184 m (604 ft)
- Lowest elevation: 122 m (400 ft)
- Population (2023): 121
  - Density: 31.4/km^{2} (81.4/sq mi)
- Time zone: UTC+01:00 (CET)
  - Summer (DST): UTC+02:00 (CEST)
- INSEE/Postal code: 61257 /61410
- ^{1} French Land Register data, which excludes lakes, ponds, glaciers > 1 km^{2} (0.386 sq mi or 247 acres) and river estuaries.

Méhoudin (French pronunciation: [meudɛ̃]) is a commune in the Orne department in north-western France.

== Geography ==
The commune is made up of the following collection of villages and hamlets, La Chevallerie, Le Bois and Méhoudin.

The commune is located within the Normandie-Maine Regional Natural Park.

The river Mayenne flows through the commune.

== Points of interest ==
=== National heritage sites ===
- Domaine de Monceaux originally an eighteenth century Manor house, that was completely rebuilt identically, but with a concrete reinforced frame, in 1920 by architect François-Benjamin Chaussemiche, it was registered as a Monument historique in 1993.

== See also ==
- Communes of the Orne department
- Parc naturel régional Normandie-Maine
