= Haute vallée de l'Orne et affluents =

Protected area in France

Haute vallée de l'Orne et affluents translated as the Upper Orne Valley and tributaries is a Natura 2000 conservation area that is 20,593 hectares in size. The site is managed by CPIE Collines normandes.

== Geography ==
The area is focused on the sources of the Orne and its main tributaries up to Putanges-Pont-Ecrepin, the area that is prone to flooding and has water all year round.

It is spread across 66 different communes all within the Orne department;

1. Almenêches
2. Argentan
3. Aunou-le-Faucon
4. Aunou-sur-Orne
5. Avoine
6. Belfonds
7. Boischampré
8. Boissei-la-Lande
9. Boucé
10. Brullemail
11. Carrouges
12. Le Cercueil
13. Chailloué
14. Le Champ-de-la-Pierre
15. La Chapelle-près-Sées
16. Le Château-d'Almenêches
17. Commeaux
18. Écouché-les-Vallées
19. Faverolles
20. La Ferrière-Béchet
21. Ferrières-la-Verrerie
22. Fleuré
23. Francheville
24. Giel-Courteilles
25. Gouffern en Auge
26. Gâprée
27. Habloville
28. Joué-du-Bois
29. Joué-du-Plain
30. Juvigny-sur-Orne
31. La Lande-de-Goult
32. La Lande-de-Lougé
33. Lougé-sur-Maire
34. Macé
35. Médavy
36. Le Ménil-Scelleur
37. Merlerault-le-Pin
38. Montabard
39. Montmerrei
40. Montreuil-au-Houlme
41. Monts-sur-Orne
42. Mortrée
43. Moulins-sur-Orne
44. Occagnes
45. Putanges-le-Lac
46. Ri
47. Rânes
48. Sai
49. Saint-Brice-sous-Rânes
50. Saint-Germain-le-Vieux
51. Saint-Hilaire-de-Briouze
52. Saint-Léonard-des-Parcs
53. Saint-Martin-des-Landes
54. Saint-Martin-l'Aiguillon
55. Saint-Sauveur-de-Carrouges
56. Sainte-Marguerite-de-Carrouges
57. Sainte-Marie-la-Robert
58. Sarceaux
59. Sevrai
60. Sées
61. Sévigny
62. Tanques
63. Tanville
64. Trémont
65. Vieux-Pont
66. Les Yveteaux

Some parts of this Natura 2000 site are within the Normandie-Maine Regional Natural Park and the area known as Suisse Normande.

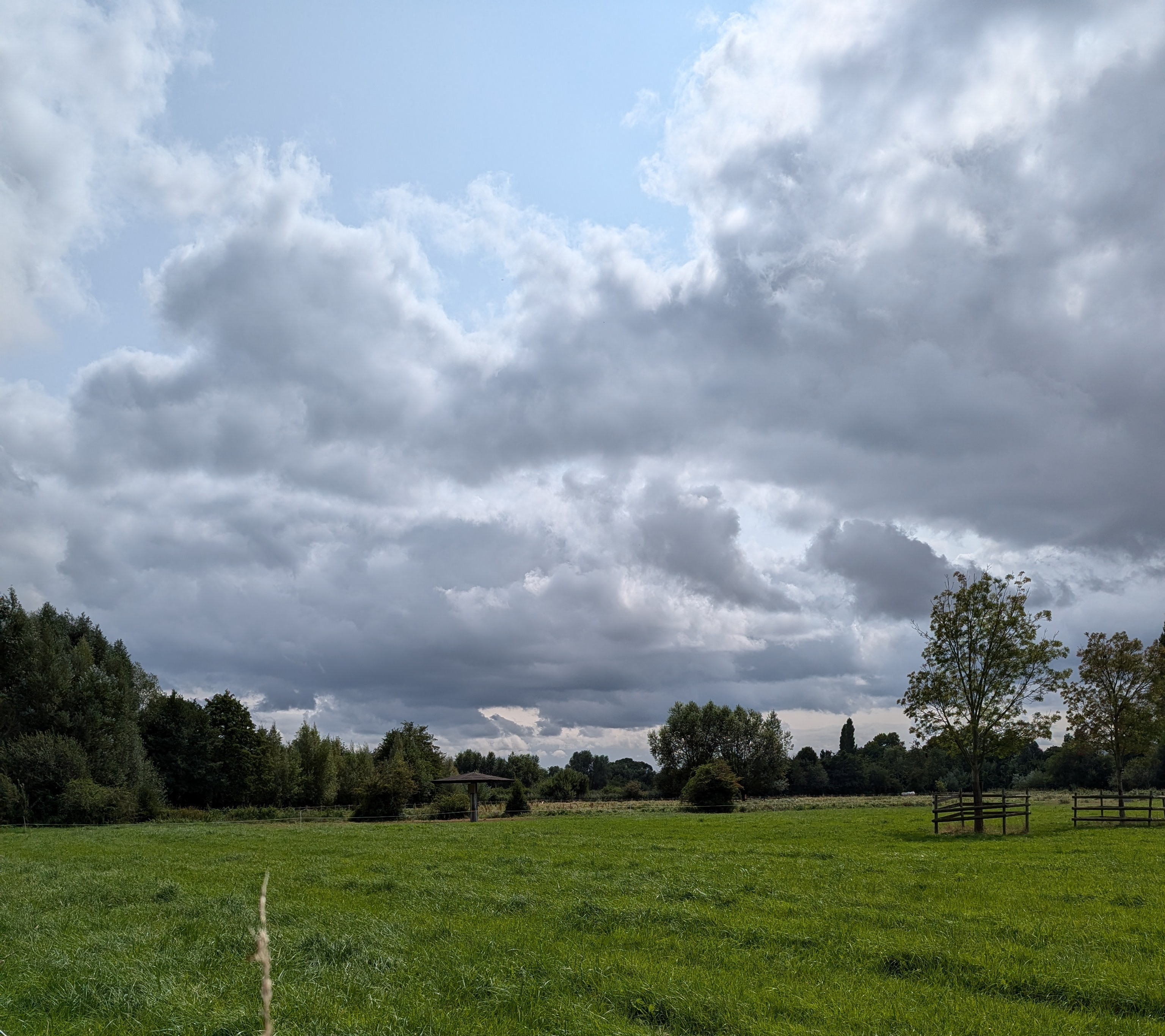
Les Pátures d'Argentan part of the greater Natura 2000 site Haute vallée de l'Orne et affluents

== Conservation ==
The conservation area has thirteen species listed in Annex 2 of the Habitats Directive;

1. Eurasian otter
2. European bullhead
3. Cottus perifretum
4. Brook lamprey
5. White-clawed crayfish
6. Jersey tiger
7. Marsh fritillary
8. European stag beetle
9. Northern crested newt
10. Southern damselfly
11. Orange-spotted emerald
12. Thick shelled river mussel
13. Desmoulin's whorl snail

In addition the Natura 2000 site has 19 habitats protected under the Habitats Directive.
