= La Lande-de-Lougé =

- Commune
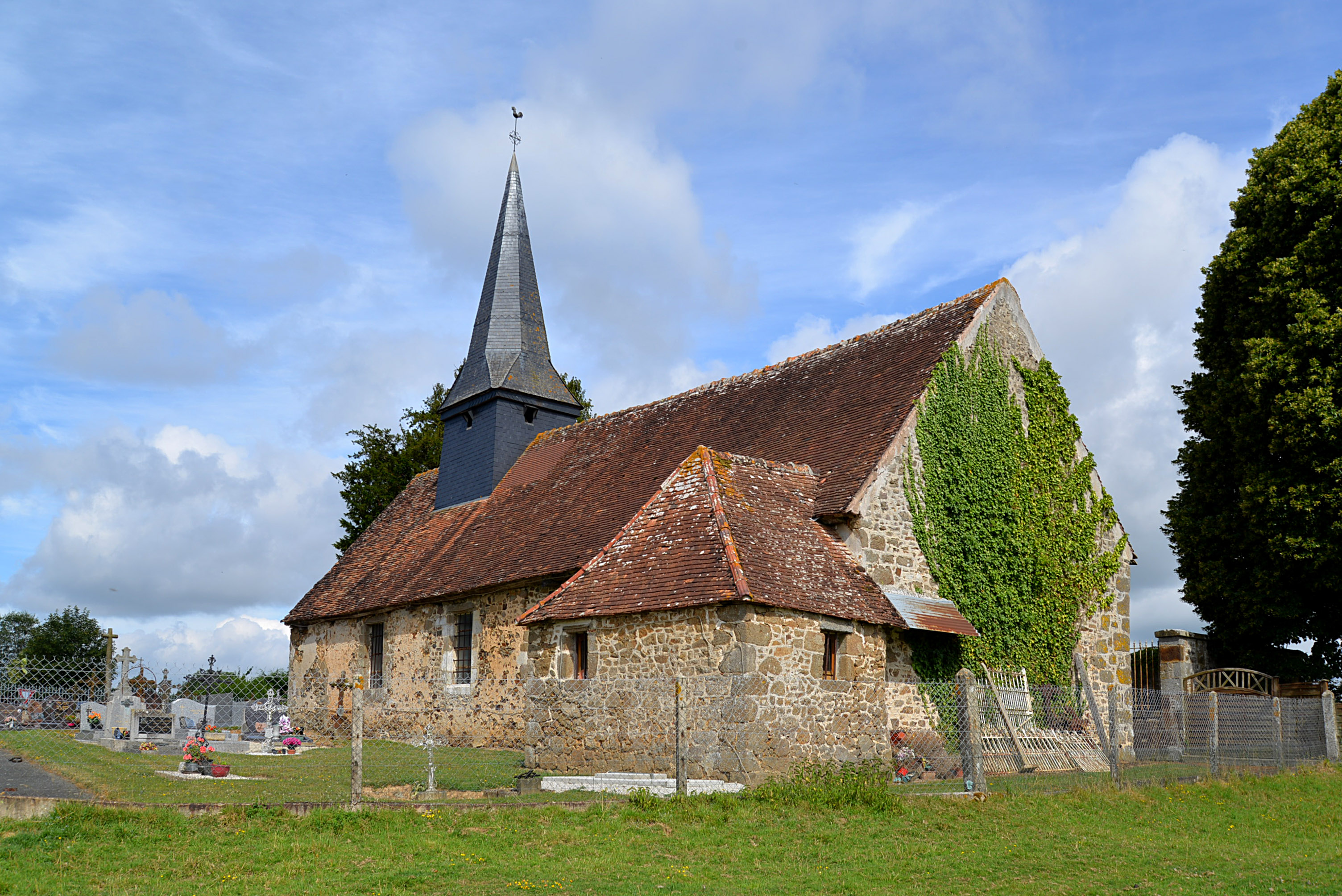
- The church in La Lande-de-Lougé
- Location of La Lande-de-Lougé
- Location within France Location within Normandy
- Coordinates: 48°41′37″N 0°14′57″W
- Country: France
- Region: Normandy
- Department: Orne
- Arrondissement: Argentan
- Canton: Magny-le-Désert
- Intercommunality: Terres d'Argentan Interco

Government
  - Mayor (2020–2026): Jacques Drouin
- Area^{1}: 4.95 km^{2} (1.91 sq mi)
- Elevation: 222 m (728 ft)
- Highest elevation: 252 m (827 ft)
- Lowest elevation: 179 m (587 ft)
- Population (2023): 57
  - Density: 12/km^{2} (30/sq mi)
- Time zone: UTC+01:00 (CET)
  - Summer (DST): UTC+02:00 (CEST)
- INSEE/Postal code: 61217 /61210
- ^{1} French Land Register data, which excludes lakes, ponds, glaciers > 1 km^{2} (0.386 sq mi or 247 acres) and river estuaries.

La Lande-de-Lougé (French pronunciation: [la lɑ̃d də luʒe]) is a commune in the Orne department in north-western France.

== Geography ==
The commune is made up of the following collection of villages and hamlets, Les Vallées and La Lande-de-Lougé.

La Lande-de-Lougé along with another 65 communes is part of a 20,593 hectare, Natura 2000 conservation area, called the Haute vallée de l'Orne et affluents.

There are 2 watercourses that traverse through the commune, the river Maire and a stream called the Vallées.

== See also ==
- Communes of the Orne department
