= Rânes =

- Commune
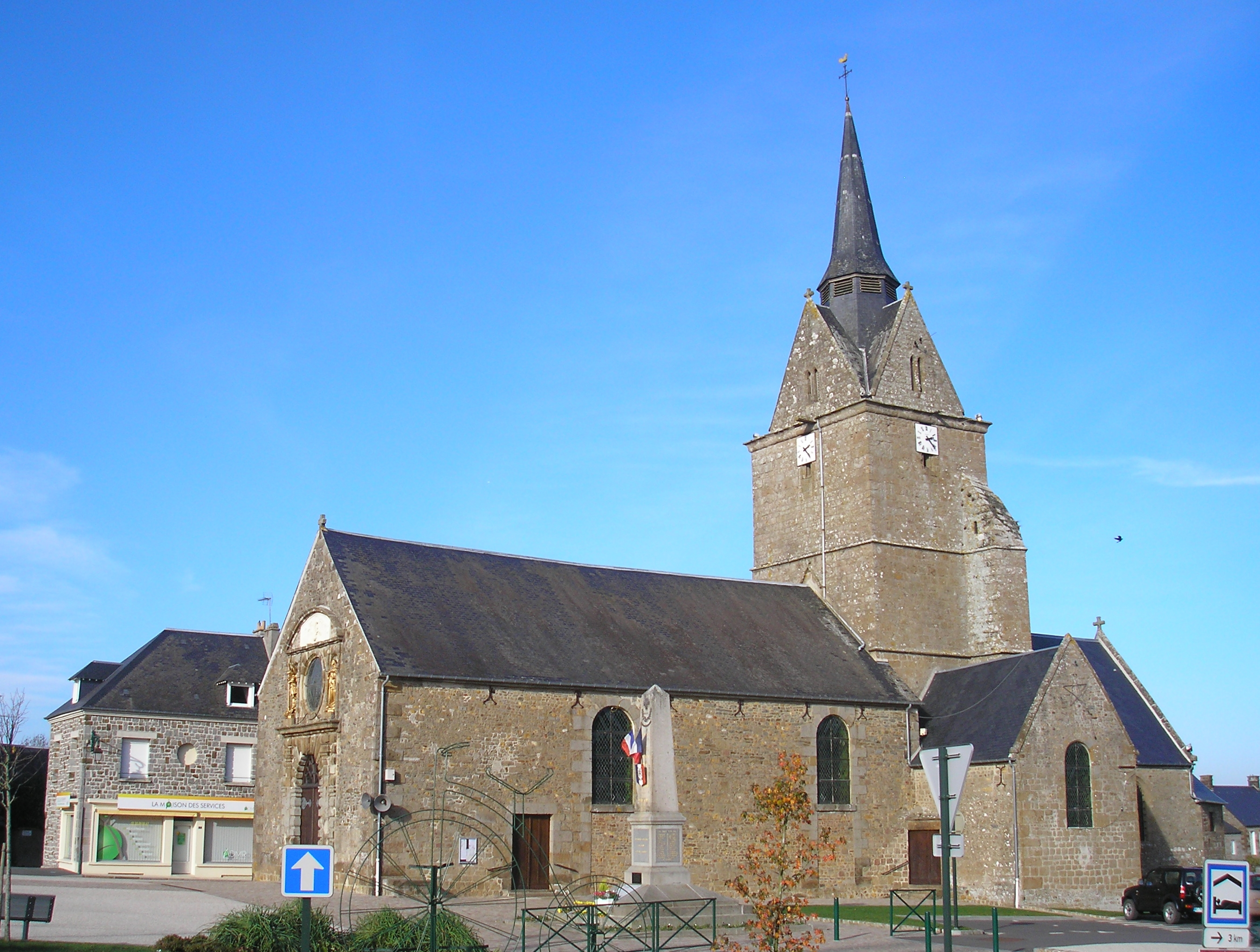
- The church in Rânes
- Location of Rânes
- Location within France Location within Normandy
- Coordinates: 48°38′29″N 0°12′31″W
- Country: France
- Region: Normandy
- Department: Orne
- Arrondissement: Argentan
- Canton: Magny-le-Désert
- Intercommunality: Terres d'Argentan Interco

Government
  - Mayor (2020–2026): Pierre Couprit
- Area^{1}: 34.18 km^{2} (13.20 sq mi)
- Elevation: 237 m (778 ft)
- Highest elevation: 317 m (1,040 ft)
- Lowest elevation: 196 m (643 ft)
- Population (2023): 1,036
  - Density: 30.31/km^{2} (78.50/sq mi)
- Demonym: Rânais
- Time zone: UTC+01:00 (CET)
  - Summer (DST): UTC+02:00 (CEST)
- INSEE/Postal code: 61344 /61150
- ^{1} French Land Register data, which excludes lakes, ponds, glaciers > 1 km^{2} (0.386 sq mi or 247 acres) and river estuaries.

Rânes (French pronunciation: [ʁan]) is a commune in the Orne department in north-western France.

== Geography ==
The commune is made up of the following collection of villages and hamlets, Les Beauchards, La Nuguerie, La Forêterie, Le Chêne Angot, L'Auramière, Rânes, Le Bisson, Le Ménil Angot, Les Vieux Parcs, Pringault, La Robillardière and La Barbelière.

It is 3,420 hectares (13.2 sq mi) in size. The highest point in the commune is 246 metres (807 ft).

Rânes along with another 65 communes is part of a 20,593 hectare, Natura 2000 conservation area, called the Haute vallée de l'Orne et affluents.

The river Maire along with six streams, the Rouvray, the Gosu, La Noeve, the Aunais, the Chalau, and the Masses and the Moulin de Besnard are the seven watercourses that traverse the commune.

== Main sights and notable buildings ==
- Musée de la Préhistoire - Museum dedicated to revealing how Neanderthal man, lived in and around Rânes, between 150,000 and 40,000 years ago.
- Hippodrome du Parc - is a racecourse for horse racing, based in the grounds of The castle of Rânes.

=== National heritage sites ===
The Commune has 3 buildings and areas listed as a Monument historique.

- The castle of Rânes a 14th-century chateau that was declared a monument in 1975.
- Circular enclosure of Couillardière an 11th to 12th century Medieval circular enclosure that was declared a monument in 1994.
- Berghes funeral chapel built in 1873 this family funeral chapel, was designed by Victor Ruprich-Robert and listed as a monument in 2010.

== Heraldry ==
Arms of Rânes	The arms of Rânes are blazoned : Quarterly gules and argent, 3 frogs (overall) contourny proper.

== Twin towns – sister cities ==
Rânes is twinned with:

- Ronnenburg-Ihme Roloven, Germany

== See also ==
- Communes of the Orne department
- Château de la Motte, Joué du Plain
