= Avoine, Orne =

Avoine
- Commune
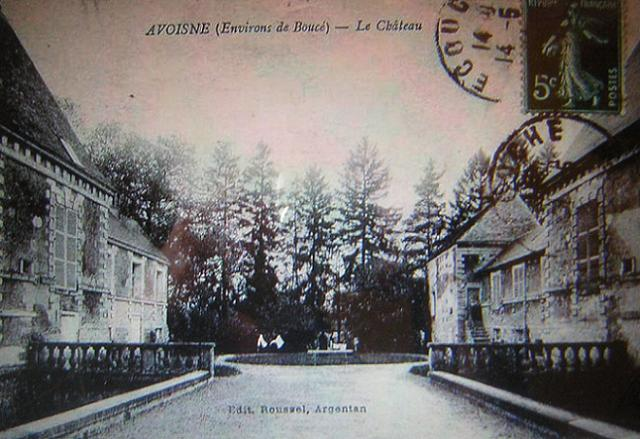
- The chateau in Avoine in the early 20th century
- Location of Avoine
- Location within France Location within Normandy
- Coordinates: 48°40′21″N 0°05′40″W
- Country: France
- Region: Normandy
- Department: Orne
- Arrondissement: Argentan
- Canton: Magny-le-Désert
- Intercommunality: Terres d'Argentan Interco

Government
  - Mayor (2020–2026): Philippe Garnier
- Area^{1}: 9.43 km^{2} (3.64 sq mi)
- Elevation: 183 m (600 ft)
- Highest elevation: 214 m (702 ft)
- Lowest elevation: 152 m (499 ft)
- Population (2023): 219
  - Density: 23.2/km^{2} (60.1/sq mi)
- Time zone: UTC+01:00 (CET)
  - Summer (DST): UTC+02:00 (CEST)
- INSEE/Postal code: 61020 /61150
- ^{1} French Land Register data, which excludes lakes, ponds, glaciers > 1 km^{2} (0.386 sq mi or 247 acres) and river estuaries.

Avoine (French pronunciation: [avwan]) is a commune in the Orne department in northwestern France.

== Geography ==
The commune is made up of the following collection of villages and hamlets, Le Breuil,La Villette, Le Montpertuis and Avoine.

The commune is within the area known as the Plaine d'Argentan, which is known for its cereal growing fileds and horse stud farms.

It is 943 hectares (3.6 sq mi) in size. The average elevation of the commune is 183 metres (600 ft).

Avoine along with another 65 communes is part of a 20,593 hectare, Natura 2000 conservation area, called the Haute vallée de l'Orne et affluents.

The River Cance and the Poncey stream traverse through the commune.

== Population ==
Historical population
Year	Pop.	±% p.a.
1968	295	—
1975	248	−2.45%
1982	254	+0.34%
1990	231	−1.18%
1999	227	−0.19%
2007	245	+0.96%
2012	238	−0.58%
2017	218	−1.74%
2023	219	+0.08%
Source: INSEE

== Notable buildings and places ==
=== National heritage sites ===
- Château d'Avoines 17th century chateau listed as a Monument historique in 1979.

== See also ==
- Communes of the Orne department
- Château de la Motte, Joué du Plain
