= Carrouges =

- Commune
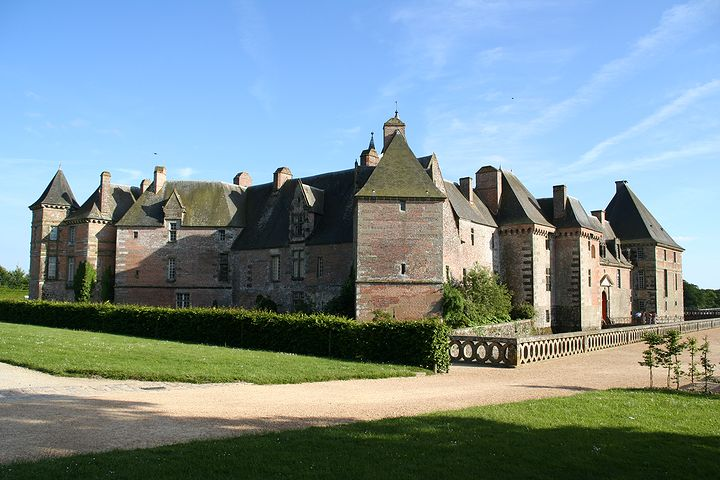
- The château in Carrouges

- Coat of arms
- Location of Carrouges
- Location within France Location within Normandy
- Coordinates: 48°34′06″N 0°08′40″W
- Country: France
- Region: Normandy
- Department: Orne
- Arrondissement: Alençon
- Canton: Magny-le-Désert
- Intercommunality: Pays fertois et Bocage carrougien

Government
  - Mayor (2020–2026): Pierre Chivard
- Area^{1}: 8.58 km^{2} (3.31 sq mi)
- Elevation: 335 m (1,099 ft)
- Highest elevation: 361 m (1,184 ft)
- Lowest elevation: 240 m (790 ft)
- Population (2023): 623
  - Density: 72.6/km^{2} (188/sq mi)
- Time zone: UTC+01:00 (CET)
  - Summer (DST): UTC+02:00 (CEST)
- INSEE/Postal code: 61074 /61320
- ^{1} French Land Register data, which excludes lakes, ponds, glaciers > 1 km^{2} (0.386 sq mi or 247 acres) and river estuaries.

Carrouges (French pronunciation: [kaʁuʒ]) is a commune in the Orne department in north-western France.

The inhabitants are known as Carrougiens and Carrougiennes. The town is home to a castle (Château de Carrouges), built in the 14th century by Jean de Carrouges and restored after the Hundred Years War.

== Geography ==
The commune is made up of the following collection of villages and hamlets, Le Fay, L'Augrumière and Carrouges.

It is 860 hectares (3.3 sq mi) in size. The highest point in the commune is 332 metres (1,089 ft).

The commune is within the Normandie-Maine Regional Natural Park and Forêt d'Écouves.

Carrouges along with another 65 communes is part of a 20,593 hectare, Natura 2000 conservation area, called the Haute vallée de l'Orne et affluents.

The commune has one river, the Udon, with four streams, Grand Pied, Moulin de Besnard, Noes Morins and Rohan, which are the only watercourses flowing through its borders.

== History ==
In the Middle Ages, Carrouges was part of the deanery of Asnebec. In 1490, under King Charles VIII, Jean de Blosset, Lord of Carrouges and grand marshal of Normandy, founded on his land, with its castle, a college (dedicated to Our Lady of Good Comfort) six canons payments the appointment of the lord who was also the collateur profits. These payments were estimated in 1698 to 200 pounds in Memory of the General Alençon by the intendant, M. de Pommereuil. It is also stated in 1698, that a court called "breadbasket tax" (related to gabelle paid on the salt) was located in Carrouges.

During the French Revolution of 1789, the town was called "Carrouges-la-Montagne". In August 1944, occupied by German forces, the city was liberated by the troops of the 3rd U.S. armored division, following the deeds of Mayor Geslain, who after being released from the German soldiers who had arrested him, indicated the positions of the Germans to the Americans.

== Notable buildings and places ==
La Ferme Ornée de Carrouges is a public garden in the style of a Ferme ornée, that is split into seven different gardens.

=== National heritage sites ===
The Commune has 2 buildings and areas listed as a Monument historique.

- Chapter is a set of buildings consisting of a 15th-century dwelling and the chapel.
- Château de Carrouges is a 15th-century chateau.

== Notable people ==
- Jean de Carrouges (1330-1396), a 14th-century knight was born here
- Pierre Jean Launay (1900-1982), a French writer was born here
- Michel Le Royer (1932-2022), a French TV and Film actor, who was born here
- Philippe Tranchant (born 1956), retired professional footballer was born here

== Twin town ==
- Carrouge, Switzerland since 2000.

== See also ==
- Communes of the Orne department
- Parc naturel régional Normandie-Maine
