= Le Château-d'Almenêches =

- Commune
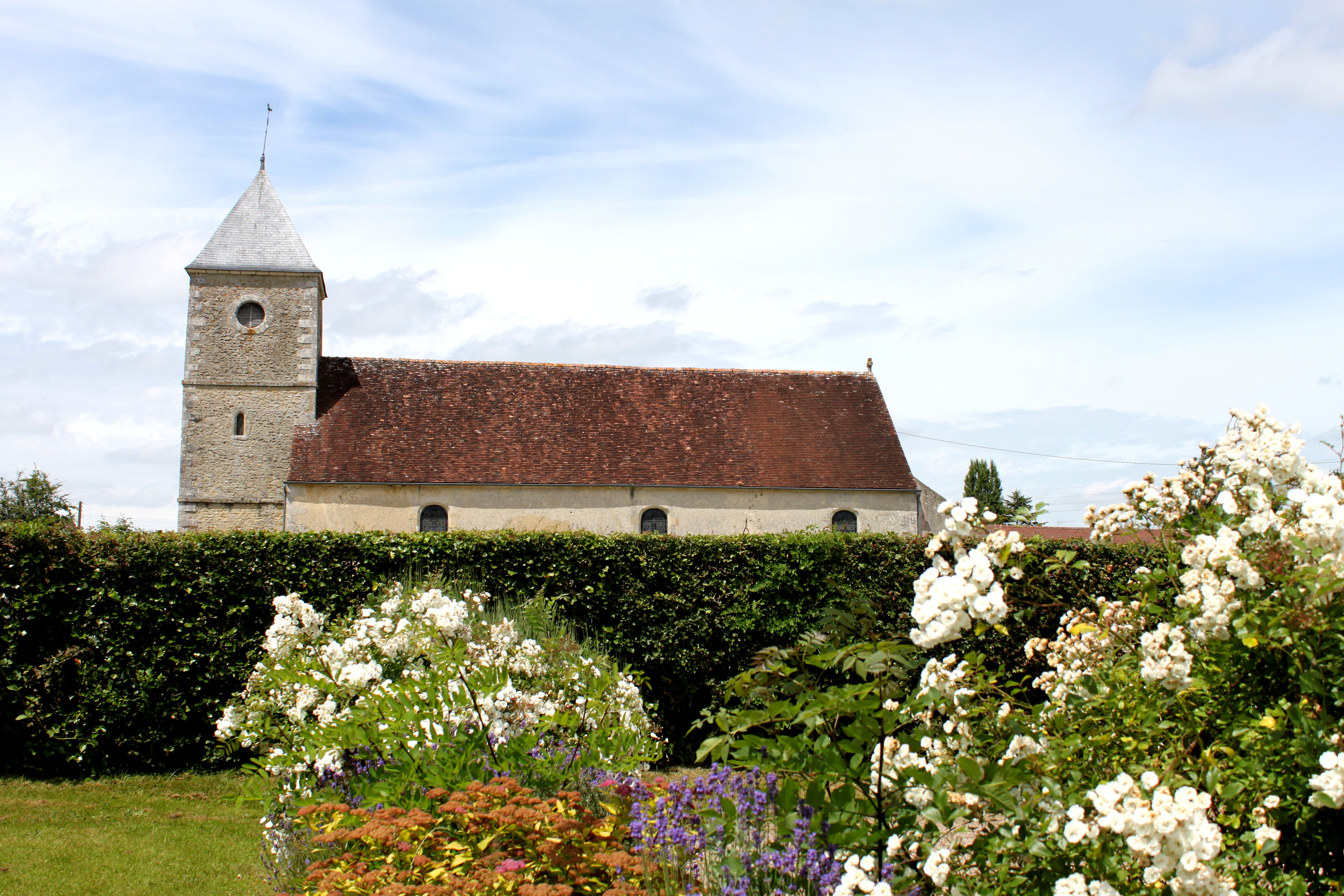
- The church of Le Château-d'Almenêches
- Location of Le Château-d'Almenêches
- Location within France Location within Normandy
- Coordinates: 48°40′48″N 0°07′23″E
- Country: France
- Region: Normandy
- Department: Orne
- Arrondissement: Alençon
- Canton: Sées
- Intercommunality: Sources de l'Orne

Government
  - Mayor (2020–2026): Serge Quellier
- Area^{1}: 10.76 km^{2} (4.15 sq mi)
- Elevation: 175 m (574 ft)
- Highest elevation: 193 m (633 ft)
- Lowest elevation: 160 m (520 ft)
- Population (2023): 182
  - Density: 16.9/km^{2} (43.8/sq mi)
- Time zone: UTC+01:00 (CET)
  - Summer (DST): UTC+02:00 (CEST)
- INSEE/Postal code: 61101 /61570
- ^{1} French Land Register data, which excludes lakes, ponds, glaciers > 1 km^{2} (0.386 sq mi or 247 acres) and river estuaries.

Le Château-d'Almenêches (French pronunciation: [lə ʃɑto dalmənɛːʃ]; literally 'The Château of Almenêches') is a commune in the Orne department in north-western France.

== Geography ==
The commune of is made up of the following villages and hamlets, Les Planches, Ménil Gautier, Le Parc, La Chaise, Le Grand Chemin, La Huetterie, Maroger, L'Oliverie and Château-d'Almenêches.

Le Château-d'Almenêches along with another 65 communes is part of a 20,593 hectare, Natura 2000 conservation area, called the Haute vallée de l'Orne et affluents.

Le Château-d'Almenêches has a total of 8 water courses running through it, two rivers Orne, and Don. The other six watercourses are all streams, the Querpont, The Plessis, la Gironde, The Essards, The Fausse Rivière, & the Essarts.

== Transport ==
Surdon station, located in the commune, is a railway junction with connections to Argentan, Caen, Paris, Le Mans and Granville.

== See also ==
- Communes of the Orne department
