= Ferrières-la-Verrerie =

- Commune
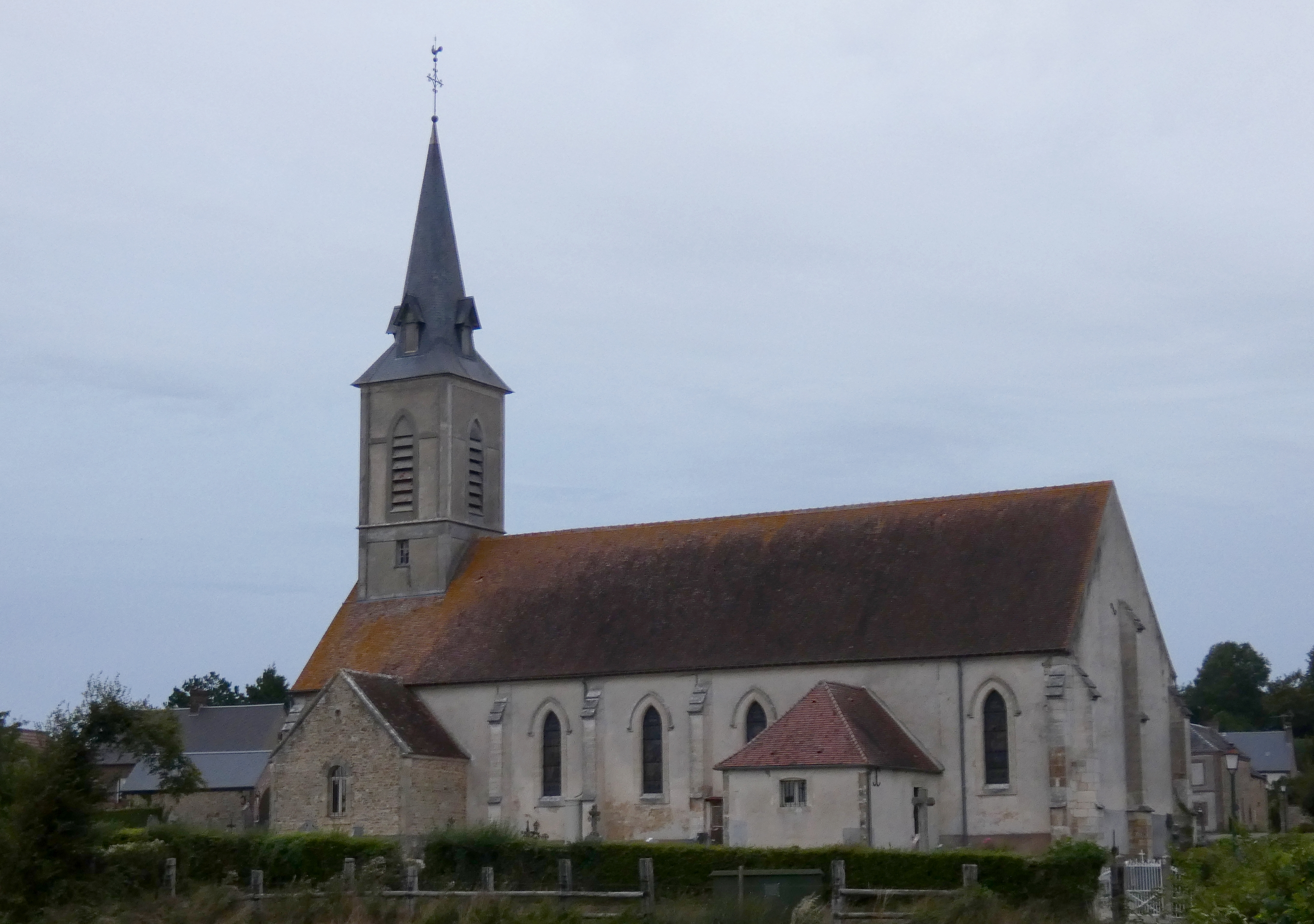
- Location of Ferrières-la-Verrerie
- Location within France Location within Normandy
- Coordinates: 48°39′12″N 0°22′37″E
- Country: France
- Region: Normandy
- Department: Orne
- Arrondissement: Alençon
- Canton: Écouves
- Intercommunality: Vallée de la Haute Sarthe

Government
  - Mayor (2020–2026): Béatrice Métayer
- Area^{1}: 14.58 km^{2} (5.63 sq mi)
- Elevation: 309 m (1,014 ft)
- Highest elevation: 307 m (1,007 ft)
- Lowest elevation: 176 m (577 ft)
- Population (2023): 161
  - Density: 11.0/km^{2} (28.6/sq mi)
- Time zone: UTC+01:00 (CET)
  - Summer (DST): UTC+02:00 (CEST)
- INSEE/Postal code: 61166 /61390
- ^{1} French Land Register data, which excludes lakes, ponds, glaciers > 1 km^{2} (0.386 sq mi or 247 acres) and river estuaries.

Ferrières-la-Verrerie (French pronunciation: [fɛʁjɛʁ la vɛʁ.ʁi]) is a commune in the Orne department in north-western France.

== Geography ==
Ferrières-la-Verrerie is made up of the following collection of villages and hamlets, Louvigny, Cochet, Ferrières-la-Verrerie, La Potinière, Le Grand Frêne and La Morandière.

Ferrières-la-Verrerie along with another 65 communes is part of a 20,593 hectare, Natura 2000 conservation area, called the Haute vallée de l'Orne et affluents.

Three rivers the Risle, Le Fay and The Don flows through the commune. In addition two streams, Ruisseau de la Genevraie and Ruisseau de loisellière traverse through the commune.

== See also ==
- Communes of the Orne department
