= Médavy =

- Commune
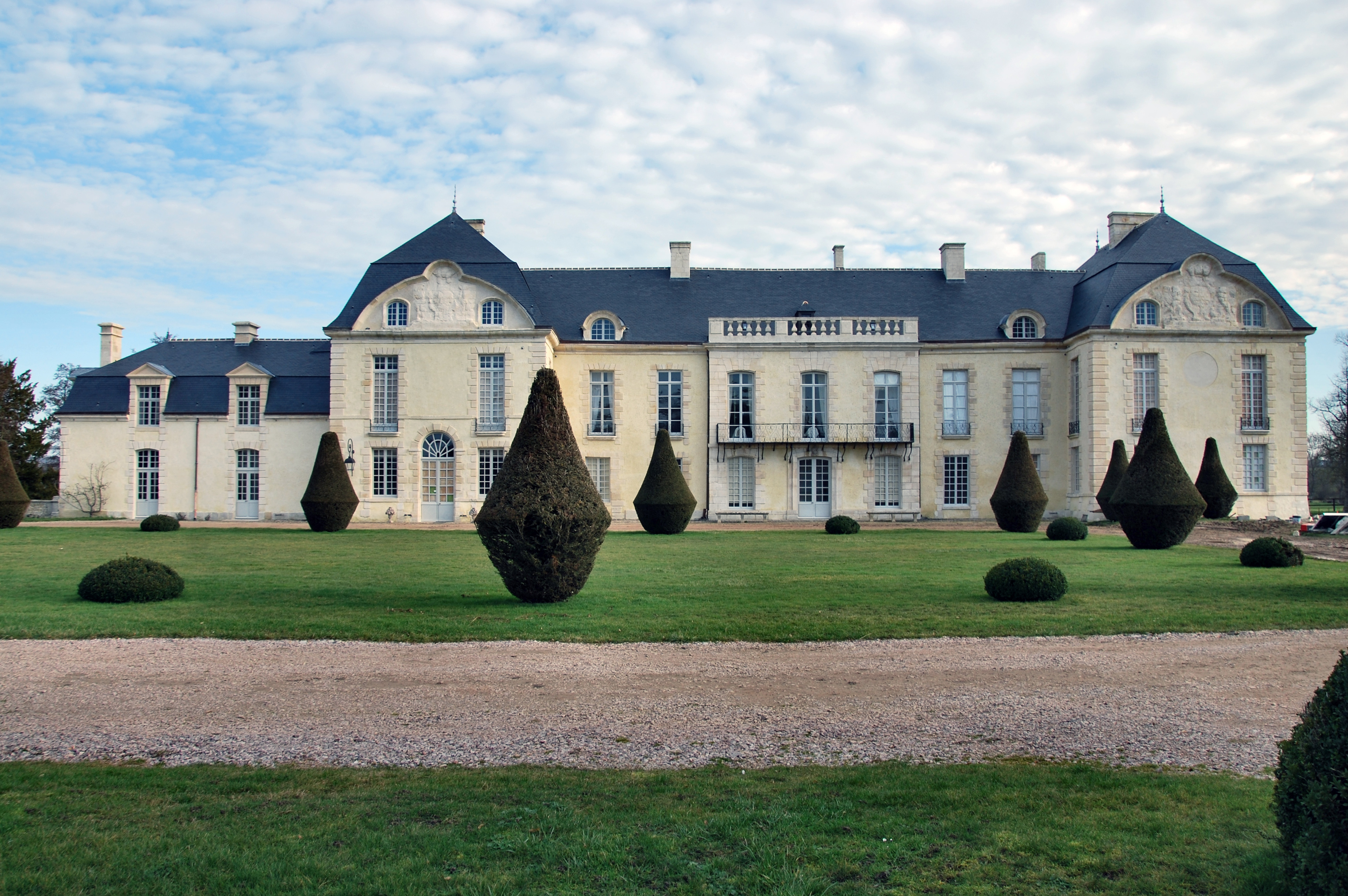
- The chateau in Médavy
- Location of Médavy
- Location within France Location within Normandy
- Coordinates: 48°40′42″N 0°05′26″E
- Country: France
- Region: Normandy
- Department: Orne
- Arrondissement: Alençon
- Canton: Sées
- Intercommunality: Sources de l'Orne

Government
  - Mayor (2020–2026): Vincent Six
- Area^{1}: 4.34 km^{2} (1.68 sq mi)
- Elevation: 170 m (560 ft)
- Highest elevation: 192 m (630 ft)
- Lowest elevation: 158 m (518 ft)
- Population (2023): 152
  - Density: 35.0/km^{2} (90.7/sq mi)
- Time zone: UTC+01:00 (CET)
  - Summer (DST): UTC+02:00 (CEST)
- INSEE/Postal code: 61256 /61570
- ^{1} French Land Register data, which excludes lakes, ponds, glaciers > 1 km^{2} (0.386 sq mi or 247 acres) and river estuaries.

Médavy (French pronunciation: [medavi]) is a commune in the Orne department in north-western France.

== Geography ==
The commune of is made up of the following villages and hamlets, Le Repos and Médavy.

Médavy, along with another 65 communes, is part of a 20,593 hectare, Natura 2000 conservation area, called the Haute vallée de l'Orne et affluents.

Médavy has 4 water courses running through it, two rivers Orne and Don plus two streams the Gironde and the Calvaire.

== Notable buildings and places ==
=== National heritage sites ===
The Commune has 2 buildings and areas listed as a Monument historique.

- Château à Médavy an 11th-century fortified house, that was later fortified into a castle in the 16th century, it was listed as a monument in 1926.
- Priory of Notre-Dame-du-Repos a 12th-century prioral church listed as a monument in 1989.

== See also ==
- Communes of the Orne department
