= Courgeoût =

- Commune
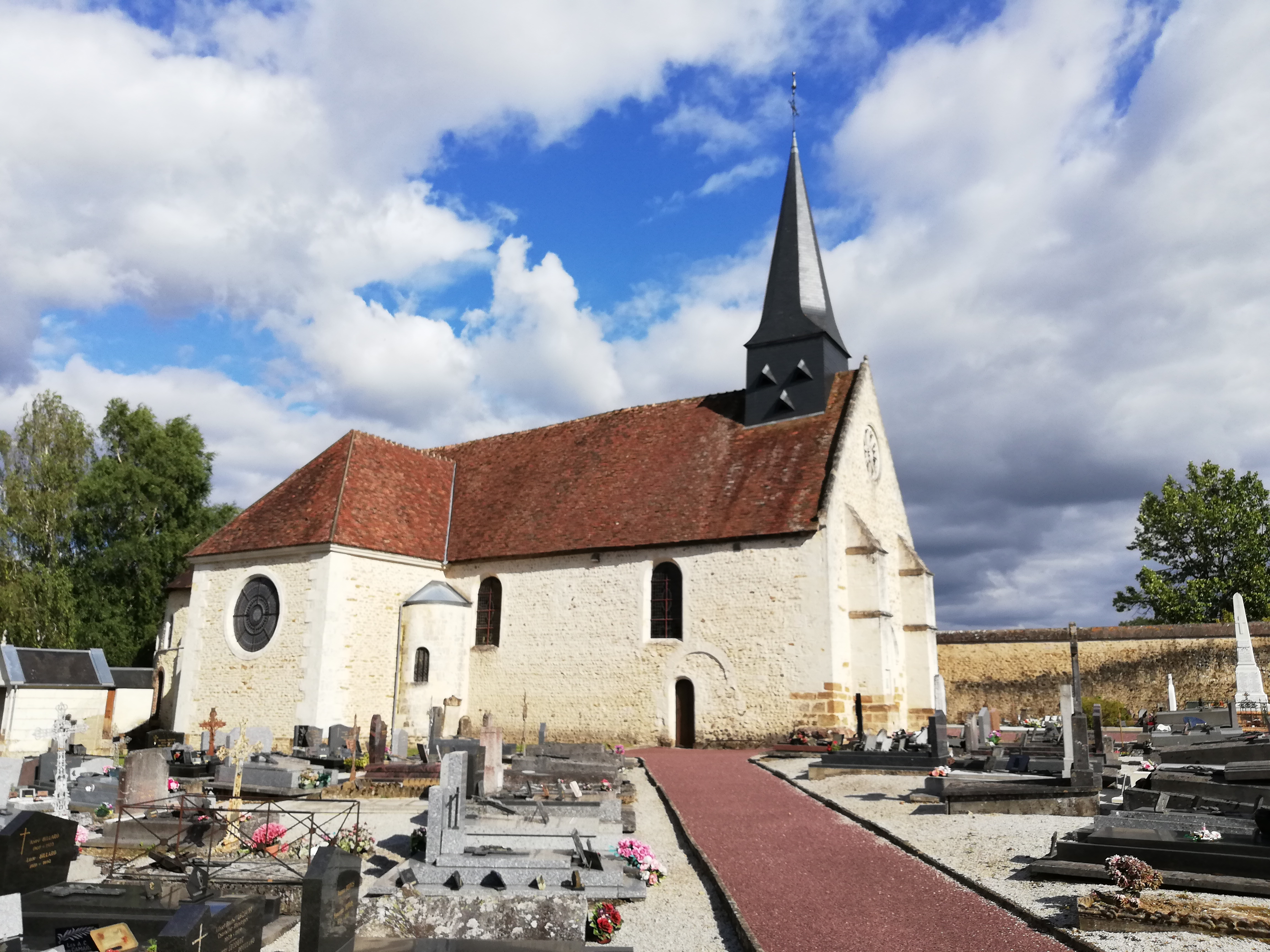
- Location of Courgeoût
- Location within France Location within Normandy
- Coordinates: 48°30′37″N 0°29′26″E
- Country: France
- Region: Normandy
- Department: Orne
- Arrondissement: Mortagne-au-Perche
- Canton: Mortagne-au-Perche
- Intercommunality: Pays de Mortagne au Perche

Government
  - Mayor (2020–2026): Yves Morinet
- Area^{1}: 17.82 km^{2} (6.88 sq mi)
- Elevation: 216 m (709 ft)
- Highest elevation: 279 m (915 ft)
- Lowest elevation: 165 m (541 ft)
- Population (2023): 458
  - Density: 25.7/km^{2} (66.6/sq mi)
- Time zone: UTC+01:00 (CET)
  - Summer (DST): UTC+02:00 (CEST)
- INSEE/Postal code: 61130 /61560
- ^{1} French Land Register data, which excludes lakes, ponds, glaciers > 1 km^{2} (0.386 sq mi or 247 acres) and river estuaries.

Courgeoût (French pronunciation: [kuʁʒu]) is a commune in the Orne department in north-western France.

== Geography ==
The commune is made up of the following collection of villages and hamlets, Surmont, L'Aunay, Les Marres, Les Guillets, Le Tremblet, La Fontenelle, Courgeoût, L'Aître Bernay, Les Barres and La Grossinière.

The river l'Erine traverses through the commune.

== Points of interest ==
- Arboretum de l'Étoile des Andaines - Created in 1947 this arboretum features over 70 hardwood and Conifer trees.
- Bois et coteaux a l'ouest de Mortagne-au-Perche is a Natura 2000 conservation site shared with Saint-Hilaire-le-Châtel measuring 36.37 Hectares. The site is hosts three varieties of insects, listed in Annex 2 of the Habitats Directive, which are the Marsh fritillary, Jersey tiger and the European stag beetle.

=== National heritage sites ===
The Commune has two buildings and areas listed as a Monument historique.

- Manoir de la Grossinière a seventeenth manor house with private chapel, which was registered as a monument in 2005.
- Jarossay Manor a sixteenth century manor house, registered as a Monument historique in 1998.

== See also ==
- Communes of the Orne department
