= Louis-Guillaume Perreaux =

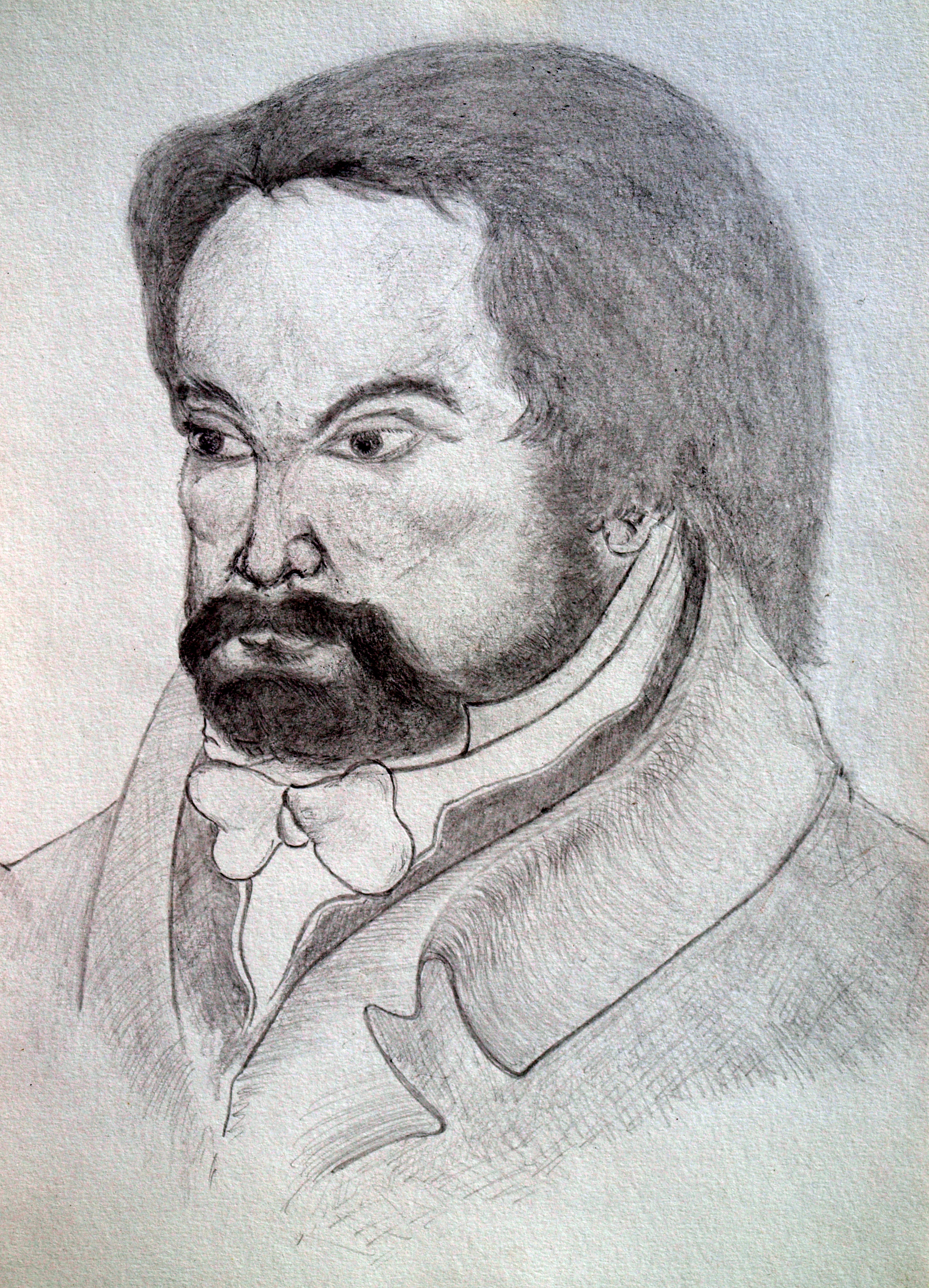
- A Drawing of Louis-Guillaume Perreaux
- Born: 19 February 1816; Almenêches, Normandy, France
- Died: 5 April 1889 (aged 73); Paris, France
- Occupations: Engineer and inventor

Louis-Guillaume Perreaux (19 February 1816 – 5 April 1889) was a French inventor and engineer who submitted one of the first patents for a working motorcycle in 1869.

== Early life ==
Perreaux was born in the village of Almenêches, in Normandy, France, on 19 February 1816. After attending elementary school in Almenêches he showed an early interest in engineering, inventing a cane gun (a type of walking stick with a gun concealed inside) at the age of 12. Perreaux was then sent to the Minor Seminary of Sees where he formed the ideas that were later published in his first book in 1877, the two-volume Lois de l'univers principe de la création (Laws of the Universe), which is now in the Bibliothèque Nationale in Paris. He secured a scholarship to the School of Arts and Crafts at Châlons-sur-Marne in 1836.

== Inventions ==
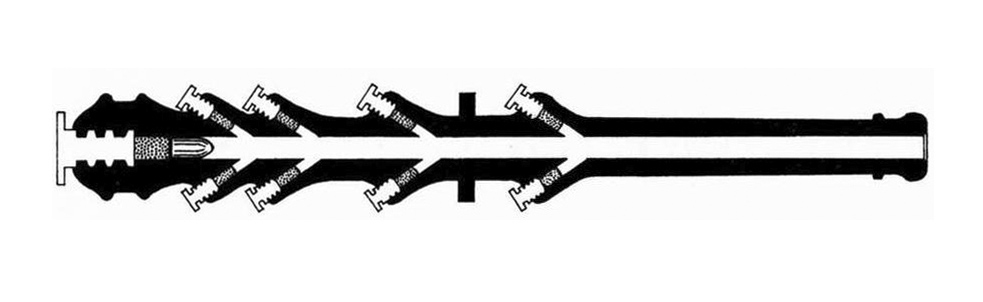
Perreaux's multi-charge gun

Perreaux moved to Paris, where he began working on and patenting a range of inventions including a multi-chambered gun, a lock mechanism in 1841, a circular power saw in 1843 and scientific instruments such as the Perreaux Dividing Machine, invented in 1846, which could precisely calibrate the divisions on a glass thermometer using a screw driven micrometer with a chisel attachment or accurately measure the distance between two points to within a micron (one thousandth of a millimeter).

== Steam velocipede ==
Perreaux experimented with a small steam engine in a bicycle frame, contributing to the invention of the first motorcycle. Perreaux patented this design under number 83,691 on 16 March 1869 (and continued to improve his invention until 1885). The design featured a brass-plated single-cylinder steam engine with an alcohol fuel burner under the saddle of a French-made Michaux velocipede bicycle. Drive was by twin belts, and it was capable of about 9 miles per hour (14 km/h). The original machine is on display in the Musée de l’Île-de-France at the Château de Sceaux.

== Military tent ==
One of Perreaux's last inventions was in 1879 when he submitted Patent No. 128,656 for a "system of military tent poles without external cables and without pickets". As well as being much more rigid than conventional tents, Perreaux's design claimed to be simpler, lighter and therefore transportable for military use. He also proposed that several of his square-tent designs could be erected together to form a gallery.
