= Arrondissements of the Orne department =

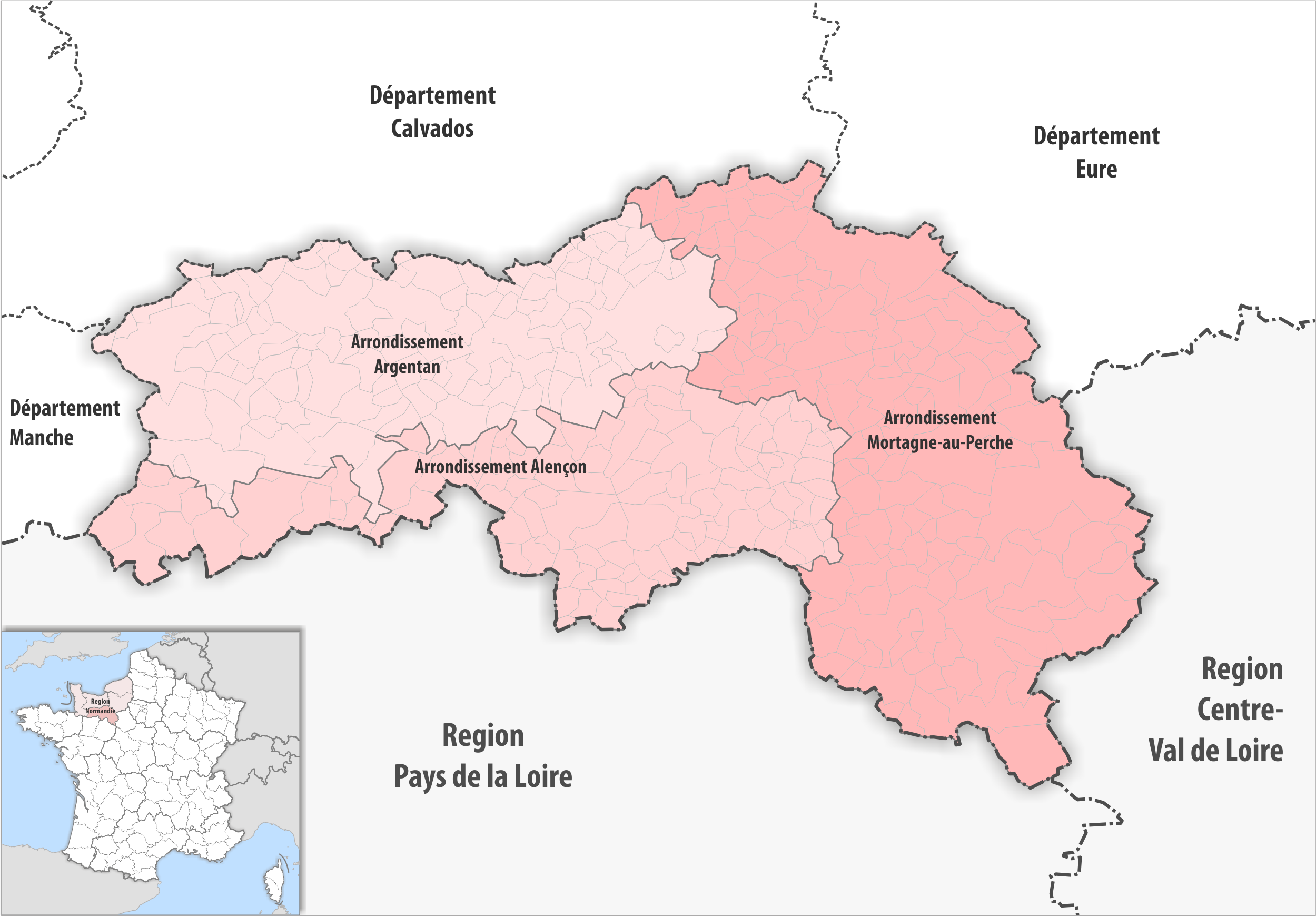
Map of arrondissements of the Orne department.

The 3 arrondissements of the Orne department are:

1. Arrondissement of Alençon, (prefecture of the Orne department: Alençon) with 111 communes. The population of the arrondissement was 84,879 in 2021.
2. Arrondissement of Argentan, (subprefecture: Argentan) with 123 communes. The population of the arrondissement was 107,625 in 2021.
3. Arrondissement of Mortagne-au-Perche, (subprefecture: Mortagne-au-Perche) with 151 communes. The population of the arrondissement was 84,469 in 2021.

== History ==
In 1800, the arrondissements of Alençon, Argentan, Domfront and Mortagne-au-Perche were established. The arrondissements of Domfront and Mortagne-au-Perche were disbanded in 1926, and Then, Mortagne-au-Perche was restored in 1942.

The borders of the arrondissements of Orne were modified in January 2017:

- 11 communes from the arrondissement of Alençon to the arrondissement of Argentan
- one commune from the arrondissement of Alençon to the arrondissement of Mortagne-au-Perche
- nine communes from the arrondissement of Argentan to the arrondissement of Alençon
- 49 communes from the arrondissement of Argentan to the arrondissement of Mortagne-au-Perche
- five communes from the arrondissement of Mortagne-au-Perche to the arrondissement of Alençon
