= Brullemail =

- Commune
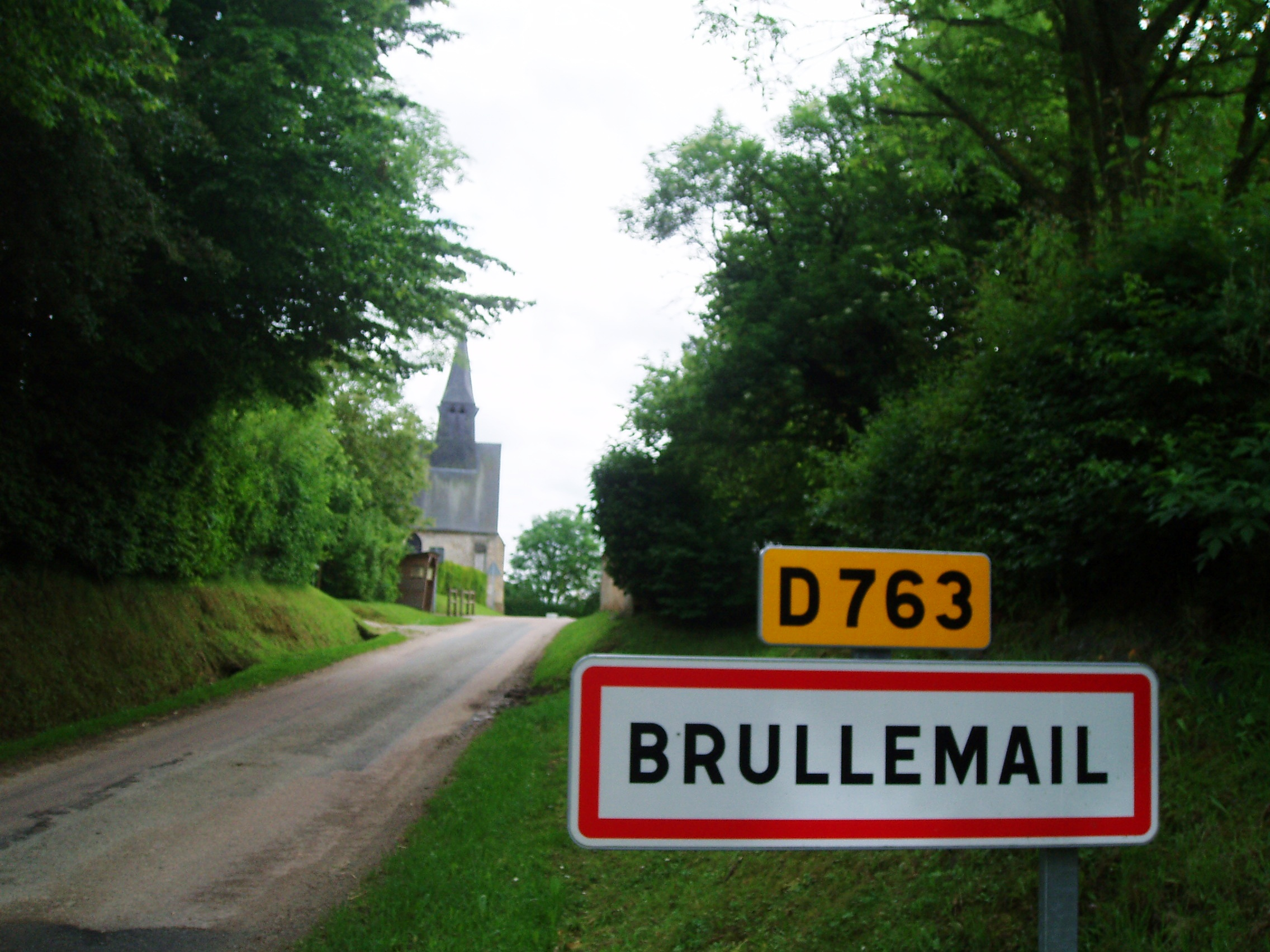
- The road into Brullemail
- Location of Brullemail
- Location within France Location within Normandy
- Coordinates: 48°39′29″N 0°19′46″E
- Country: France
- Region: Normandy
- Department: Orne
- Arrondissement: Alençon
- Canton: Écouves

Government
  - Mayor (2020–2026): Geoffroy de La Ferté
- Area^{1}: 10.28 km^{2} (3.97 sq mi)
- Elevation: 239 m (784 ft)
- Highest elevation: 303 m (994 ft)
- Lowest elevation: 184 m (604 ft)
- Population (2023): 90
  - Density: 8.8/km^{2} (23/sq mi)
- Time zone: UTC+01:00 (CET)
  - Summer (DST): UTC+02:00 (CEST)
- INSEE/Postal code: 61064 /61390
- ^{1} French Land Register data, which excludes lakes, ponds, glaciers > 1 km^{2} (0.386 sq mi or 247 acres) and river estuaries.

Brullemail (French pronunciation: [bʁylmaj]) is a commune in the Orne department in northwestern France.

== Geography ==
The commune is made up of the following collection of villages and hamlets, Roumalard, L'Anglècherie, La Serre, Brullemail, La Mussoire, La Noé, Le Hamel, L'Outre, L'Aumône and La Grande Pièce.

Brullemail along with another 65 communes is part of a 20,593 hectare, Natura 2000 conservation area, called the Haute vallée de l'Orne et affluents.

The source the river Don is within this commune. In addition there are three streams, Ruisseau de Brullemail, Ruisseau de la Genevraie and Ruisseau des Monts Damain.

== Population ==
Historical population
| Year | Pop. | ±% p.a. |
|---|---|---|
| 1968 | 159 | — |
| 1975 | 135 | −2.31% |
| 1982 | 92 | −5.33% |
| 1990 | 80 | −1.73% |
| 1999 | 97 | +2.16% |
| 2007 | 108 | +1.35% |
| 2012 | 107 | −0.19% |
| 2017 | 95 | −2.35% |
| 2023 | 90 | −0.90% |
Source: INSEE

== See also ==
- Communes of the Orne department
