= Saint-Hilaire-le-Châtel =

- Commune
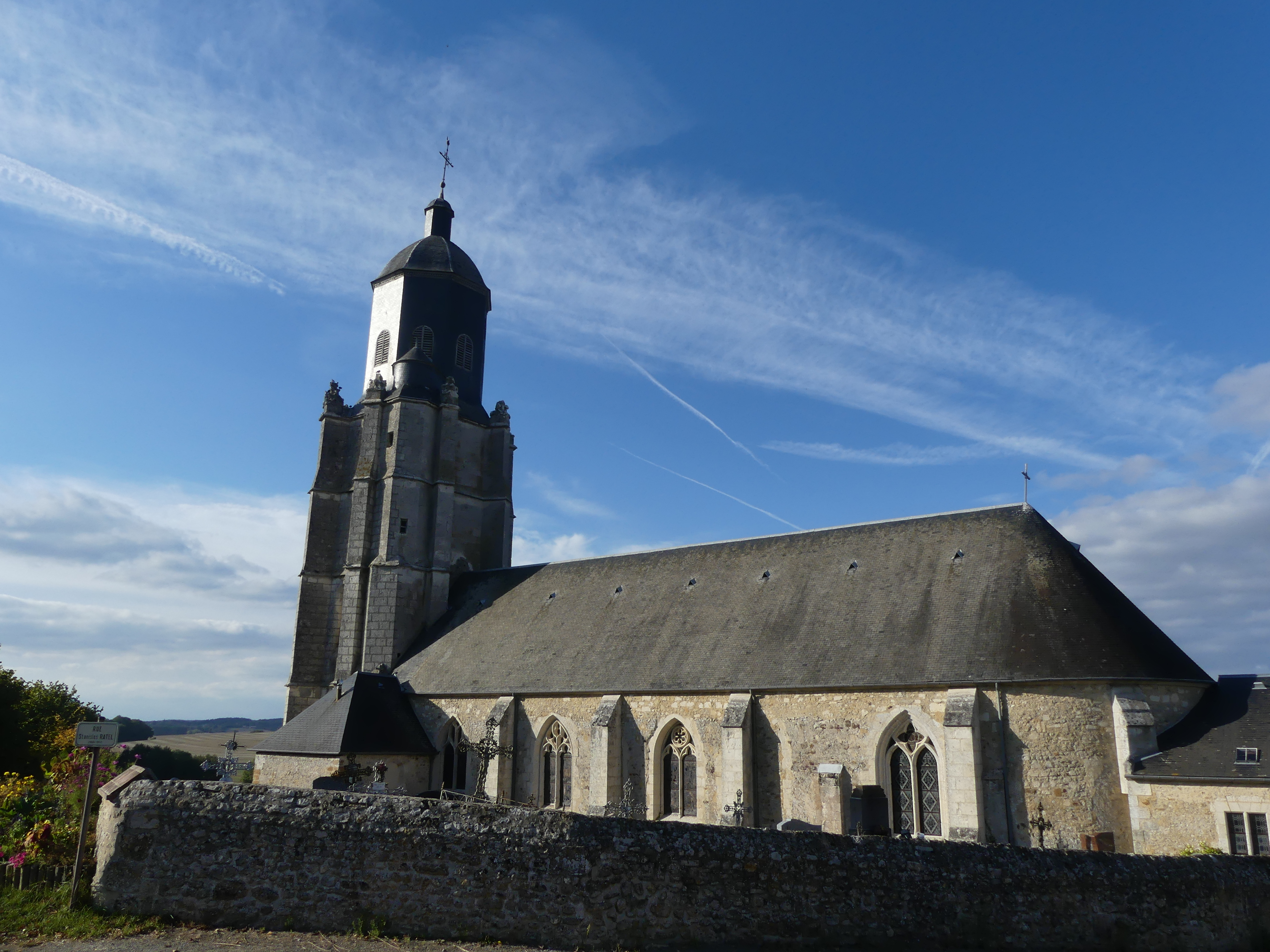
- The church in Saint-Hilaire-le-Châtel
- Location of Saint-Hilaire-le-Châtel
- Location within France Location within Normandy
- Coordinates: 48°33′56″N 0°31′55″E
- Country: France
- Region: Normandy
- Department: Orne
- Arrondissement: Mortagne-au-Perche
- Canton: Mortagne-au-Perche
- Intercommunality: Pays de Mortagne au Perche

Government
  - Mayor (2020–2026): Philippe Blutel
- Area^{1}: 22.34 km^{2} (8.63 sq mi)
- Elevation: 176 m (577 ft)
- Highest elevation: 294 m (965 ft)
- Lowest elevation: 167 m (548 ft)
- Population (2023): 667
  - Density: 29.9/km^{2} (77.3/sq mi)
- Time zone: UTC+01:00 (CET)
  - Summer (DST): UTC+02:00 (CEST)
- INSEE/Postal code: 61404 /61400
- ^{1} French Land Register data, which excludes lakes, ponds, glaciers > 1 km^{2} (0.386 sq mi or 247 acres) and river estuaries.

Saint-Hilaire-le-Châtel (French pronunciation: [sɛ̃.t‿ilɛʁ lə ʃatɛl]) is a commune in the Orne department in north-western France.

== Points of Interest ==
- Bois et coteaux a l'ouest de Mortagne-au-Perche is a Natura 2000 conservation site shared with Courgeoût measuring 36.37 Hectares. The site is hosts three varieties of insects, listed in Annex 2 of the Habitats Directive, which are the Marsh fritillary, Jersey tiger and the European stag beetle.

== Transport ==
- Aérodrome de Mortagne-au-Perche is an Aerodrome within the commune which is also shared with neighbouring communes of Saint-Langis-lès-Mortagne that opened in 1978. Its ICAO airport code is LFAX. The airport has a 720 metre by 18 metre runway that was created in 1985.

== Climate ==
Saint-Hilaire-le-Châtel benefits from an oceanic climate with mild winters and temperate summers.

Climate data for Saint-Hilaire-le-Châtel (2003–2020 normals, extremes 2003–2024)
Month	Jan	Feb	Mar	Apr	May	Jun	Jul	Aug	Sep	Oct	Nov	Dec	Year
Record high °C (°F)	13.9 (57.0)	19.4 (66.9)	23.2 (73.8)	27.8 (82.0)	29.1 (84.4)	37 (99)	40.5 (104.9)	36.6 (97.9)	33.5 (92.3)	28.4 (83.1)	21.9 (71.4)	14.7 (58.5)	40.5 (104.9)
Mean daily maximum °C (°F)	6.6 (43.9)	7.5 (45.5)	10.8 (51.4)	15.3 (59.5)	18.1 (64.6)	22 (72)	24.6 (76.3)	23.4 (74.1)	20.7 (69.3)	15.5 (59.9)	10.4 (50.7)	7.1 (44.8)	15.2 (59.4)
Daily mean °C (°F)	4.3 (39.7)	4.7 (40.5)	7.2 (45.0)	10.6 (51.1)	13.3 (55.9)	16.8 (62.2)	19 (66)	18.4 (65.1)	16 (61)	12.3 (54.1)	7.9 (46.2)	4.7 (40.5)	11.3 (52.3)
Mean daily minimum °C (°F)	2 (36)	1.8 (35.2)	3.5 (38.3)	5.8 (42.4)	8.5 (47.3)	11.7 (53.1)	13.4 (56.1)	13.3 (55.9)	11.3 (52.3)	9 (48)	5.3 (41.5)	2.4 (36.3)	7.3 (45.1)
Record low °C (°F)	−11 (12)	−12.1 (10.2)	−9.7 (14.5)	−3.6 (25.5)	0.2 (32.4)	3.1 (37.6)	7.2 (45.0)	6.6 (43.9)	3.3 (37.9)	−0.4 (31.3)	−5.3 (22.5)	−8.6 (16.5)	−12.1 (10.2)
Average precipitation mm (inches)	70.6 (2.78)	53.9 (2.12)	69.1 (2.72)	48.8 (1.92)	70 (2.8)	62.6 (2.46)	51.6 (2.03)	54.3 (2.14)	36.3 (1.43)	68.6 (2.70)	73.4 (2.89)	82.8 (3.26)	732 (28.8)
Average precipitation days (≥ 1.0 mm)	14	11.2	11.5	9.1	9.5	9.5	8	9.4	7.2	11.3	12.5	13.2	126.3
Source: Meteociel

== See also ==
- Communes of the Orne department
