= Cantons of the Orne department =

The following is a list of the 21 cantons of the Orne department, in France, following the French canton reorganisation which came into effect in March 2015 (by alphabetical order):

- L'Aigle
- Alençon-1
- Alençon-2
- Argentan-1
- Argentan-2
- Athis-Val de Rouvre
- Bagnoles de l'Orne Normandie
- Bretoncelles
- Ceton
- Damigny
- Domfront en Poiraie
- Écouves
- La Ferté-Macé
- Flers-1
- Flers-2
- Magny-le-Désert
- Mortagne-au-Perche
- Rai
- Sées
- Tourouvre au Perche
- Vimoutiers
