= Don (tributary river of the Orne) =

- Location within France Location within Normandy

Location
- Country: France

Physical characteristics
- Source
  - location: Brullemail, Orne
- Mouth: Orne
  - coordinates: 48°39′58″N 0°20′51″W
- Length: 29.55 km (18.36 mi)

Basin features
- Progression: Orne→ English Channel

The Don (French pronunciation: [dɔ̃]) is a river in northwestern France, crossing the department of the Orne. It is 29.55 km long. Its source is in Brullemail, and it flows into the river Orne in the commune of Almenêches.

== Tributaries ==
The three biggest tributaries for the Don are:

1. La Senelle (12 km long)
2. Ruisseau Saint-Martin (8 km long)
3. Ruisseau des Monts Damain (5 km long)

== Communes ==
The Don passes through the following Communes:

1. Almenêches
2. Brullemail
3. Chailloué
4. Le Château-d'Almenêches
5. Ferrières-la-Verrerie
6. Médavy
7. Merlerault-le-Pin
8. Saint-Léonard-des-Parcs
