= Saint-Langis-lès-Mortagne =

- Commune
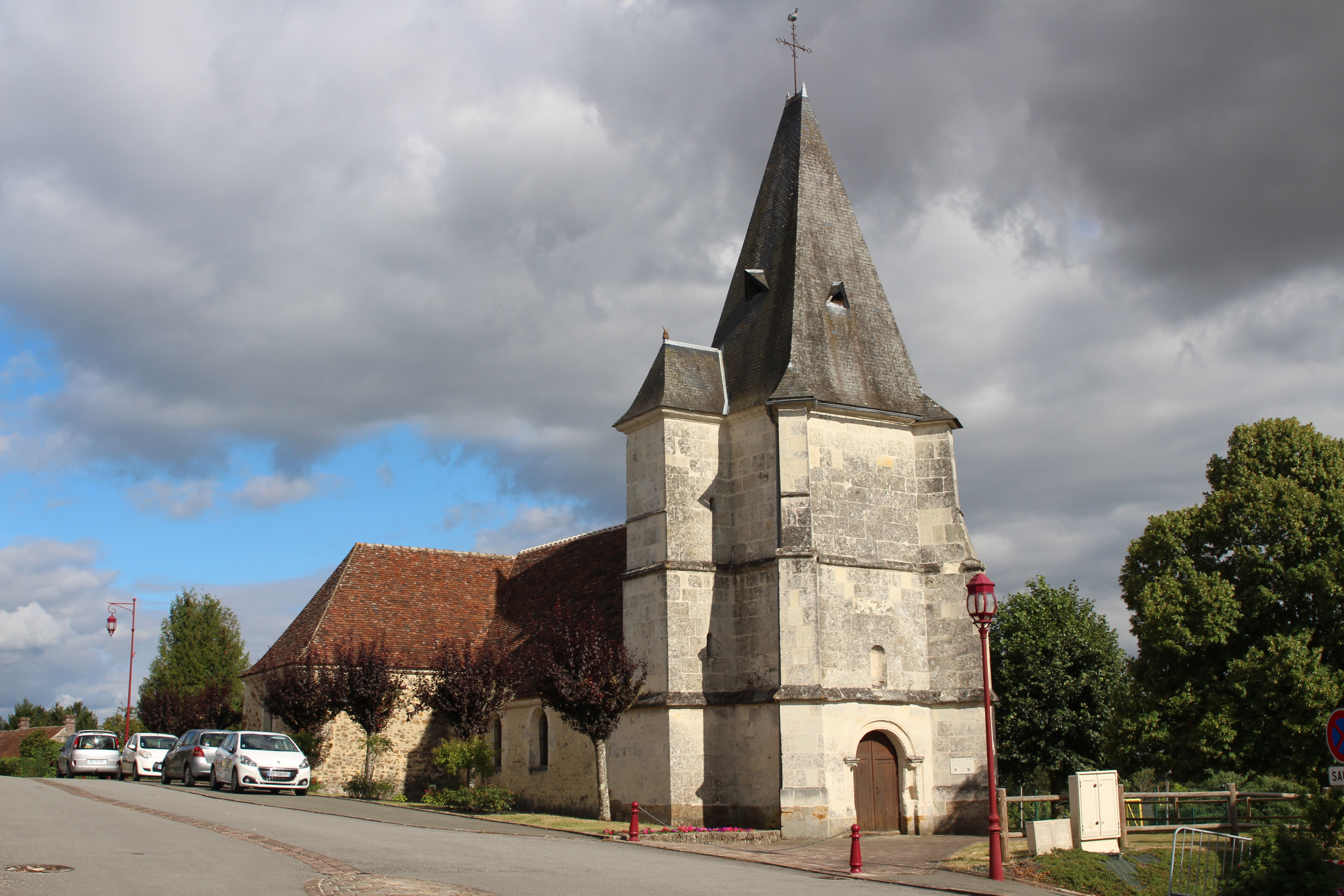
- Location of Saint-Langis-lès-Mortagne
- Location within France Location within Normandy
- Coordinates: 48°30′49″N 0°32′20″E
- Country: France
- Region: Normandy
- Department: Orne
- Arrondissement: Mortagne-au-Perche
- Canton: Mortagne-au-Perche

Government
  - Mayor (2020–2026): Bernard Surcin
- Area^{1}: 12.61 km^{2} (4.87 sq mi)
- Elevation: 205 m (673 ft)
- Highest elevation: 276 m (906 ft)
- Lowest elevation: 154 m (505 ft)
- Population (2023): 877
  - Density: 69.5/km^{2} (180/sq mi)
- Time zone: UTC+01:00 (CET)
  - Summer (DST): UTC+02:00 (CEST)
- INSEE/Postal code: 61414 /61400
- ^{1} French Land Register data, which excludes lakes, ponds, glaciers > 1 km^{2} (0.386 sq mi or 247 acres) and river estuaries.

Saint-Langis-lès-Mortagne (French pronunciation: [sɛ̃ lɑ̃ʒi lɛ mɔʁtaɲ], literally Saint-Langis near Mortagne) is a commune in the Orne department in north-western France.

== Geography ==
La Chippe is a watercourse that traverses through the commune.

== Points of interest ==
- Aérodrome de Mortagne-au-Perche is an Aerodrome within the commune which is also shared with neighbouring communes of Saint-Hilaire-le-Châtel that opened in 1978. Its ICAO airport code is LFAX. The airport has a 720 metre by 18 metre track that was created in 1985.

=== National heritage sites ===
- Prulay estate is a 100 hectares (0.4 sq mi) estate, featuring an eighteenth century chateau, it was listed as a Monument historique in 1998.

== See also ==
- Communes of the Orne department
