= Almenêches =

- Commune
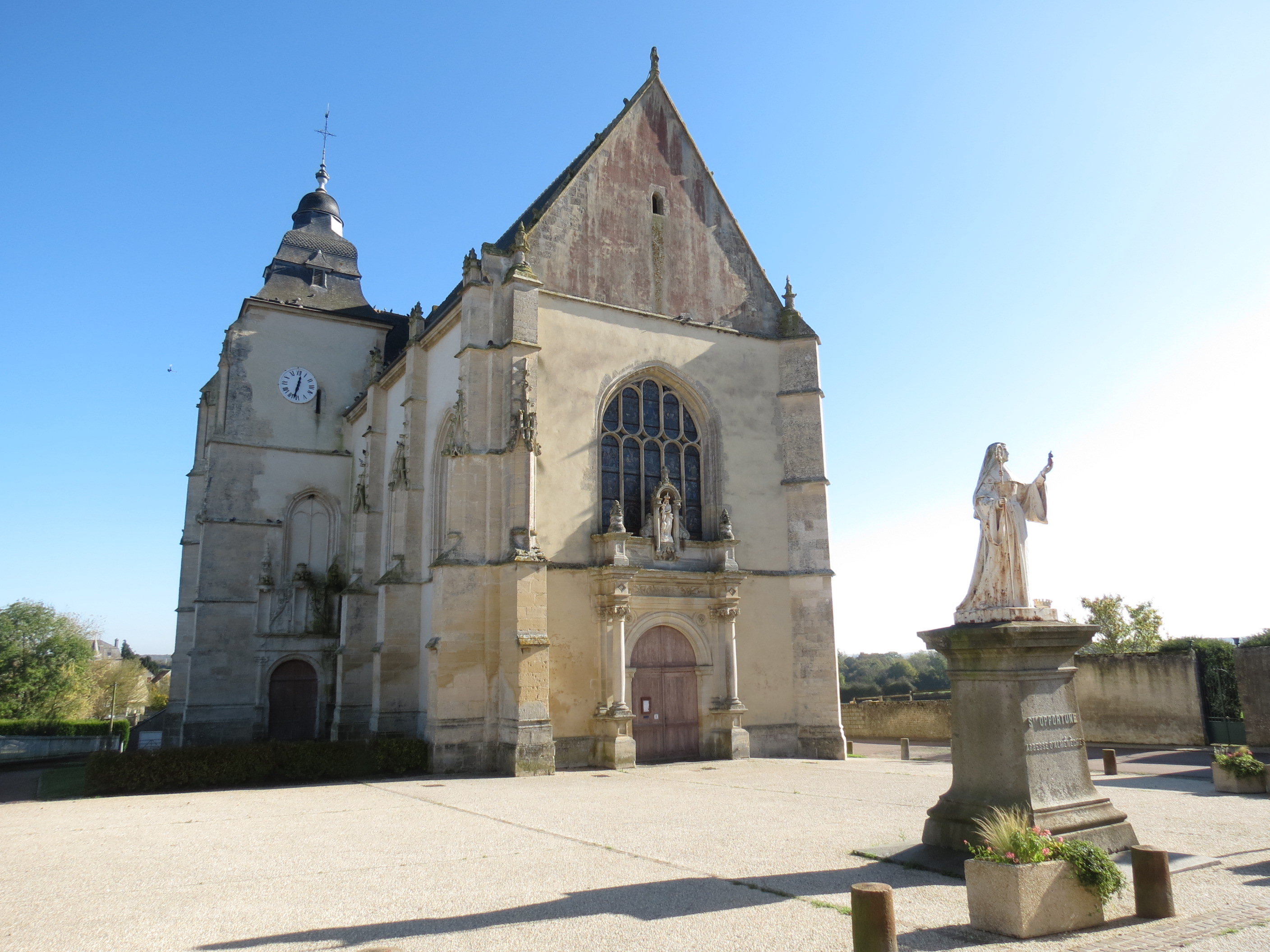
- The church in Almenêches

- Coat of arms
- Location of Almenêches
- Location within France Location within Normandy
- Coordinates: 48°41′54″N 0°06′39″E
- Country: France
- Region: Normandy
- Department: Orne
- Arrondissement: Alençon
- Canton: Sées

Government
  - Mayor (2020–2026): Paul Vinet
- Area^{1}: 20.27 km^{2} (7.83 sq mi)
- Elevation: 171 m (561 ft)
- Highest elevation: 247 m (810 ft)
- Lowest elevation: 158 m (518 ft)
- Population (2023): 638
  - Density: 31.5/km^{2} (81.5/sq mi)
- Time zone: UTC+01:00 (CET)
  - Summer (DST): UTC+02:00 (CEST)
- INSEE/Postal code: 61002 /61570
- ^{1} French Land Register data, which excludes lakes, ponds, glaciers > 1 km^{2} (0.386 sq mi or 247 acres) and river estuaries.

Almenêches (French pronunciation: [almənɛːʃ]) is a commune in the Orne department in north-western France.

== Geography ==
The commune of is made up of the following villages and hamlets, Saint-Hippolyte, Almenêches, Fligny, La Gare, Le Mesnil, Les Champs Bouchers, Le Friche, Surônes and Les Essarts.

The Commune is one of 27 communes that make up the Natura 2000 protected area of Bocages et vergers du sud Pays d'Auge.

Almenêches along with another 65 communes is also part of a 20,593 hectare, Natura 2000 conservation area, the Haute vallée de l'Orne et affluents.

Almenêches has a total of 15 water courses running through it, three rivers Orne, Dieuge and Don. The other twelve watercourses are all streams;

1. la Gironde
2. Fausse Rivière
3. Querpont
4. L'Epinet
5. Noës
6. Essards
7. Essards
8. Essarts
9. Rogneux
10. Calvaire
11. Joncerai
12. Plessis

== Places of interest ==
=== National heritage sites ===
Almenêches church a 16th-century Church that was part of Almenêches Abbey and listed as a Monument historique in 1948.

== Population ==
Historical population
Year	Pop.	±% p.a.
1968	615	—
1975	516	−2.48%
1982	600	+2.18%
1990	660	+1.20%
1999	645	−0.26%
2007	696	+0.96%
2012	689	−0.20%
2017	716	+0.77%
2023	638	−1.90%
Source: INSEE

The inhabitants are known as Almenéchois in French.

== Notable people ==
- Louis-Guillaume Perreaux (1816 -1889) an inventor who submitted one of the first patents for a working motorcycle in 1869, was born here.

== Heraldry ==
Arms of Almenêches	The arms of Almenêches are blazoned : Azure, on a bend argent between an anchor and a mullet Or, 3 ermine spots (palewise) sable.

== See also ==
- Communes of the Orne department
