= Orne =

Department of France

- Department of France
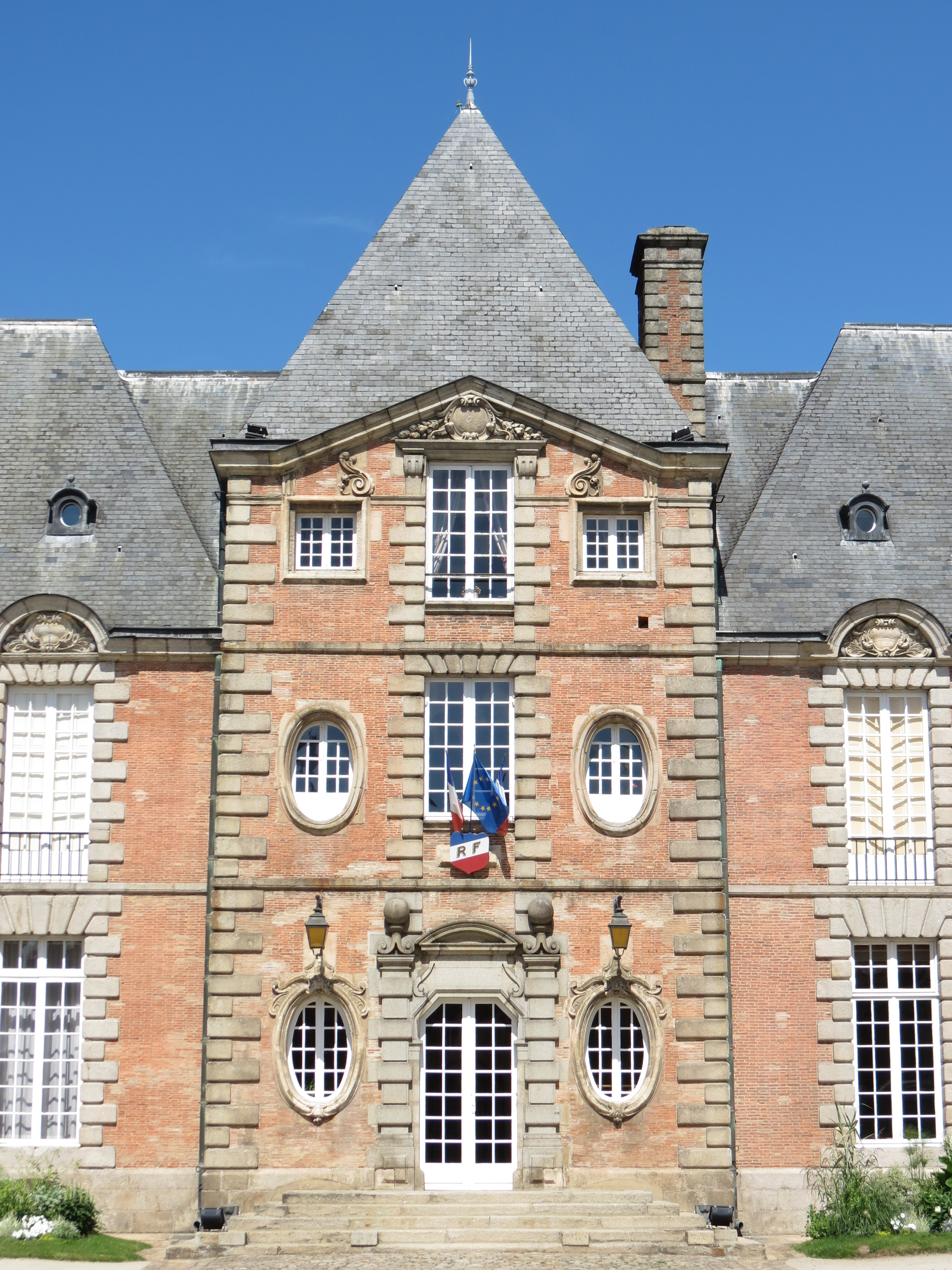
- Prefecture building of the Orne department, in Alençon

- Flag Coat of arms

- Location of Orne in France
- Coordinates: 48°42′N 0°0′E
- Country: France
- Region: Normandy
- Prefecture: Alençon
- Subprefectures: Argentan; Mortagne-au-Perche

Government
  - President of the Departmental Council: Christophe de Balorre

Area^{1}
  - Total: 6,103 km^{2} (2,356 sq mi)

Population (2023)
  - Total: 275,201
  - Rank: 78th
  - Density: 45.09/km^{2} (116.8/sq mi)
- Time zone: UTC+1 (CET)
  - Summer (DST): UTC+2 (CEST)
- ISO 3166 code: FR-61
- Department number: 61
- Arrondissements: 3
- Cantons: 21
- Communes: 381
- ^1 French Land Register data, which exclude estuaries and lakes, ponds and glaciers larger than 1 km^{2}

Orne (French pronunciation: [ɔʁn]; Norman: Ôrne or Orne) is a department in Normandy in the northwest of France, named after the river Orne. Its prefecture is Alençon. In 2023 it had a population of 275,201.

== History ==
Orne is one of the original 83 départements created during the French Revolution, on 4 March 1790. It was created from parts of the former provinces of Normandy and Perche.

After the Battle of Waterloo the department was occupied by the Prussians as agreed in the Treaty of Paris. The area was occupied for three years, during which time the occupying forces pillaged the locals, taking food and money from the locals. The Prussians left in 1818.

During World War II the commune was occupied by the Axis powers. The commune was liberated from its occupiers on 21 August 1944 as part of Operation Overlord, when the final battle of the battle of the Falaise pocket on Hill 262 near Coudehard was won.

== Geography ==
Orne is in the region of Normandy neighbouring Eure, Eure-et-Loir, Sarthe, Manche, Mayenne, and Calvados. It is the only department of Normandy not to border the English Channel.

=== Geology ===
Orne has several different geological areas, firstly in the west of the department is the Armorican Massif, which is an ancient mountain range that has been eroded over time to become granite hills. You then have the flatter plains of the Plaine d'Argentan in the north. To the east of the Plaine d'Argentan you have the rolling hills of the Pays d'Auge. To the far north east is the Pays d'Ouche, which features Chalk Group and Clay-with-Flints soils that are not agriculturally productive. In the South of Orne is the forested area of the Perche.

The Orne department has the highest point in Normandy, called the Signal d'Écouves, located in Fontenai-les-Louvets which is 413 metres in height.

=== Hydrology ===
The 170 km river Orne is the main river that flows through the department, flowing into the English Channel from its source in Aunou-sur-Orne. The Orne forms the Lac de Rabodanges in Putanges-le-Lac, a 6 km artificial lake covering almost 240 acres, making it the largest lake in Lower Normandy.

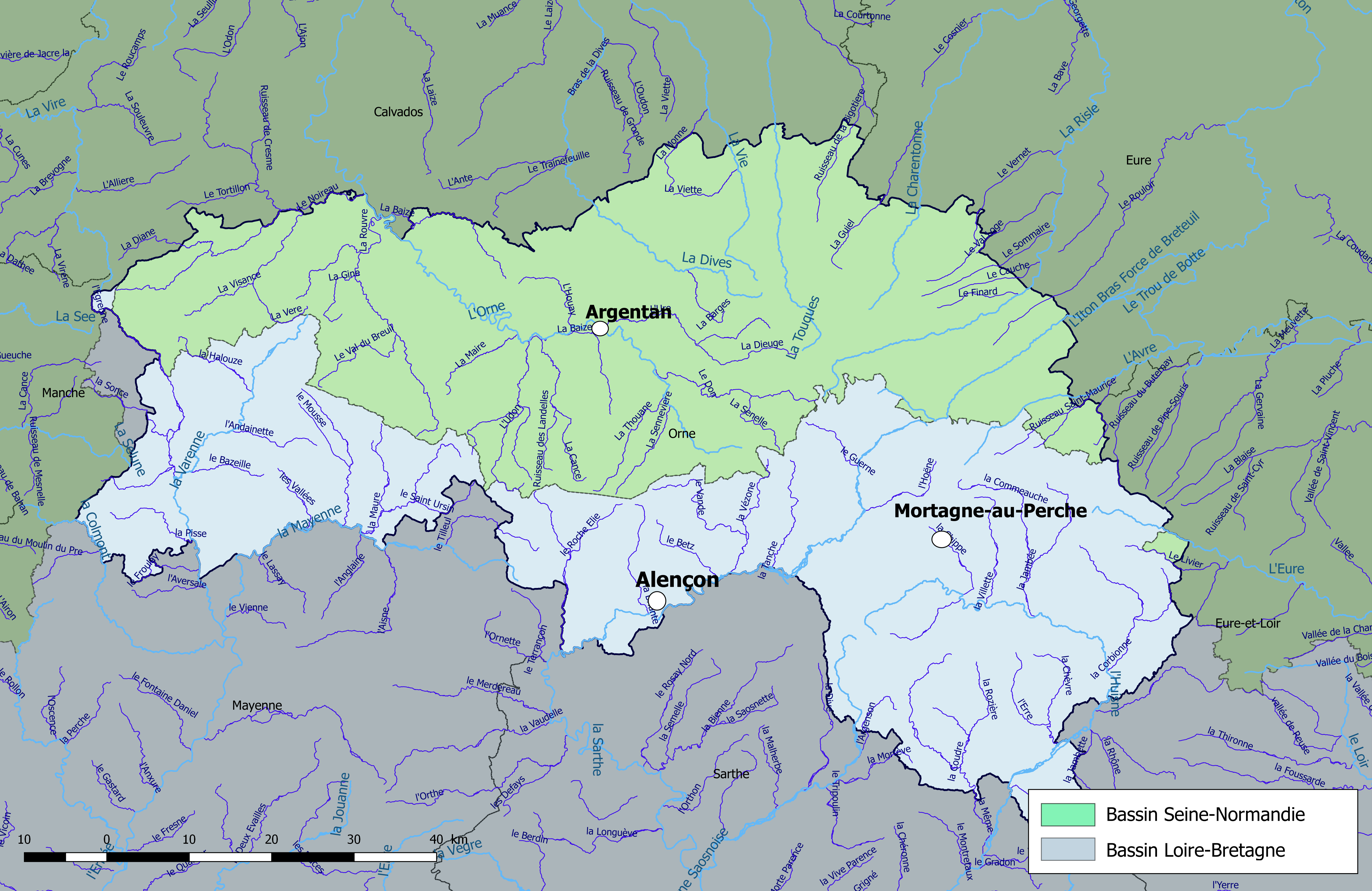
Rivers running through the Orne department

In addition to the river Orne that the department is named after there are a further 16 rivers running through the department that are at least 25 km in length:

1. Avre - 80.4 km long, its source is at Tourouvre au Perche and flows into the Eure near Dreux
2. Baize - 25.72 km long, its source is at Habloville and flows into the Orne at the border between the communes of Les Isles-Bardel and Rapilly.
3. Cance - 25.5 km long, its source is at La Lande-de-Goult and flows into the Orne at Écouché-les-Vallées
4. Charentonne - 63 km long, its source is at Saint-Evroult-Notre-Dame-du-Bois and flows into the Eure near Nassandres sur Risle
5. Colmont - 50.4 km long, its source is at Fougerolles-du-Plessis and flows into the Mayenne near Saint-Loup-du-Gast
6. Dives - 105 km long, its source is at Gouffern en Auge and flows into the English Channel in Cabourg
7. Don - 29.55 km long, its source is at Brullemail and flows into the Orne at Almenêches
8. Huisne - 164.86 km long, its source is at Belforêt-en-Perche and flows into the river Sarthe at Le Mans
9. Noireau - 43.26 km long, its source is at Saint-Christophe-de-Chaulieu and flows into the Orne at Ménil-Hubert-sur-Orne
10. Mayenne - 202.61 km long, its source is at Lalacelle and flows into the river Maine at Angers
11. Risle - 144.72 km long, its source is at Planches and flows into the river Seine at Berville-sur-Mer
12. Rouvre - 45.6 km long, its source is at Beauvain and flows into the Orne at Le Mesnil-Villement
13. Sarthe - 313.81 km long, its source is at Soligny-la-Trappe and flows into the river Maine at Angers
14. Touques - 108.4 km long, its source is at Champ-Haut and flows into the English Channel between the communes of Deauville and Trouville-sur-Mer
15. Udon - 28.24 km long, its source is at Chahains and flows into the Orne at Sevrai
16. Ure - 30.21 km long, its source is at Ménil-Froger and flows into the river Orne at Argentan
17. Varenne - 50.4 km long, its source is at Messei and flows into the Mayenne near Ambrières-les-Vallées

=== Fauna and Flora ===
The orne has 87,000 hectares (210,000 acres) of forests and 17,600 hectares (43,000 acres) of hedges and groves, the forest covers 17% of the department's surface area. Three quarters of the forest trees are Broad leaf based with the other 25% being coniferous.

Orne’s highly rural bocage and forest habitats aren’t home to many strict endemic species, but they do shelter several regionally rare species:

- The bocage ponds and hedgerows support great crested newts (Triturus cristatus) and spotted salamanders (Salamandra salamandra), while the Chalk stream networks harbour the endangered white-clawed crayfish (Austropotamobius pallipes).
- Insect life includes the uncommon violet oil-beetle (Meloe violaceus).
- Woodland flora is typified by mature beech (Fagus sylvatica) and European ash (Fraxinus excelsior) stands on Armorican Massif outcrops, while wet meadows in the Écouves massif host populations of the rare yellow lady’s-slipper orchid (Cypripedium calceolus).

== Economy ==
The largest town by a considerable margin is the prefecture, Alençon, which is an administrative and commercial centre for what is still an overwhelmingly rural department.

=== Employment ===
As of 2025, the Orne has a below unemployment rate of 6.8% compared to the national average of 7.1%.

Most employment within the Orne is in Public sector, closely followed by services as shown in the table below.

Employment by sector of activity
Sector of activity	2011 Number	2011 %	2016 Number	2016 %	2022 Number	2022 %
Together	112,585	100.0	106,440	100.0	106,386	100.0
Agriculture	8,413	7.5	8,153	7.7	7,565	7.1
Industry	21,966	19.5	19,544	18.4	19,583	18.4
Construction	8,651	7.7	7,392	6.9	7,701	7.2
Commerce, transport, various services	37,734	33.5	35,650	33.5	35,579	33.4
Public administration, education, health, social action	35,821	31.8	35,700	33.5	35,959	33.8

=== Production in Orne ===
By far the largest export of the Orne department is dairy products as shown by the table below:

Major exports of the Orne department as of 2024
Category	Export value in (€M) %
Dairy Products	320
Furniture	143
Automotive parts & equipment	134
Precious & other non-ferrous metals	132
Meat & meat products	85.1

=== Food and Drink Production in Orne ===
Orne’s agricultural sector is dominated by dairy and bovine meat, which together account for two-thirds of the total value of farm deliveries. The department has diversified over the past two decades to include poultry, sheep, pork and equine production.

==== Dairy products and cheeses ====
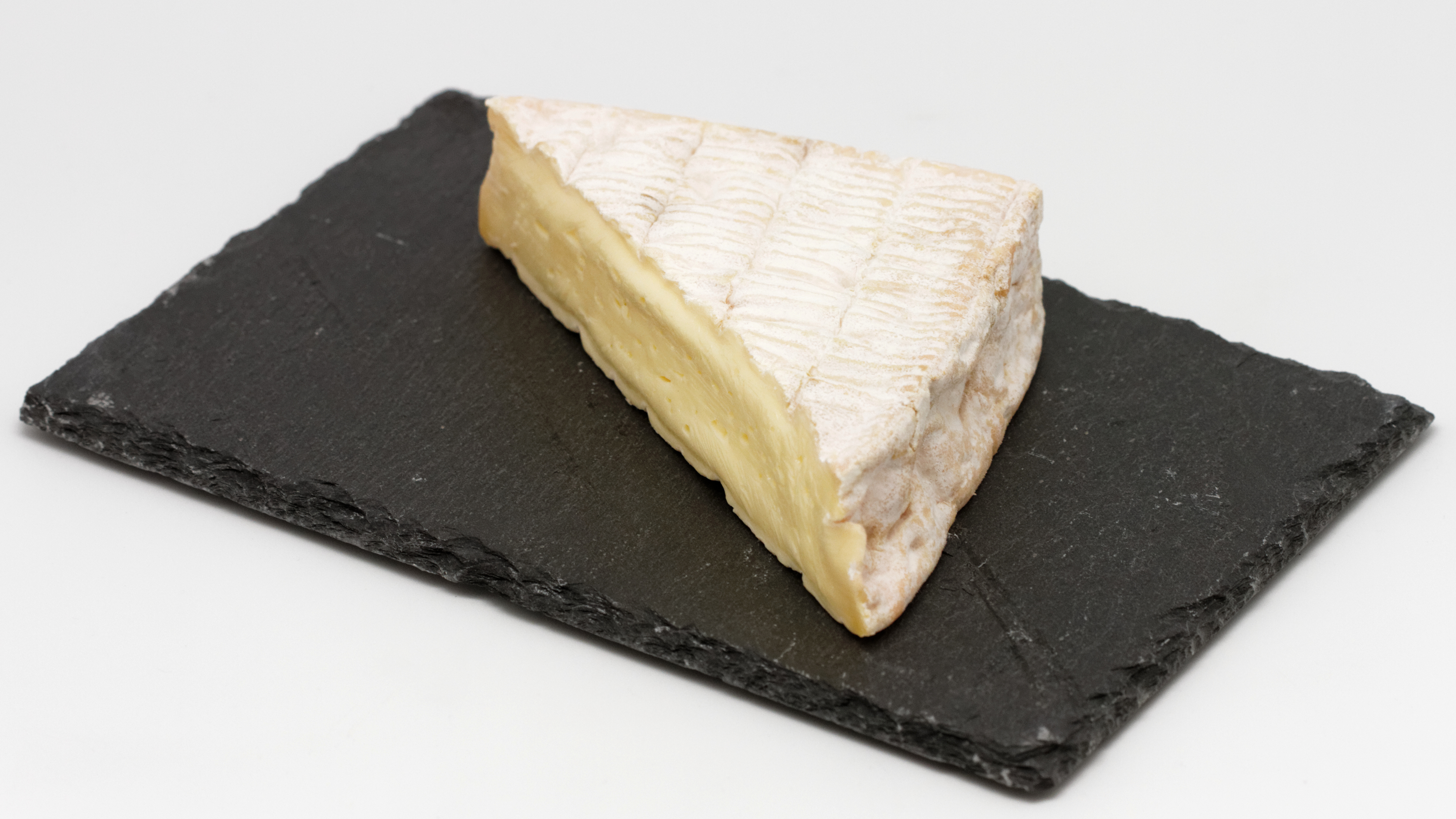
Pont-l'Évêque

- Camembert de Normandie (AOP) - a traditional soft-ripened cheese from Orne made exclusively with unpasteurised milk from Normandy cows, characterised by its velvety white bloomy rind and creamy interior with delicate notes of milk and undergrowth. Its production follows strict AOP rules, including hand-ladling the curd into moulds in five successive layers and a minimum ageing of 22 days before release.
- Livarot (AOP) - a washed-rind soft cheese from the Pays d'Auge in Orne, made with Normande cow’s milk and matured for at least 21 days. It is encircled by five sedge bands—hence its nickname “Le Colonel”, as the rings of dried bullrush resemble the stripes on a colonel's uniform.
- Pont-l’Évêque (AOP) - a traditional soft, washed-rind cheese from Normandy, made from cow’s milk and distinguished by its square shape. It features a supple ivory-coloured paste and a gently reddish washed rind, having been matured for 4 – 6 weeks.

These cheeses are produced by both artisan creameries and larger dairy plants such as Fromageries Gillot in Saint-Hilaire-de-Briouze and Laiterie Fléchard in Rives d'Andaine.

==== Fruit-based products ====
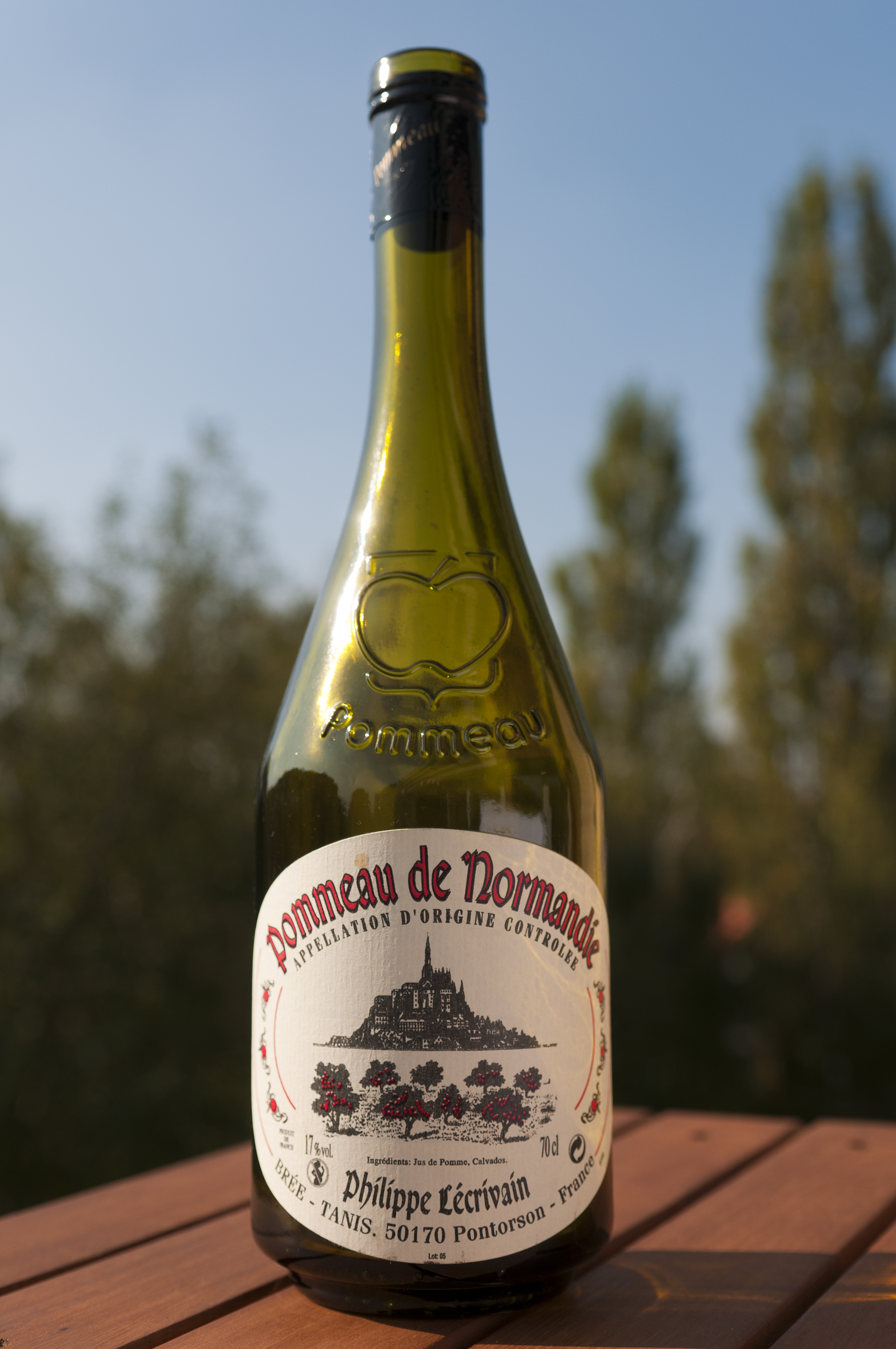
Pommeau de Normandie A.O.C.

- Normandy Cider (IGP) - a traditional apple cider made in Normandy under the EU’s Protected Geographical Indication (IGP - Indication géographique protégée in French) scheme, crafted from a blend of heritage regional apple varieties and fermented slowly to develop its characteristic golden hue, bright acidity and aromatic fruit-forward profile.
- Calvados (AOC) - a traditional Normandy apple (and pear) brandy made from cider pressed exclusively from designated orchard varieties within its appellation area. It must be distilled under INAO regulations and aged at least two years in oak barrels, developing a balance of fresh fruit character and oak-derived spice and vanilla notes.
- Pommeau de Normandie (AOC) - a traditional Normandy aperitif made by mutage of two-thirds Cider apple must and one-third young Calvados, aged at least fourteen months in oak barrels to develop its amber hue and complex aromas of candied fruit, honey and vanilla.
- Poiré de Domfront AOP - a traditional sparkling perry from the Domfrontais region of Orne, crafted exclusively from designated high-stem perry-pear varieties and matured by natural in-bottle fermentation to yield fine effervescence and a delicate bouquet of fresh pear, floral and honeyed notes.

The orchards of Pays d’Auge and Domfrontais supply fruit for pressing, distillation and ageing facilities throughout the department.

== Demographics ==
Historical population

Year	Pop.	±% p.a.
1801	395,738	—
1806	424,669	+1.42%
1821	422,884	−0.03%
1831	441,881	+0.44%
1841	442,072	+0.00%
1851	439,884	−0.05%
1861	423,350	−0.38%
1872	398,250	−0.55%
1881	376,126	−0.63%
1891	354,387	−0.59%
1901	326,952	−0.80%
1911	307,433	−0.61%
1921	274,814	−1.12%
1931	273,717	−0.04%

Year	Pop.	±% p.a.
1936	269,331	−0.32%
1946	273,181	+0.14%
1954	274,862	+0.08%
1962	280,549	+0.26%
1968	288,503	+0.47%
1975	293,523	+0.25%
1982	295,472	+0.09%
1990	293,204	−0.10%
1999	292,337	−0.03%
2007	292,609	+0.01%
2012	290,015	−0.18%
2017	283,372	−0.46%
2023	275,201	−0.49%

The inhabitants of the department are called Ornais in French. The recorded population level peaked at 443,688 in 1836. Declining farm incomes and the lure of better prospects in the overseas empire led to a sustained reduction in population levels in many rural departments. By the time of the 1936 census, the recorded population stood at just 269,331. Once motor car ownership started to surge in the 1960s, employment opportunities became less restricted and by 1982, the population level had recovered a little to 295,000, after which it slowly decreased.

=== Principal towns ===
The most populous commune is Alençon, the prefecture. As of 2023, there are 5 communes with more than 5,000 inhabitants:

Commune	Population (2023)
Alençon	25,490
Flers	14,432
Argentan	13,527
L'Aigle	7,663
La Ferté Macé	5,071

== Politics ==
The president of the Departmental Council is Christophe de Balorre, elected in 2017.

=== Presidential elections 2nd round ===
Election	Winning candidate	Party	%	2nd place candidate	Party	%
2022	Emmanuel Macron	LREM	55.12	Marine Le Pen	RN	44.88
2017	Emmanuel Macron	LREM	61.64	Marine Le Pen	FN	38.36
2012	Nicolas Sarkozy	UMP	52.89	François Hollande	PS	47.11
2007	Nicolas Sarkozy	UMP	57.66	Ségolène Royal	PS	42.34
2002	Jacques Chirac	RPR	81.30	Jean-Marie Le Pen	FN	18.70

=== Current National Assembly Representatives ===
Constituency	Member	Party
Orne's 1st constituency	Chantal Jourdan	Socialist Party
Orne's 2nd constituency	Véronique Louwagie	The Republicans
Orne's 3rd constituency	Jérôme Nury	The Republicans

=== Administrative division of the Orne ===
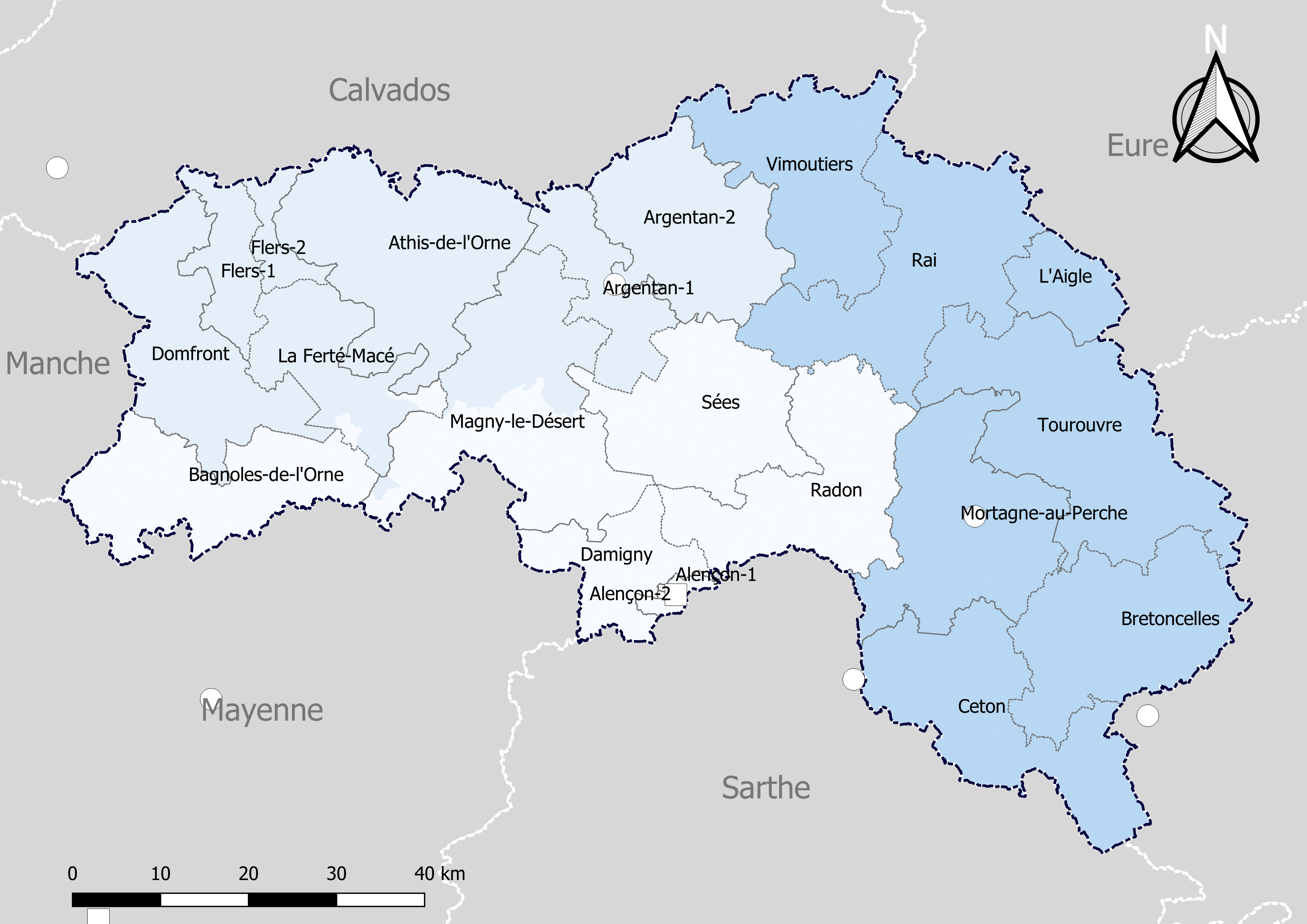
Map of the arrondissements and cantons of the Orne

The Orne has 3 arrondissements, 21 cantons and 381 communes.

- The Arrondissement of Alençon extends over the south and southwest of the department. It comprises 111 communes with an area of 15,458.8 km2, which makes it the smallest of the three districts. As of 2017, it had a population of 86,365.
- The Arrondissement of Argentan extends over the north and northwest of the department. It is organized around Argentan and the northern part of the former arrondissement of Domfront. It is the most populous of the three districts with 123 communes with an area of 1,904.1 km2.
- The Arrondissement of Mortagne-au-Perche extends over the Percheronne part of the department, in the south-east. It comprises 147 communes with a population of 87,392.

== Culture ==
The local dialect used mostly within the Pays d'Auge is known as Augeron.

=== Notable annual events in Orne ===
The following events all attract 15,000 or more visitors each year.

==== Music festivals ====
- Art Sonic: a contemporary music festival held in Briouze since 1996, drawing roughly 20,000 spectators each summer.
- Eskape Festival: a three-day electronic-music festival at Montilly-sur-Noireau inaugurated in 2022, it now attracts over 20,000 attendees.

==== Fairs and gastronomy ====
- Foire Saint-Denis: the oldest and largest popular fair in Orne held the first weekend of October at Montilly-sur-Noireau, covering 8.5 ha with about 700 exhibitors, 100 amusement rides and attracting over 100,000 visitors; documented since the mid-16th century.
- Foire au Boudin: a mid-March culinary fair in Mortagne-au-Perche devoted to La Boudin Noir, featuring tastings, livestock demonstrations, a best Boudin Noir contest by the Confrérie des Chevaliers du Goûte-Boudin and a funfair; Running since 1962 it attracts 27,500 visitors annually.
- Ornexpo: an annual trade fair at Anova in Alençon, showcasing over 130 exhibitors in home, gastronomy, leisure and mobility sectors attracting 15,000 visitors and was first held in 1929 to promote local commerce.
- Foire Saint-Vincent: annual winter funfair held at Argentan’s Champ de Foire each January, featuring about 50 amusement rides, game stalls, local food vendors and a fireworks display; it attracts approximately 85,000 visitors every year and was first documented in 1750

== Sport ==
=== Football ===
The most successful football club in the department is US Alençon, who have previously managed to play in the 3rd tier of the French football league system for a couple of seasons in the 1980s. Two other clubs, Football Club Argentan and Football Club Flérien have managed to compete in the 5th tier of the league system.

=== Horse racing ===
The Orne has eight active racecourses, out of the thirty-two remaining in Normandy; the department publishes a map of them, on which a ninth, at Mortagne-au-Perche, is marked as no longer in use.

- Alençon – in Alençon itself.
- Hippodrome du Pays d'Argentan – the pôle hippique at Urou-et-Crennes, in Gouffern en Auge; it hosts 21 racing days a year, including 12 televised PMU meetings.
- Bagnoles-de-l'Orne – in the department's only spa town, Bagnoles de l'Orne Normandie, on the edge of the Andaine state forest; it races three times each summer, the meetings of 14 July and 15 August being fixtures of the local calendar.
- Hippodrome de la Croix des Landes – at Domfront, in Domfront en Poiraie.
- Hippodrome de la Bergerie – at Ginai, near the national stud of Le Pin.
- Hippodrome Jean-Gabin – at Moulins-la-Marche, named after the actor.
- Rânes – at Rânes.
- Hippodrome de la Fontaine – at Le Sap, in Sap-en-Auge.

The Hippodrome de Mortagne-au-Perche, the only racecourse in the Perche, no longer holds race meetings; the elevations and roofs of its three wooden grandstands have been listed as a monument historique since 1996.

About ten other racecourses have disappeared from the departmental map since the 1950s, at L'Aigle, Sées, Francheville, Trun, Mortrée, La Ferté-Macé, La Chapelle-Moche in La Chapelle-d'Andaine, Briouze, Nonant-le-Pin and Le Merlerault.

== Transport ==
=== Road ===
The department of Orne is crossed by two major autoroutes: the A28 (Abbeville–Tours) and the A88 (Caen–A28), linking Orne to Normandy’s principal cities and the national motorway network.

=== Rail ===
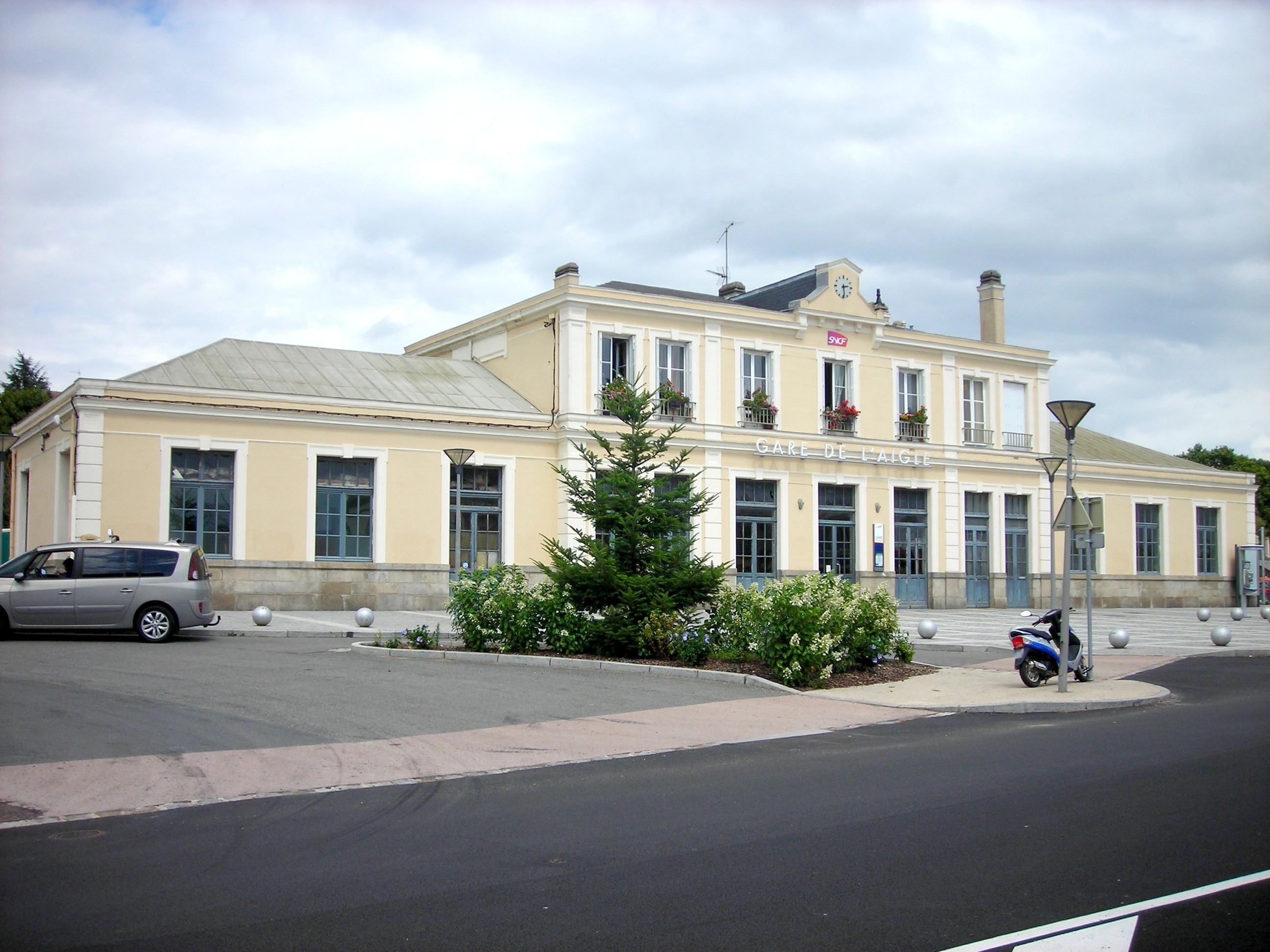
L'Aigle station

Orne is served by SNCF TER Normandie on the Paris–Granville line (via Argentan, Briouze and Flers) and the Alençon–Caen connection. The department has 13 train stations:

1. Alençon station
2. Argentan station
3. Bretoncelles
4. Briouze station
5. Écouché-les-Vallées
6. Flers station
7. L'Aigle station
8. Merlerault-le-Pin
9. Sablons-sur-Huisne
10. Sainte-Gauburge-Sainte-Colombe
11. Sées station
12. Surdon station
13. Val-au-Perche

=== Bus ===
Interurban bus services in Orne are operated by Nomad Car 61, which runs 25 year-round lines linking major communes and school circuits. Urban networks include Alto in Alençon, Nemus in Flers, Argentan Intercom Mobilité in Argentan and Bus Urbain in Bagnoles-de-l’Orne.

=== Air ===
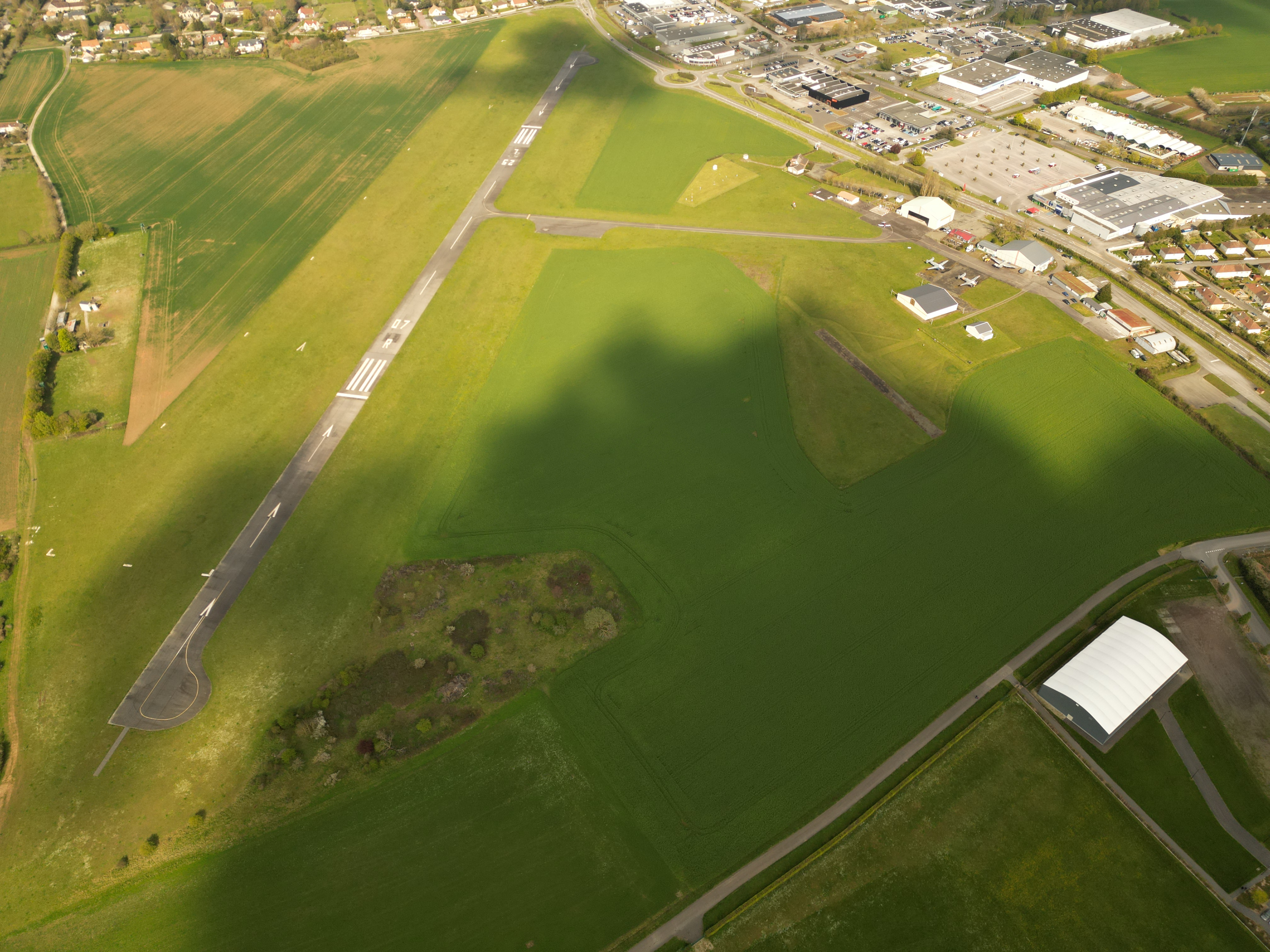
Aérodrome d'Alençon - Valframbert

Orne has no airport with scheduled commercial flights; the nearest airports offering domestic and seasonal international services are Caen–Carpiquet and Deauville–Normandie in neighbouring departments.

The department has six airfields that are used for private planes:

1. Aérodrome d'Argentan based in Argentan
2. Couterne Airport, also known as L'aérodrome de Bagnoles-de-l'Orne, based in Rives d'Andaine.
3. Aérodrome d'Alençon - Valframbert based in Valframbert.
4. L'aérodrome Flers-Saint-Paul situated in La Lande-Patry.
5. Aérodrome de L'Aigle - Saint-Michel located in Saint-Sulpice-sur-Risle.
6. Aérodrome de Mortagne-au-Perche which is spread over two communes Saint-Hilaire-le-Châtel & Saint-Langis-lès-Mortagne.

== Tourism ==
=== Overview ===
Tourism in the Orne department centres on its rural heritage, bocage landscapes and cultural landmarks. As of 1 January 2023 the department offered 63 hotels with 1 328 rooms, 30 campsites with 1 477 pitches and 2 806 additional bed places in collective accommodations such as holiday villages and hostels.

The sector attracts over 6.2 million overnight stays annually, sustains around 1 500 direct and indirect jobs and generates approximately €200 million in direct economic turnover each year.

=== Heritage sites ===
- Haras national du Pin: France’s oldest national stud farm, nicknamed the “Versailles of the horse” for its 18th-century architecture and historic breeding programme.
- Château de Carrouges: 17th-century moated castle with formal gardens and a collection of Renaissance furniture.
- Château d’Ô: 17th-century moated château blending Gothic and Renaissance elements, near Mortrée.
- Mémorial de Montormel: battlefield museum commemorating the Falaise pocket battle of August 1944.
- Château de Domfront: remains of a castle that has stood in Domfront since 1051.
- Abbey of Saint-Evroul: a former Benedictine abbey built around 1050.
- Sées Cathedral: Gothic cathedral dating from the 13th and 14th century.
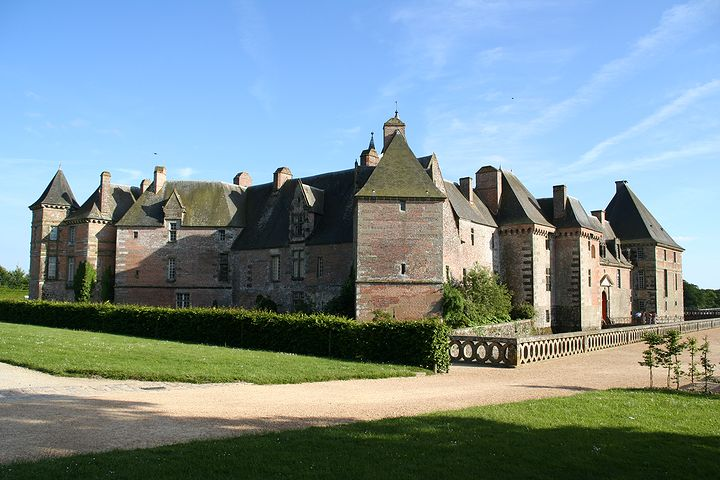
Château de Carrouges

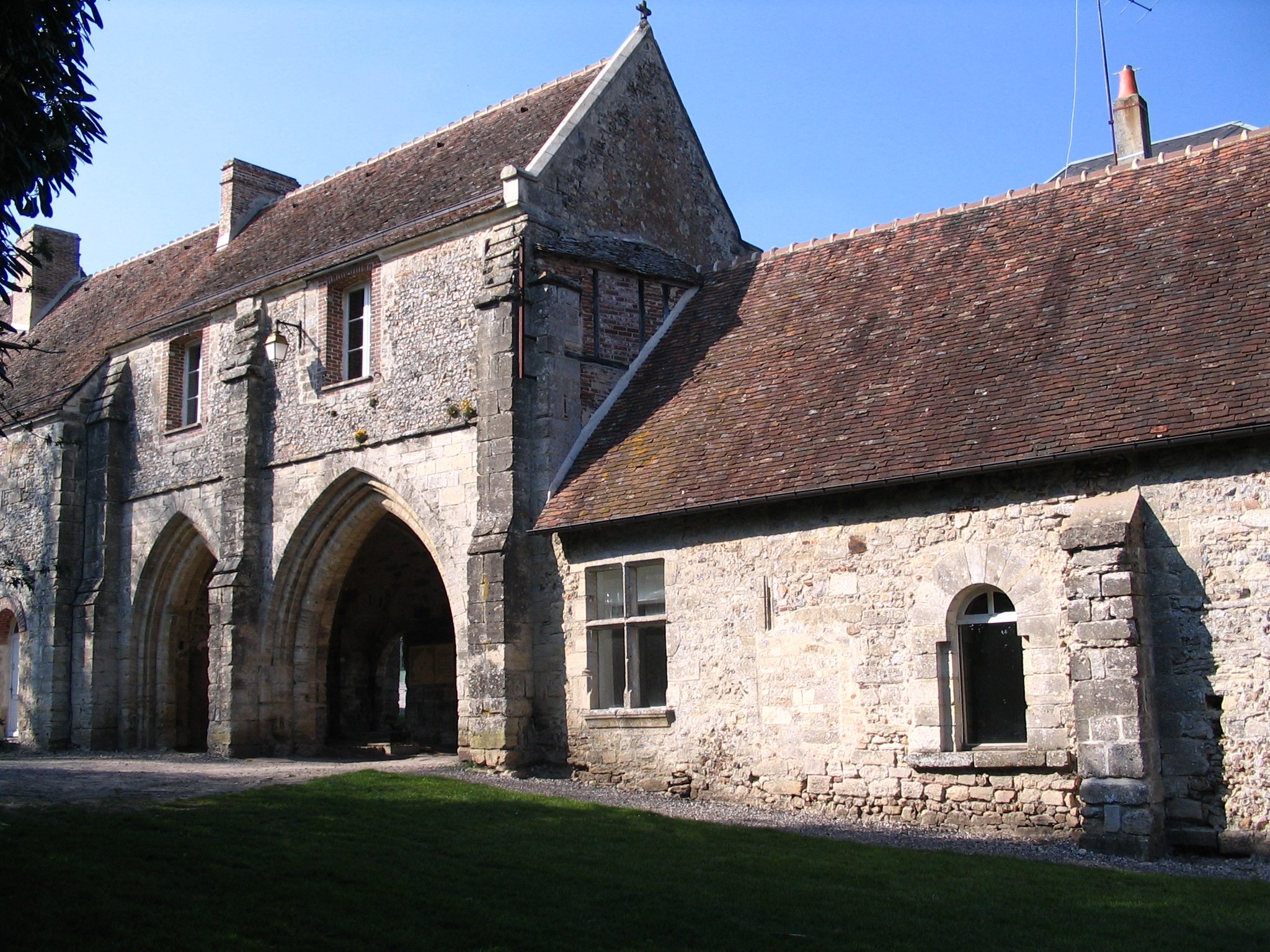
Abbey of Saint-Evroult-Notre-Dame-du-Bois

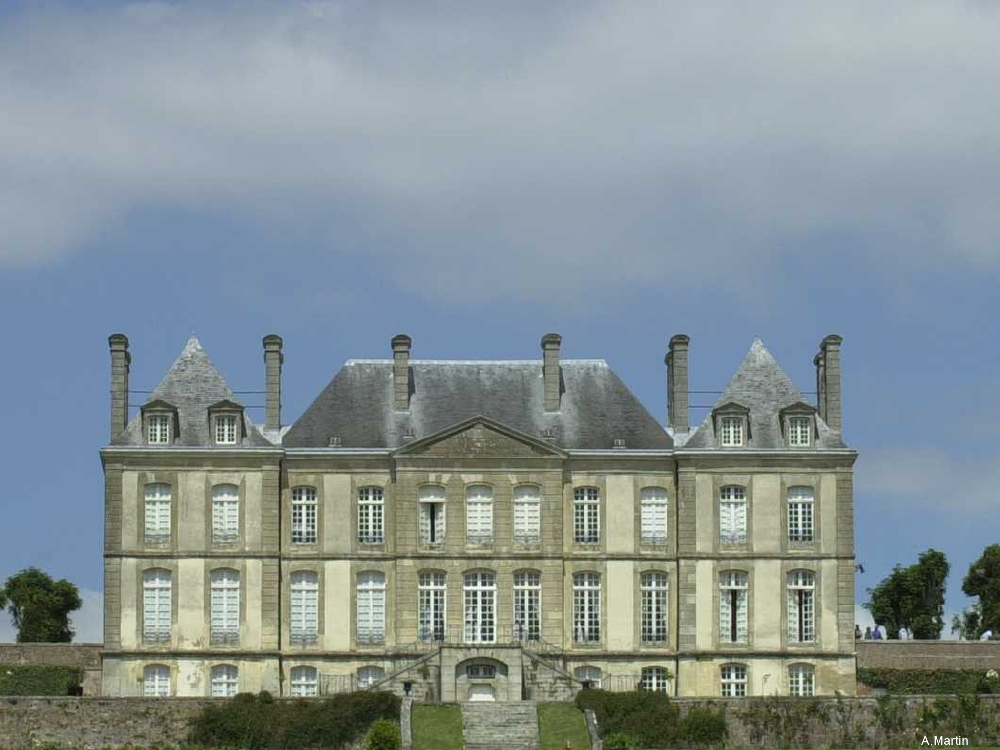
Haras national du Pin

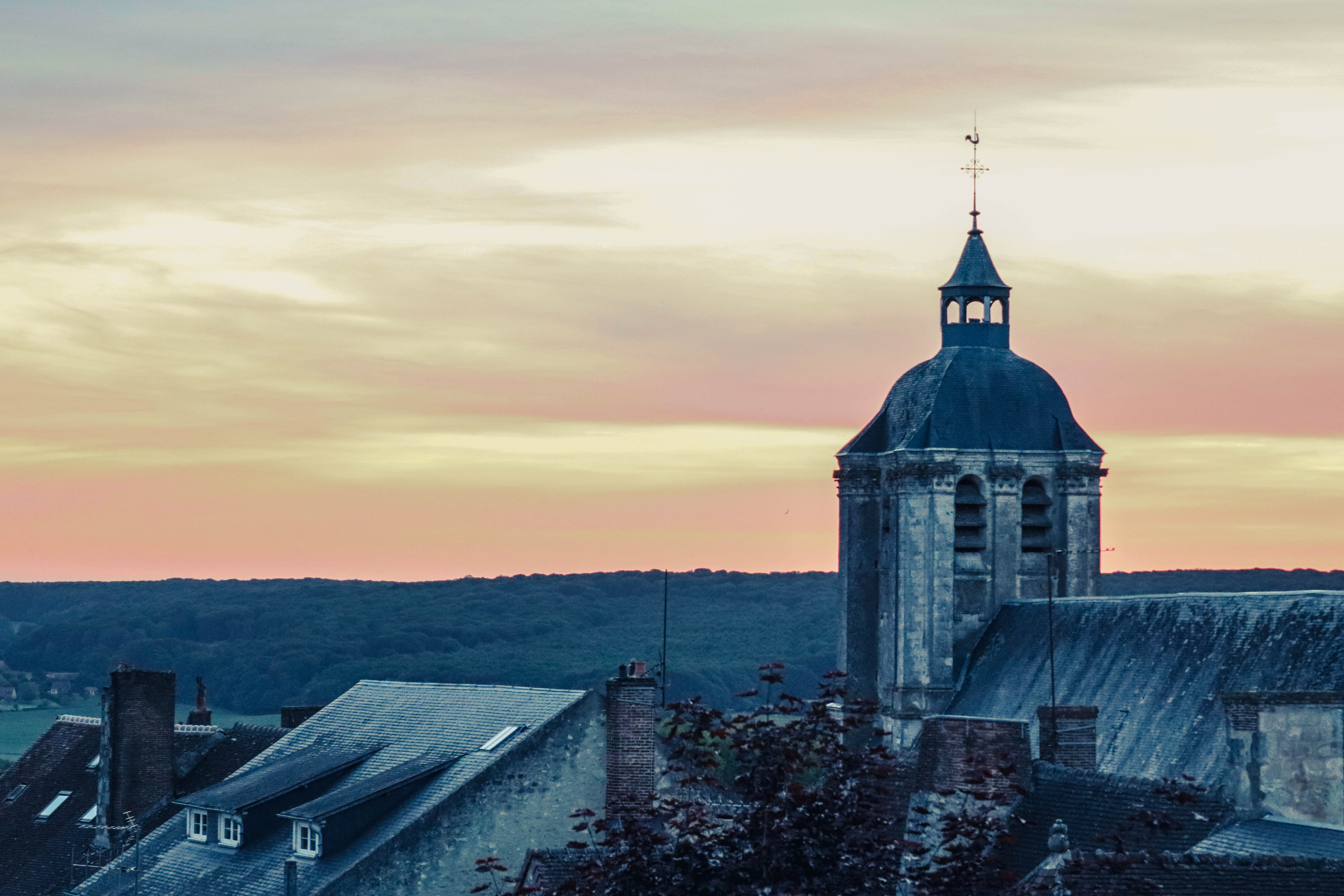
Saint-Sauveur de Bellême Church

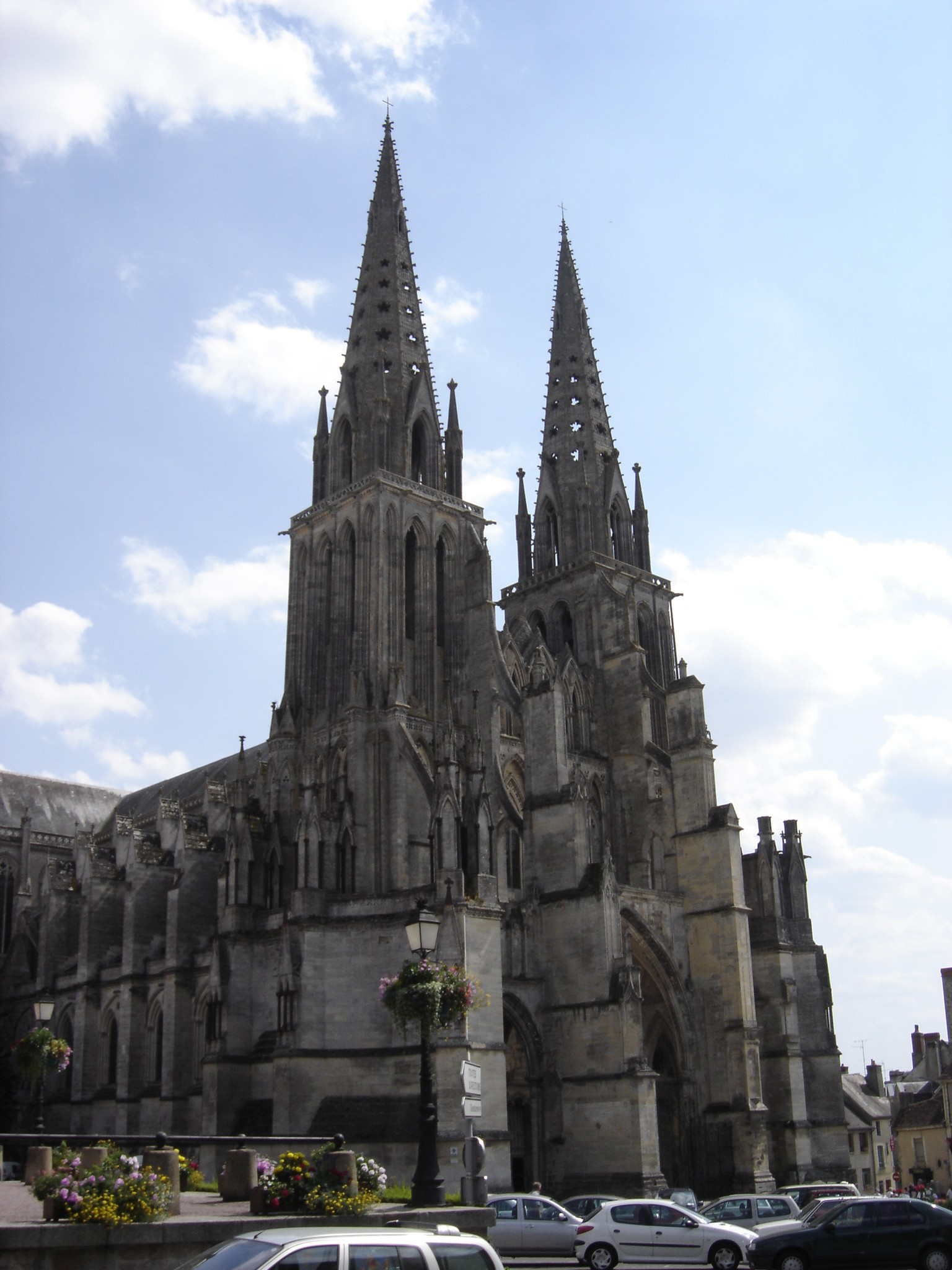
Sées Cathedral

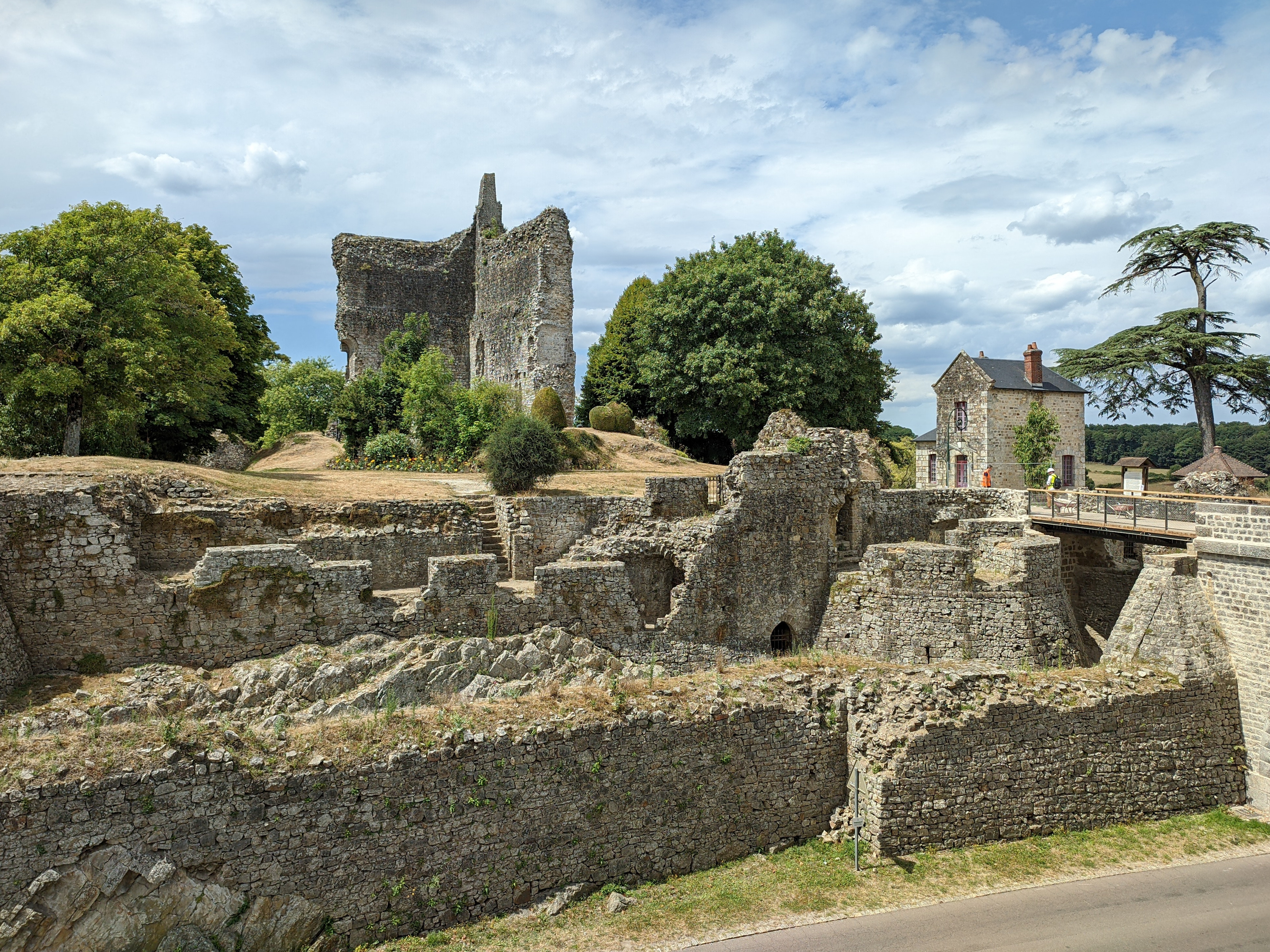
Château de Domfront

=== Museums ===
- Maison natale de Sainte Thérèse, Alençon: preserved birthplace of Saint Thérèse of Lisieux, with museum and basilica complex.
- Musée des Beaux-arts et de la Dentelle d'Alençon, Alençon: exhibits the region’s famed needlepoint lace alongside fine-arts collections.
- Museum of Fernand Léger – André Mare: Museum dedicated to Fernand Léger and André Mare, two major 20th century artists from Argentan
- Museum of the liberation of Berjou: retraces the fighting of 15, 16 and 17 August 1944 around the River Noireau as part of the battle of the Falaise pocket.

=== Gardens ===
- Parc du Château de Lorière is an English styled landscaped park in Val-au-Perche classified as a Jardins remarquables .
- Domaine du Champ de la Pierre is a Pre-romantic park based in Le Champ-de-la-Pierre, and classified as a Jardins remarquables.
- Jardin François in Perche en Nocé is another Jardins remarquables.
- La Petite Rochelle a one-hectare botanical garden and Jardins remarquables located in Rémalard en Perche.
- Jardins du manoir de La Boisnerie a Jardins remarquables built around the ruins of the estate in Sainte-Honorine-la-Chardonne.
- Les jardins de Montperthuis - a rose garden in Chemilli that is classed as a Jardins remarquables.
- Jardin Intérieur à Ciel Ouvert a contemporary garden in Athis-Val de Rouvre classed as a Jardins remarquables.
- Botanical Garden of Le Bois du Puits is a botanical garden featuring over 2,000 species of plants, based in Belforêt-en-Perche.
- Domaine du château de Sassy gardens designed by Achille Duchêne for the château de Sassy in Boischampré classified as a Jardins remarquables.
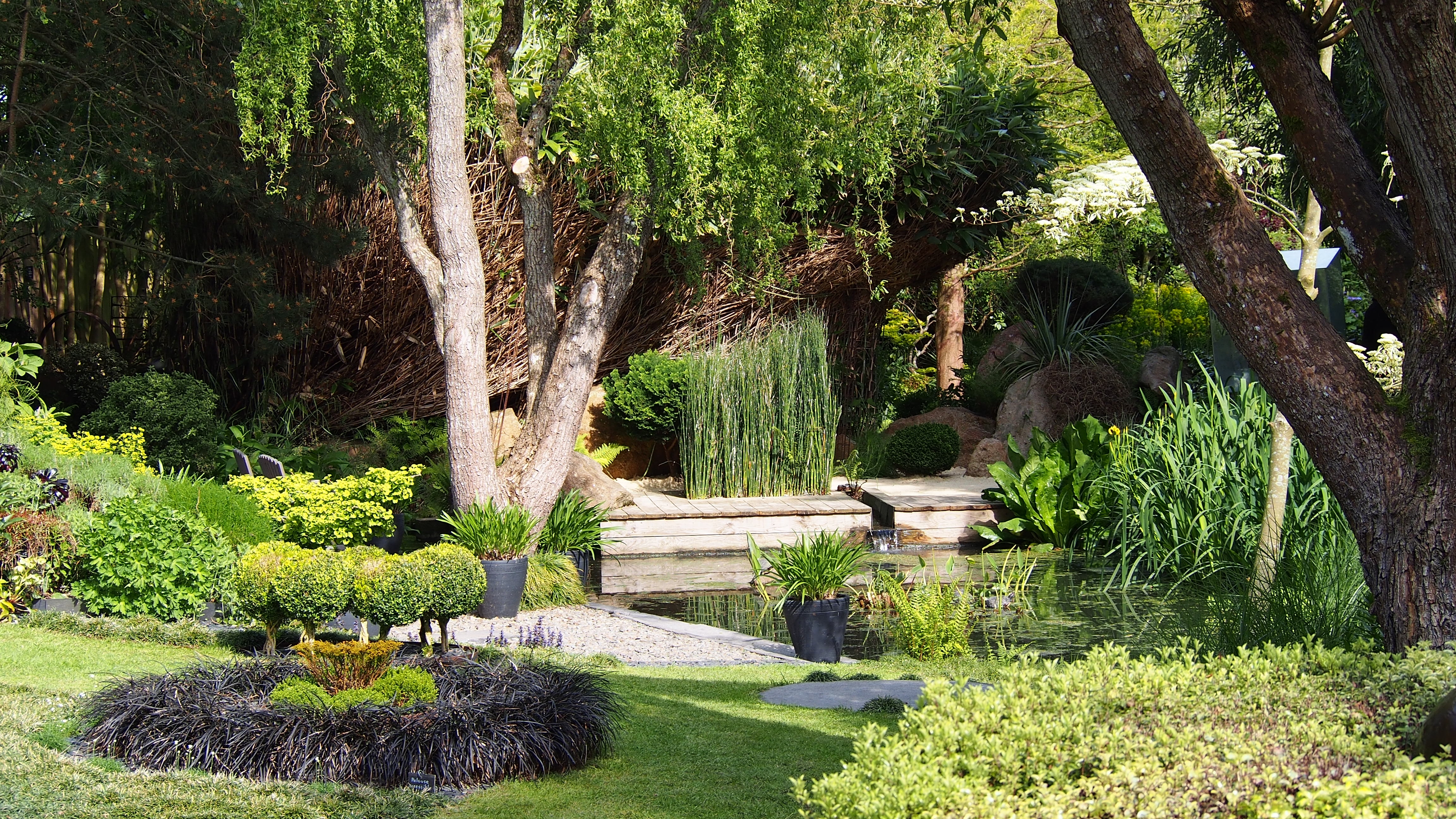
Jardin Interieur A Ciel ouvert

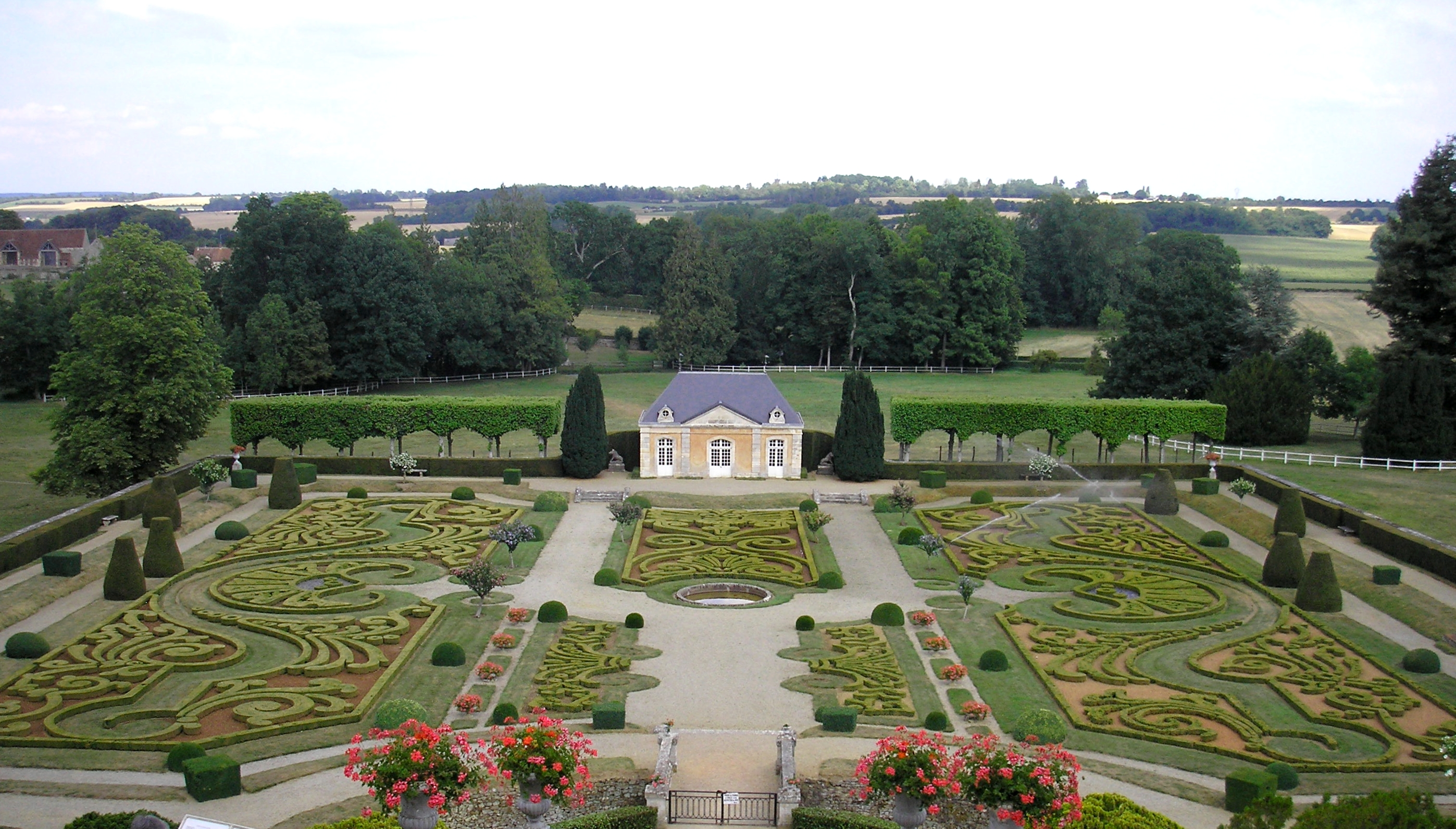
Domaine du château de Sassy

=== Towns and villages ===
- Alençon and Argentan: historic centres renowned for lace-making
- Domfront and Mortagne-au-Perche: medieval hilltop fortified towns with half-timbered streets.
- Saint-Céneri-le-Gérei: listed among “France’s most beautiful villages” for their picturesque setting and heritage houses.
- Bagnoles-de-l'Orne: spa resort town set within the Normandie-Maine Regional Natural Park.
- Camembert: village where Camembert cheese was first created, which has a museum dedicated to the cheese.

=== Natural areas ===
- Normandie-Maine Regional Natural Park: over 270 km² of hedged farmland, heath and mixed forest.
- Perche Regional Natural Park: bocage countryside dotted with manors, woodlands and marked trails.
- Forêt d'Écouves and Forêt des Andaines: cover more than 20 000 ha, with way-marked paths to the Signal d’Écouves (413 m) and lakeside spa at Bagnoles-de-l’Orne.
- Alpes Mancelles: a 1,190-hectare Natura 2000 protected natural region of steep scree slopes, rock outcrops, riparian forests and wet meadows spanning five communes across the Orne, Sarthe and Mayenne departments.
- Suisse Normande: dramatic river gorges and viewpoints such as the Roche d’Ôëtre, plus the Lac de Rabodanges (240 ha) in Putanges-le-Lac for swimming, sailing and lakeside walks.
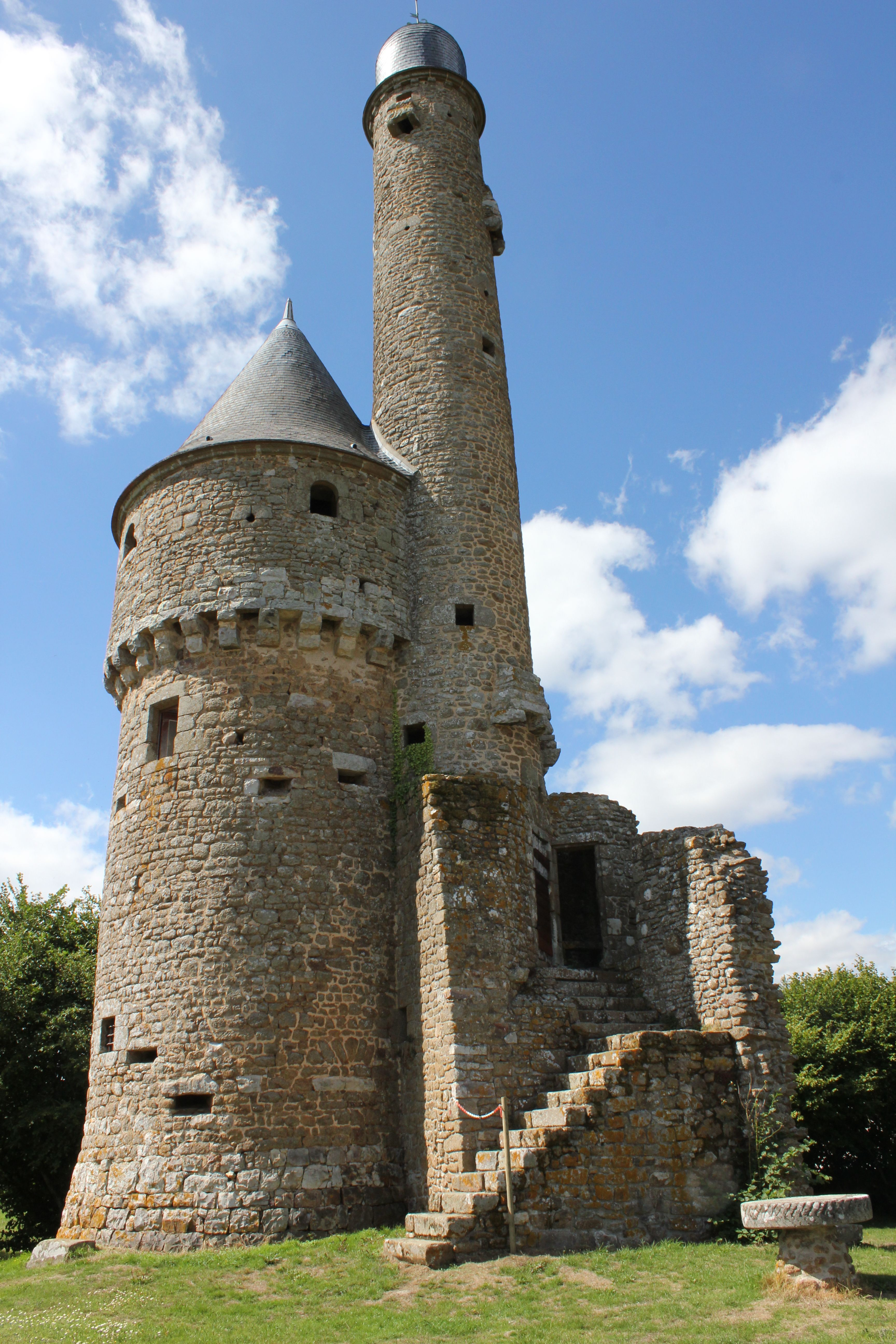
Tour de Bonvouloir in Juvigny Val d'Andaine at the edge of the Forêt des Andaines

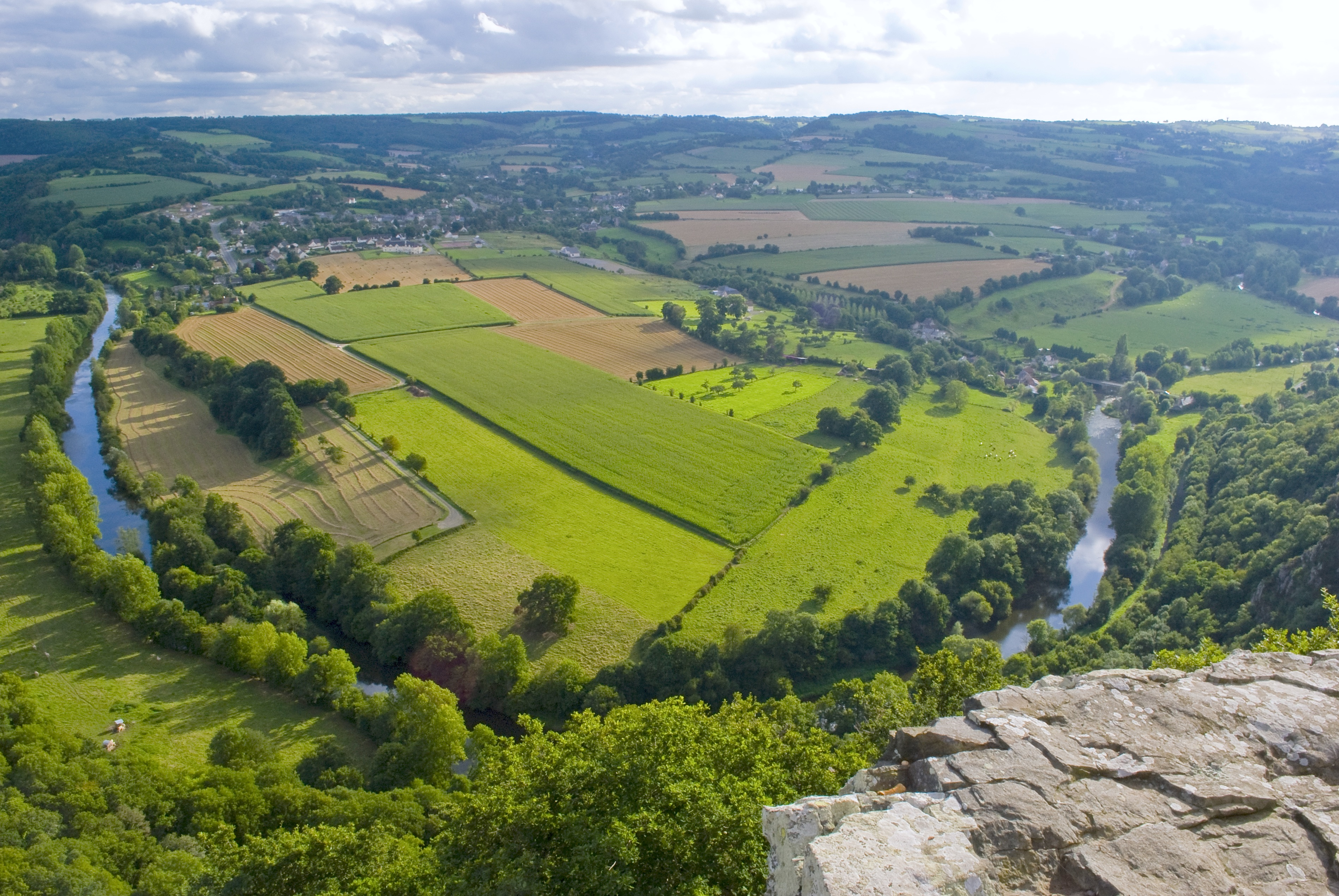
Suisse Normande

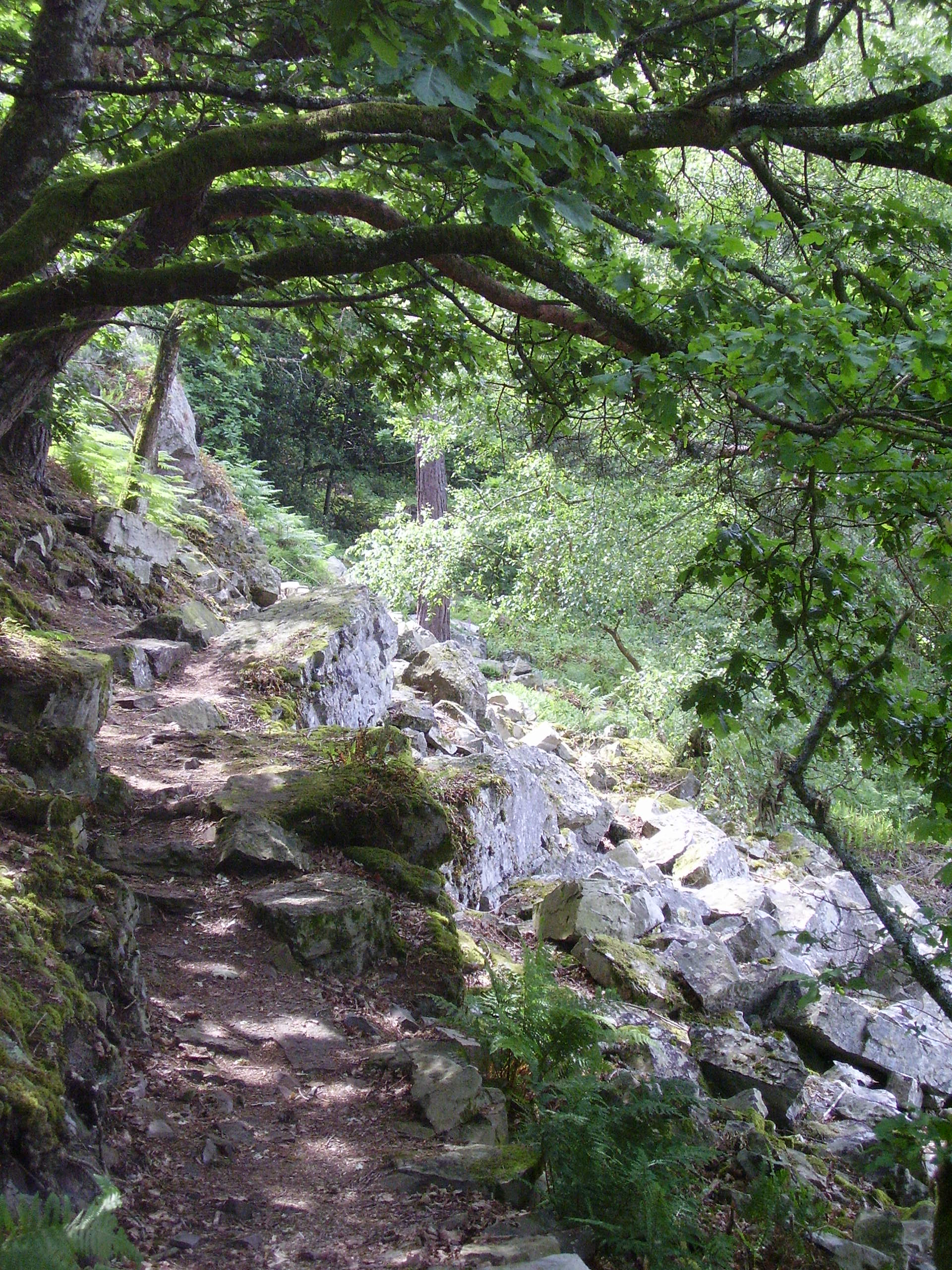
Gorges de Villiers in the Normandie-Maine Regional Natural Park

=== Other attractions ===
- Rustik based in Chailloué, is an immersive amusement park, set in a medieval-fantasy kingdom.
- Biscuiterie de l'Abbaye - is the factory of the Sablé de l’Abbaye biscuit firm based in Lonlay-l'Abbaye and open for tours.
- Parc Animalier d'Écouves is a zoo covering 18 hectares and has over 400 animals in Le Bouillon.

=== Accommodation ===
As of 1 January 2023, the department has the following accommodation facilities

Type	Establishments	Rooms / Pitches	Bed places
Hotels	63	1 328	–
Campsites	30	1 477	–
Other collective accommodations	–	–	2 806

=== Economic impact ===
The tourism industry in Orne records over 6.2 million overnight stays each year, underpins roughly 1 500 jobs across hospitality and related services, and contributes an estimated €200 million in direct annual turnover, making it one of the department’s foremost economic sectors.

== See also ==
- Cantons of the Orne department
- Communes of the Orne department
- Arrondissements of the Orne department
- Haras National du Pin, a French stud farm
