= Ri, Orne =

Ri
- Commune
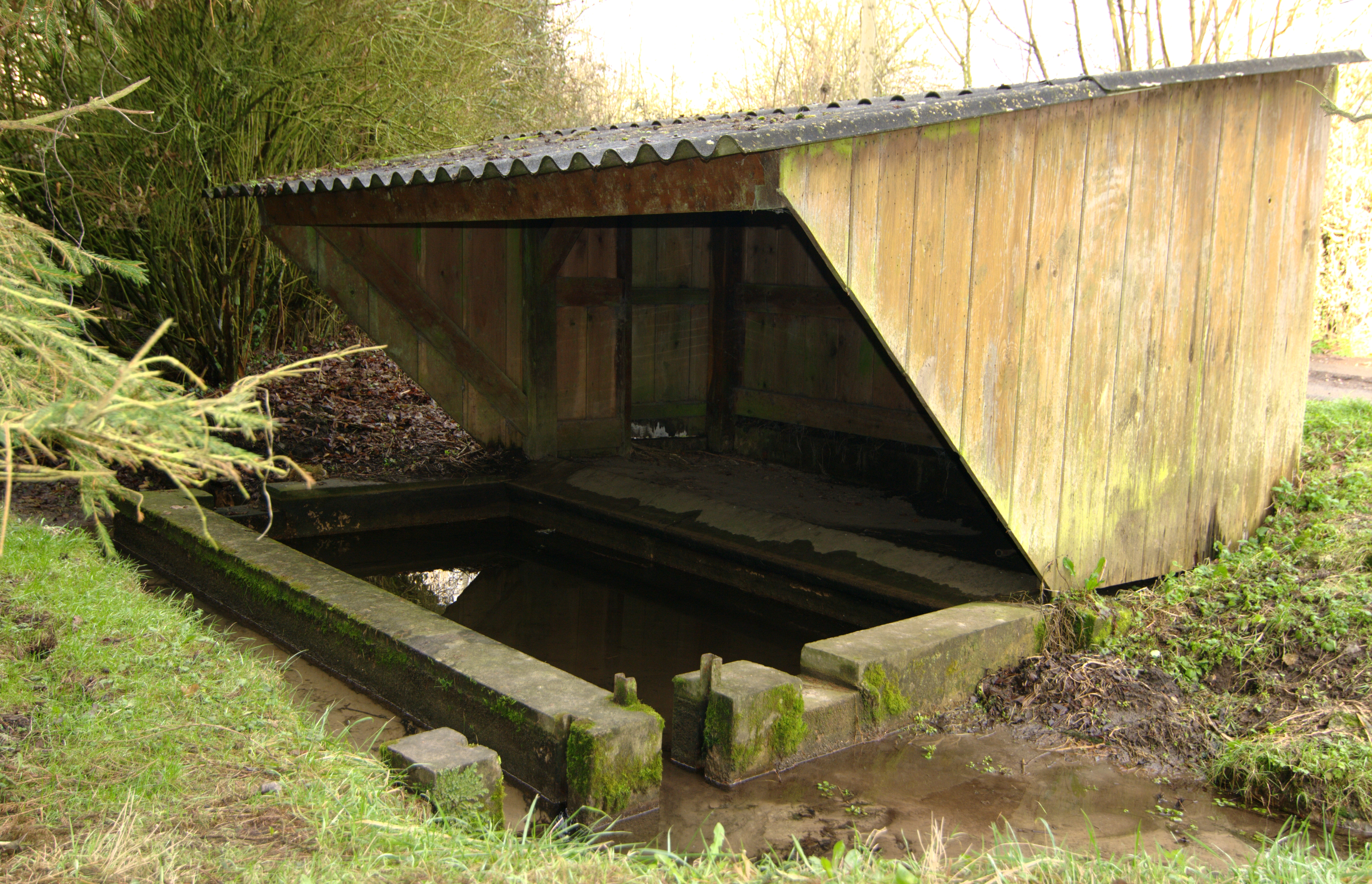
- The wash house in Ri
- Location of Ri
- Location within France Location within Normandy
- Coordinates: 48°47′30″N 0°08′12″W
- Country: France
- Region: Normandy
- Department: Orne
- Arrondissement: Argentan
- Canton: Argentan-1
- Intercommunality: Terres d'Argentan Interco

Government
  - Mayor (2020–2026): Guillaume de Vigneral
- Area^{1}: 7.39 km^{2} (2.85 sq mi)
- Elevation: 200 m (660 ft)
- Highest elevation: 253 m (830 ft)
- Lowest elevation: 177 m (581 ft)
- Population (2023): 155
  - Density: 21.0/km^{2} (54.3/sq mi)
- Time zone: UTC+01:00 (CET)
  - Summer (DST): UTC+02:00 (CEST)
- INSEE/Postal code: 61349 /61210
- ^{1} French Land Register data, which excludes lakes, ponds, glaciers > 1 km^{2} (0.386 sq mi or 247 acres) and river estuaries.

Ri (French pronunciation: [ʁi]) is a commune in the Orne department in north-western France. This commune has the shortest name of any department in the Orne.

Saint John Eudes, the forerunner of the devotion to Sacred Heart, was born here.

== Geography ==
The commune of Ri is made up of the following collection of villages and hamlets, Ri and Houay. The commune is spread over an area of 7.39 square kilometres (1,830 acres) with a maximum altitude of 253 metres (830 ft 1 in) and minimum of 177 metres (580 ft 9 in)

The commune is within the area known as the Plaine d'Argentan, which is known for its cereal growing fileds and horse stud farms.

The source of the river Houay, a tributary of the Orne originates from the settlement of the same name.

Ri along with another 65 communes is part of a 20,593 hectare, Natura 2000 conservation area, called the Haute vallée de l'Orne et affluents.

=== Land distribution ===
The 2018 CORINE Land Cover assessment shows the vast majority of the land in the commune, 67% (495 hectares (1,220 acres)) is Arable land. The rest of the land is Meadows at 16%, Heterogeneous agricultural land at 14% and the remaining 5% (34 hectares (84 acres)) is shrub and/or herbaceous vegetation.

== Points of interest ==
In advance of the construction of the A88 autoroute a Neolithic flint mine was discovered in Ri.

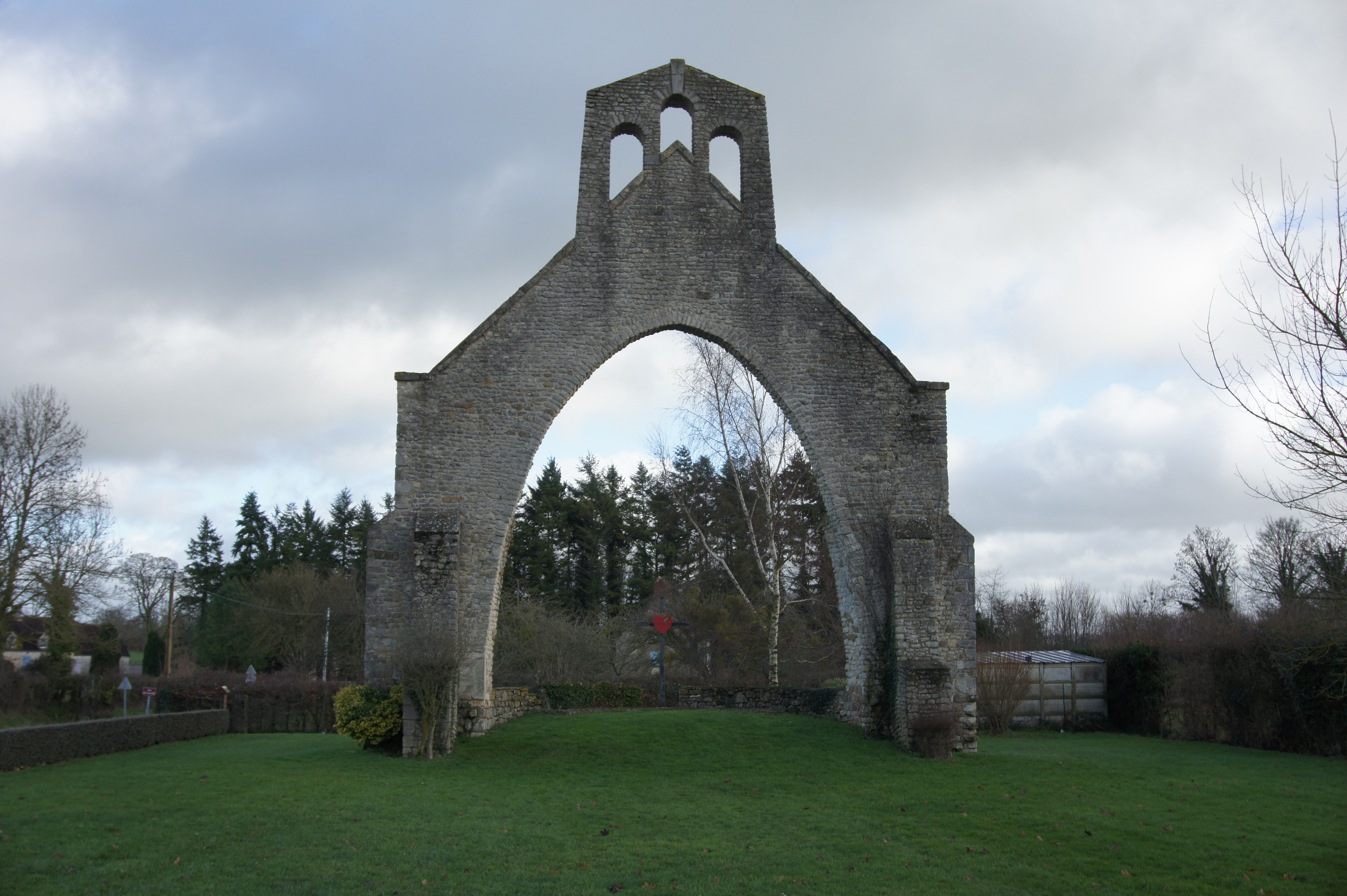
The oratory at Saint-Jean-Eudes, Ri

== Notable people ==
- John Eudes, born in Ri, was a French Roman Catholic priest and the founder of both the Order of Our Lady of Charity in 1641 and Congregation of Jesus and Mary, also known as The Eudists, in 1643.
- François Eudes de Mézeray born in Ri, was a French Historian

== See also ==
- Communes of the Orne department
