= François Eudes de Mézeray =

French historian (1610–1683)

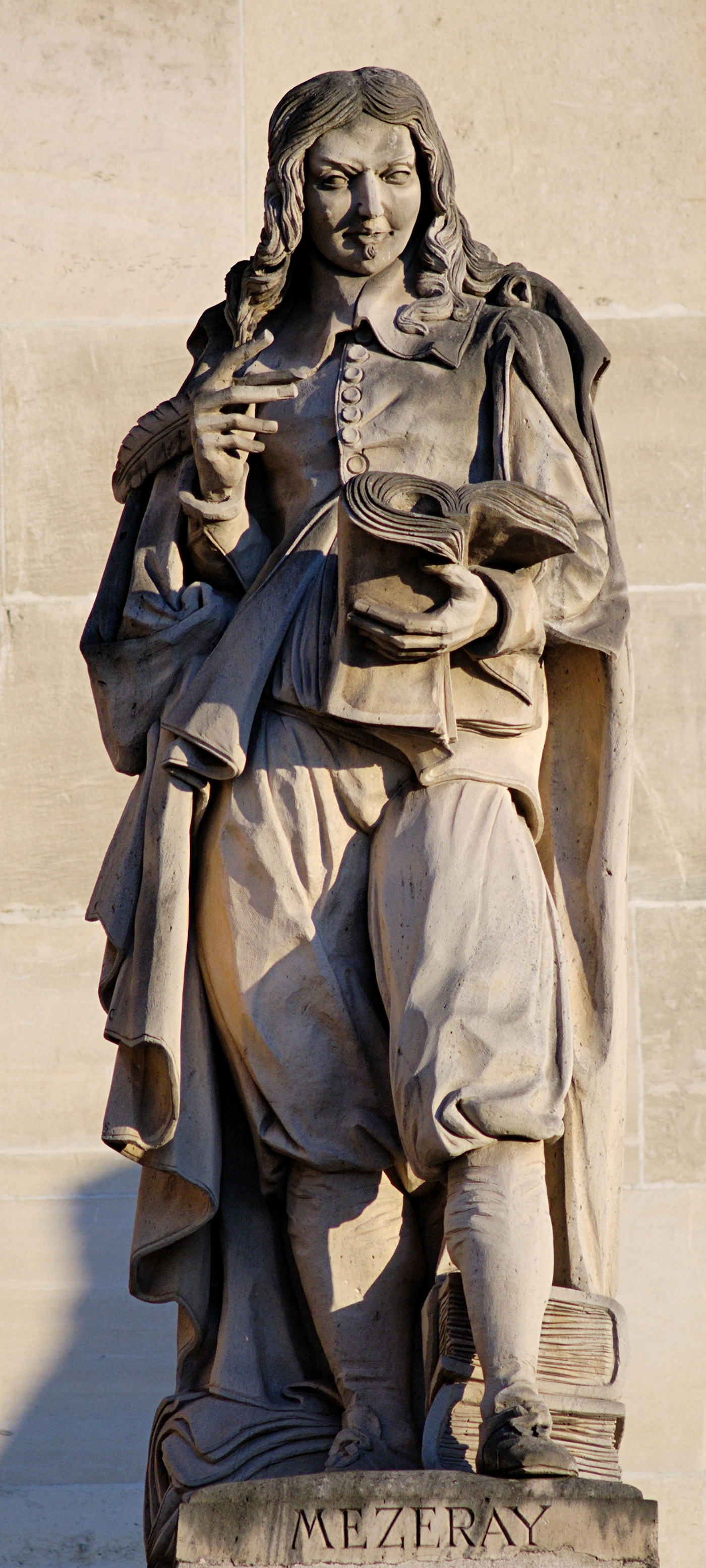
Mézeray by Louis-Joseph Daumas, Cour Napoléon of the Palais du Louvre

François Eudes de Mézeray (1610 – 10 July 1683) was a French historian.

Mézeray was born at Ri near Argentan, where his father was a surgeon. He had two brothers, one of whom, Jean-Eudes, was the founder of the order of the Eudists. François studied at the University of Caen, and completed his education at the College of Ste Barbe at Paris. His Histoire de France depuis Faramond jusqu'au règne de Louis le juste (3 vols., 1643–1651), is a fairly accurate summary of French and Latin chronicles.

Mézeray was appointed to a committee that supervised La Gazette.

Mézeray won the favor of Pierre Séguier and was given the title "Historiographer to the King of France". In 1649, on the death of Vincent Voiture, he was admitted to the Académie française. His Abrégé chronologique (3 vols., 1667–1668) went through fifteen editions between 1668 and 1717; and he used it to attack the financiers, with the result that his salary as historiographer was diminished by Colbert.

Mézeray succeeded Valentin Conrart as permanent secretary to the Académie française (1675), and died at Paris. He translated Grotius's Traité de la religion chretienne (1640), and a Histoire des Turcs depuis 1612 jusqu'en 1649 (1650), which is an addition to a continuation of Laonikos Chalkokondyles.
