= Moulins-sur-Orne =

- Commune
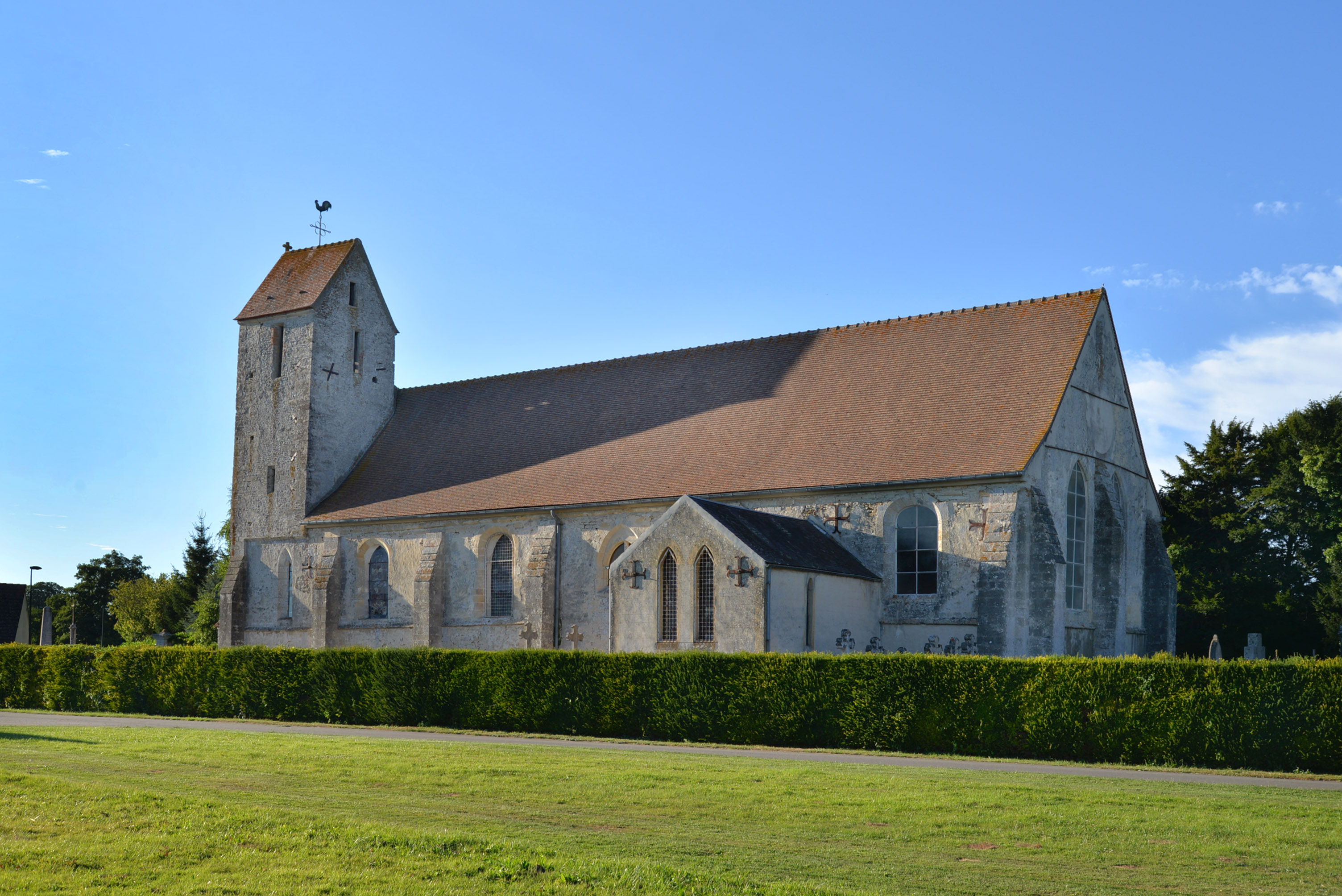
- The church in Moulins-sur-Orne
- Location of Moulins-sur-Orne
- Location within France Location within Normandy
- Coordinates: 48°45′32″N 0°04′17″W
- Country: France
- Region: Normandy
- Department: Orne
- Arrondissement: Argentan
- Canton: Argentan-1
- Intercommunality: Terres d'Argentan Interco

Government
  - Mayor (2020–2026): Roger Ruppert
- Area^{1}: 9.14 km^{2} (3.53 sq mi)
- Elevation: 170 m (560 ft)
- Highest elevation: 191 m (627 ft)
- Lowest elevation: 150 m (490 ft)
- Population (2023): 306
  - Density: 33.5/km^{2} (86.7/sq mi)
- Time zone: UTC+01:00 (CET)
  - Summer (DST): UTC+02:00 (CEST)
- INSEE/Postal code: 61298 /61200
- ^{1} French Land Register data, which excludes lakes, ponds, glaciers > 1 km^{2} (0.386 sq mi or 247 acres) and river estuaries.

Moulins-sur-Orne (French pronunciation: [mulɛ̃ syʁ ɔʁn], literally Moulins on Orne) is a commune in the Orne department in north-western France.

== Geography ==
The commune is made up of the following collection of villages and hamlets, Moulins-sur-Orne, Les Marteaux and Bel œuvre.

The commune is within the area known as the Plaine d'Argentan, which is known for its cereal growing fields and horse stud farms.

Moulins-sur-Orne along with another 65 communes is part of a 20,593 hectare, Natura 2000 conservation area, called the Haute vallée de l'Orne et affluents.

The commune has three rivers running through it, the river Orne and one of its tributaries the Houay, plus a tributary to the Houay, called the Ruisseau des Fontaines Thiot

== Notable buildings and places ==
Jardin de Marigny is an English styled garden of 9000 m^{2} that is occasionally opened to the public. The garden is a member of the Union des Parcs et Jardins de Normandie (Calvados-Manche-Orne).

== See also ==
- Communes of the Orne department
