= Commeaux =

- Commune
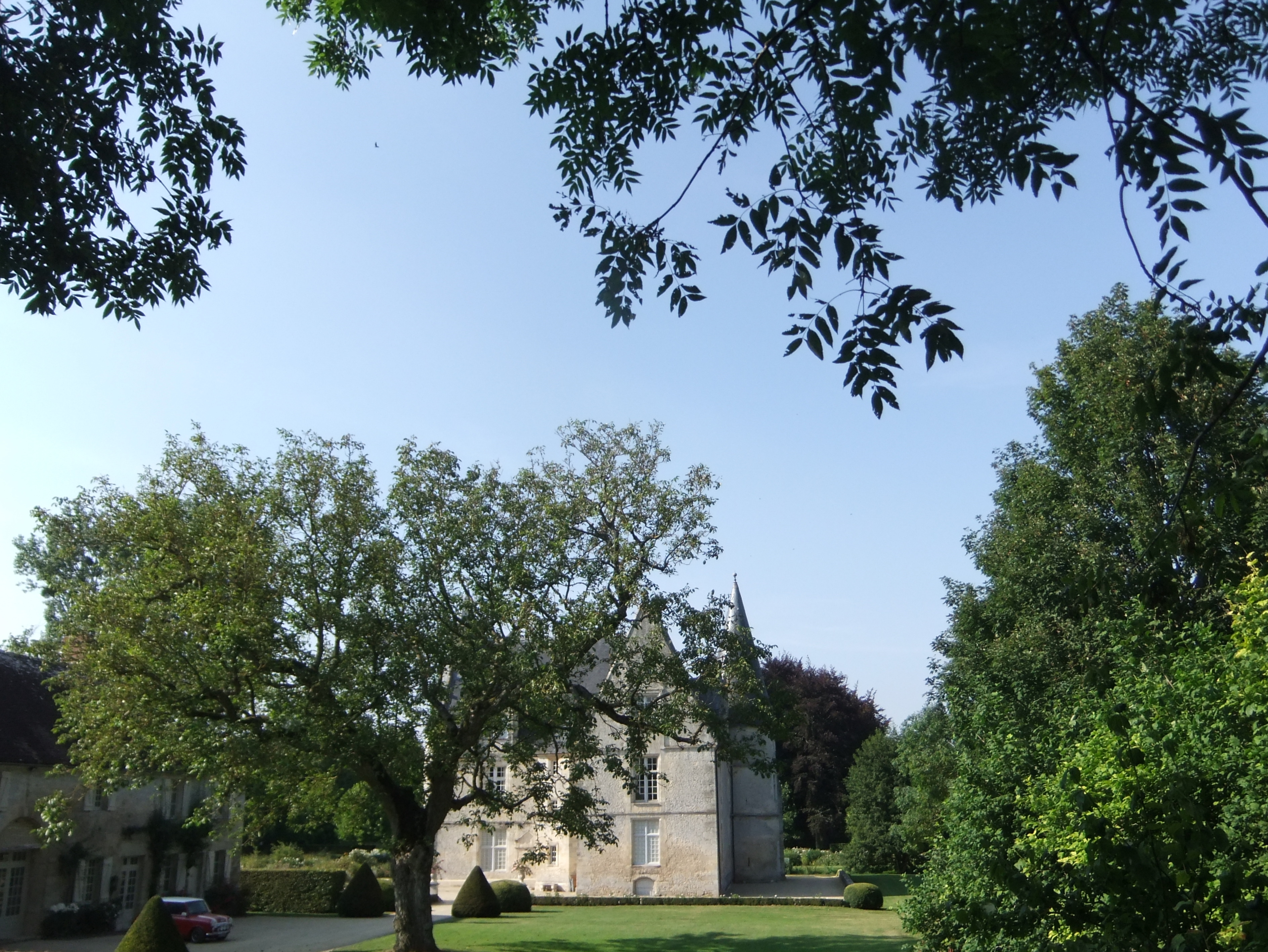
- The manor in Commeaux
- Location of Commeaux
- Location within France Location within Normandy
- Coordinates: 48°47′19″N 0°06′41″W
- Country: France
- Region: Normandy
- Department: Orne
- Arrondissement: Argentan
- Canton: Argentan-1
- Intercommunality: Terres d'Argentan Interco

Government
  - Mayor (2020–2026): Philippe Beauvais
- Area^{1}: 6.38 km^{2} (2.46 sq mi)
- Elevation: 189 m (620 ft)
- Highest elevation: 212 m (696 ft)
- Lowest elevation: 162 m (531 ft)
- Population (2023): 146
  - Density: 22.9/km^{2} (59.3/sq mi)
- Demonym: Commelais
- Time zone: UTC+01:00 (CET)
  - Summer (DST): UTC+02:00 (CEST)
- INSEE/Postal code: 61114 /61200
- ^{1} French Land Register data, which excludes lakes, ponds, glaciers > 1 km^{2} (0.386 sq mi or 247 acres) and river estuaries.

Commeaux (French pronunciation: [kɔmo]) is a commune in the Orne department in north-western France.

== Geography ==
The commune is made up of the following collection of villages and hamlets, Commeaux and Brévaux.

The commune is within the area known as the Plaine d'Argentan, which is known for its cereal growing fileds and horse stud farms.

Commeaux along with another 65 communes is part of a 20,593 hectare, Natura 2000 conservation area, called the Haute vallée de l'Orne et affluents.

The commune has the river Houay running through it, which is a tributary of the river Orne.

== Notable buildings and places ==
- Manoir is a 16th-century manor house located in Commeaux that was listed as a Monument historique in 1963.

== See also ==
- Communes of the Orne department
