= Juvigny-sur-Orne =

- Commune
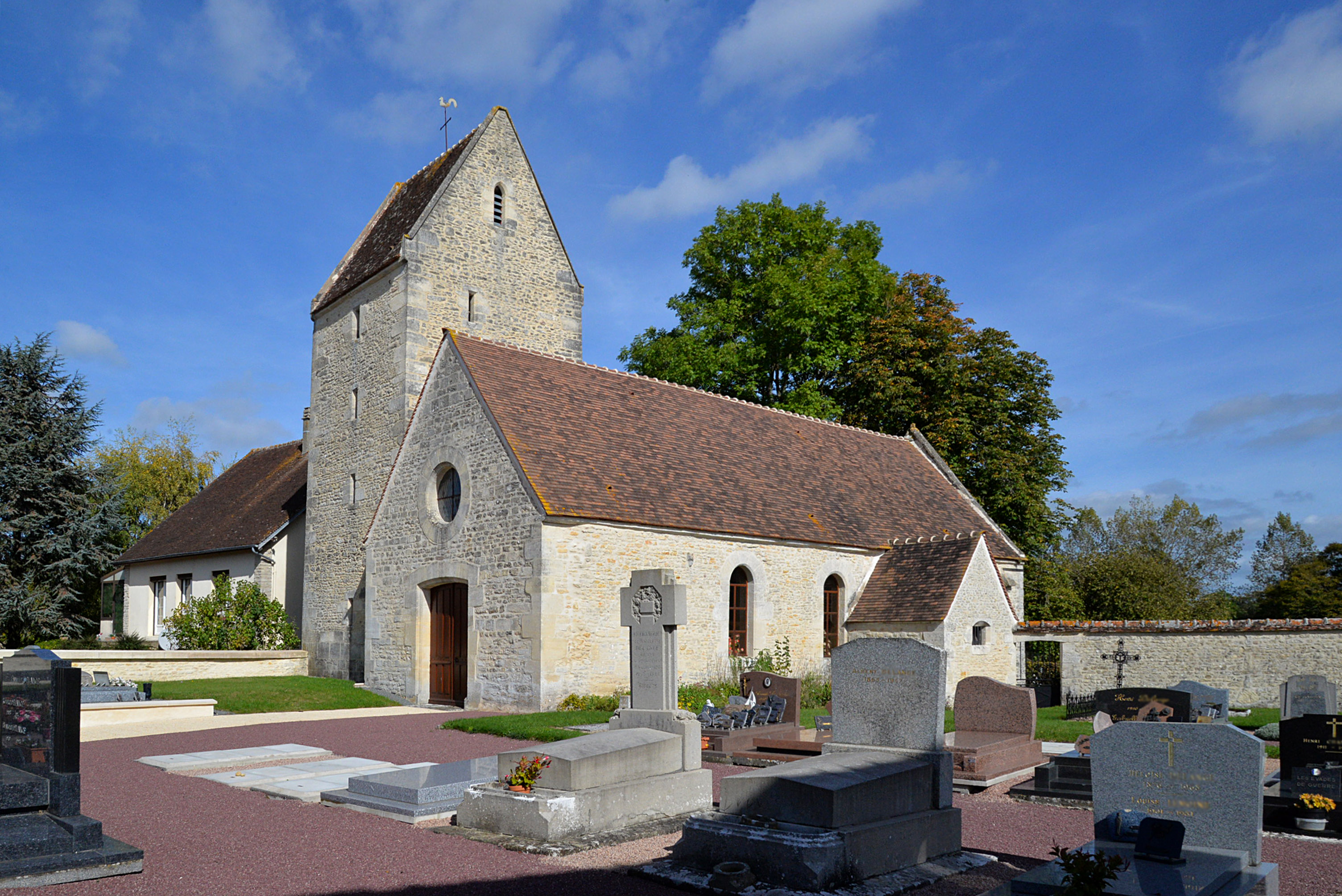
- The church in Juvigny-sur-Orne
- Location of Juvigny-sur-Orne
- Location within France Location within Normandy
- Coordinates: 48°43′55″N 0°01′22″E
- Country: France
- Region: Normandy
- Department: Orne
- Arrondissement: Argentan
- Canton: Argentan-1
- Intercommunality: Terres d'Argentan Interco

Government
  - Mayor (2020–2026): Jean-Jacques Lahaye
- Area^{1}: 3.30 km^{2} (1.27 sq mi)
- Elevation: 160 m (520 ft)
- Highest elevation: 173 m (568 ft)
- Lowest elevation: 152 m (499 ft)
- Population (2023): 106
  - Density: 32.1/km^{2} (83.2/sq mi)
- Time zone: UTC+01:00 (CET)
  - Summer (DST): UTC+02:00 (CEST)
- INSEE/Postal code: 61212 /61200
- ^{1} French Land Register data, which excludes lakes, ponds, glaciers > 1 km^{2} (0.386 sq mi or 247 acres) and river estuaries.

Juvigny-sur-Orne (French pronunciation: [ʒyviɲi syʁ ɔʁn], literally Juvigny on Orne) is a commune in the Orne department in north-western France.

== Geography ==
The commune is made up of the following collection of villages and hamlets, Le Port d'Aunou and Juvigny-sur-Orne.

Parts of the commune make up the area, the Plaine d'Argentan, which is known for its cereal growing fileds and horse stud farms.

Juvigny-sur-Orne along with another 65 communes is part of a 20,593 hectare, Natura 2000 conservation area, called the Haute vallée de l'Orne et affluents.

The river Orne flows through the commune.

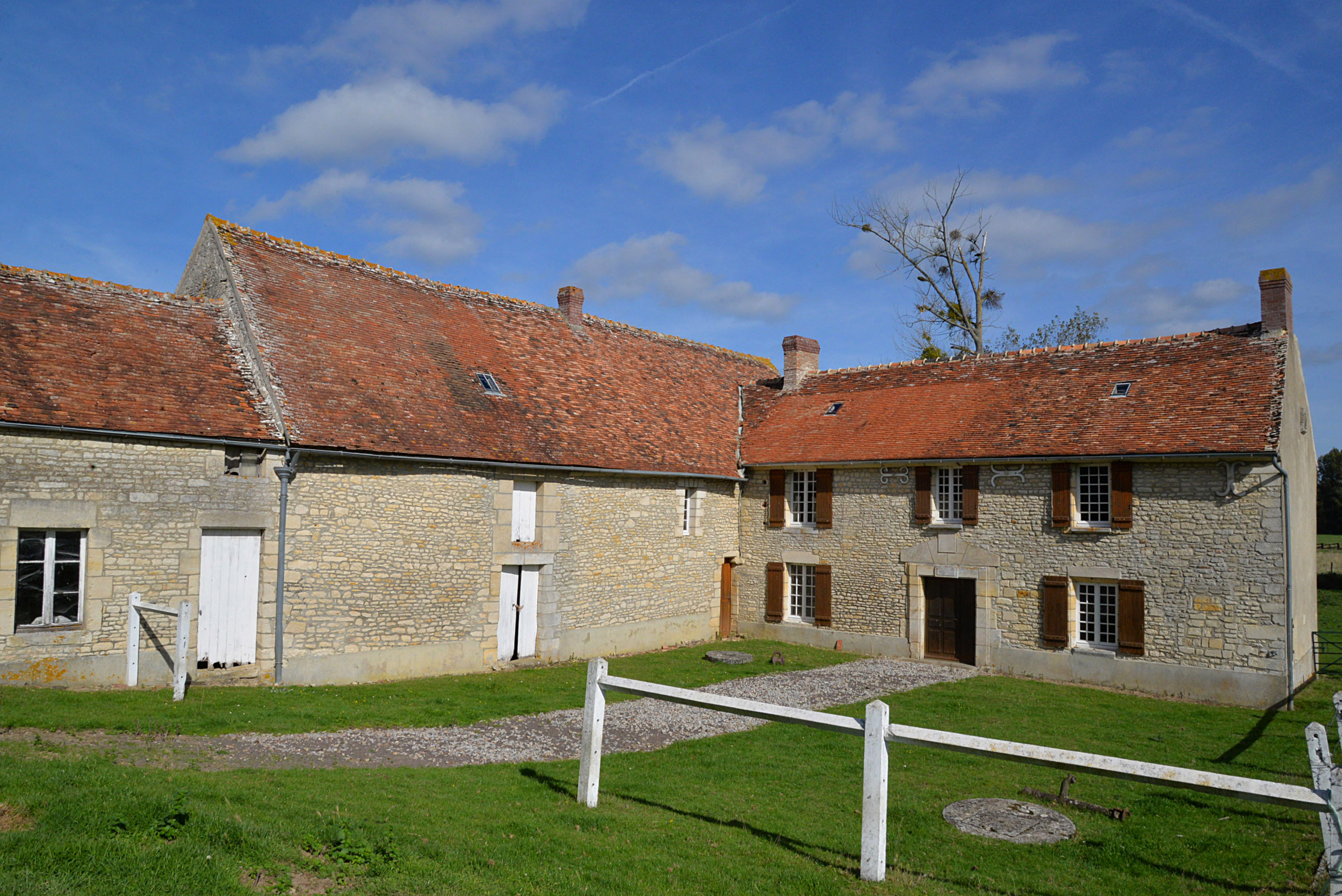
Saint-Thibault priory in Juvigny-sur-Orne

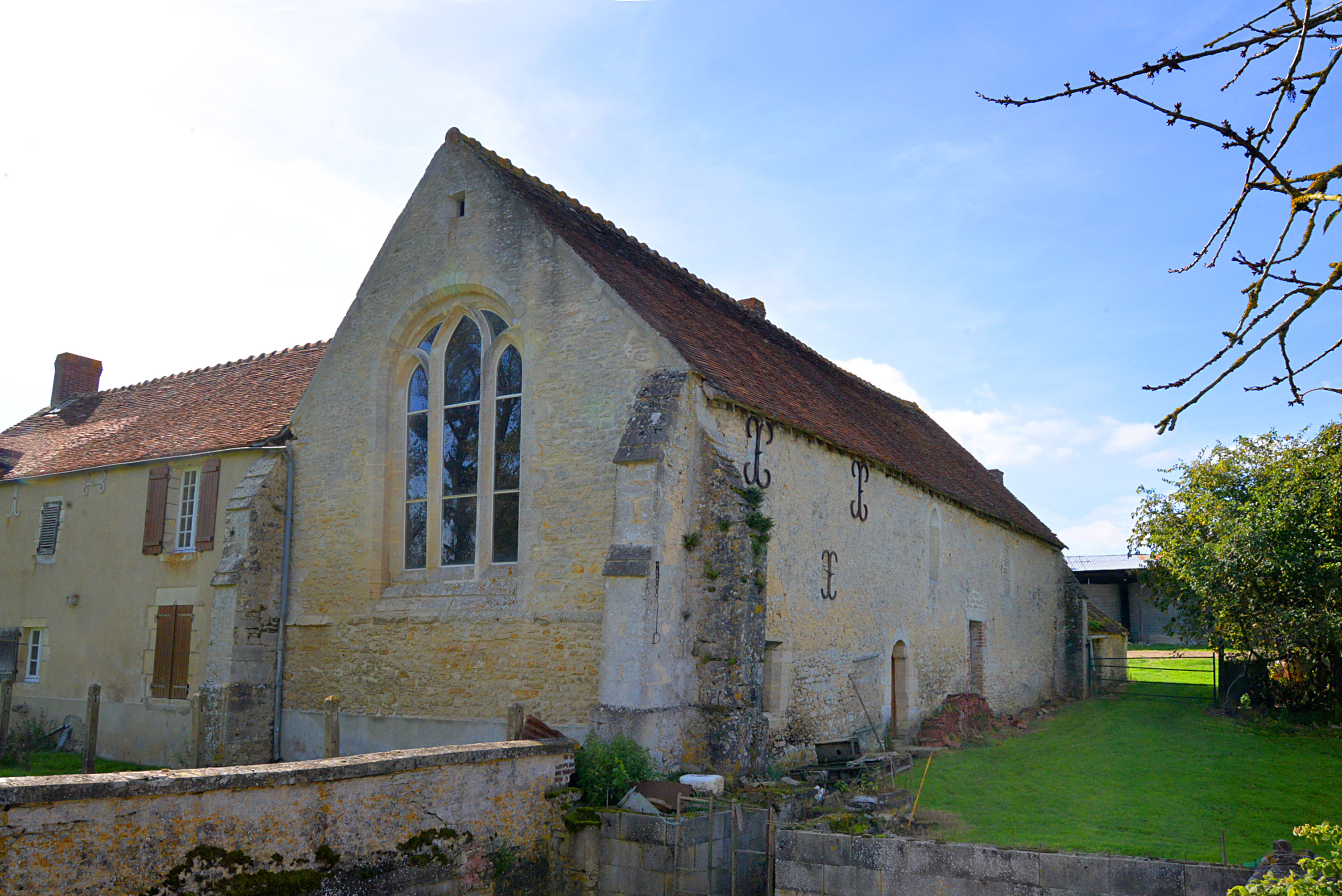
Priory Chapelle of Saint-Thibault in Juvigny-sur-Orne

== See also ==
- Communes of the Orne department
