= Haras du Petit Tellier =

Horse farm in France

Haras du Petit Tellier is one of the oldest thoroughbred horse breeding farms in France having been built in 1950. Located on 1.45 km² at Sévigny, Orne in the Lower Normandy region, the business was founded in 1850 and is today run by the founder's descendant, Patrick Chedeville.

== Studs ==
The following Studs have been/or are at this stable or involved with the family:

- Sea Bird
- Elvstroem
- Prince Rose
- The Grey Gatsby
- Le Marmot
