= Sarceaux =

- Commune
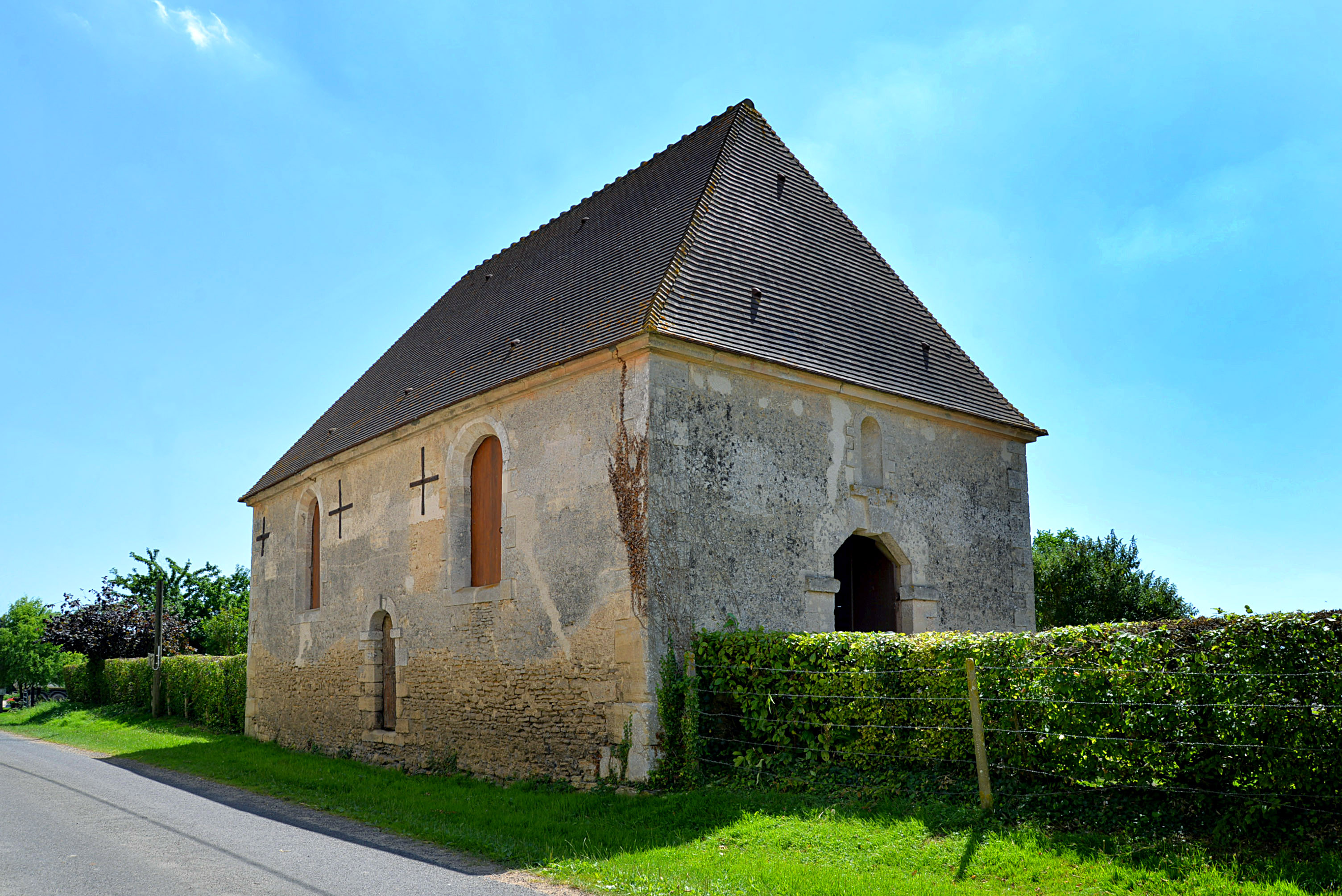
- The old chapel in Sarceaux
- Location of Sarceaux
- Location within France Location within Normandy
- Coordinates: 48°43′09″N 0°02′24″W
- Country: France
- Region: Normandy
- Department: Orne
- Arrondissement: Argentan
- Canton: Argentan-1
- Intercommunality: Terres d'Argentan Interco

Government
  - Mayor (2020–2026): Patrick Claeys
- Area^{1}: 10.77 km^{2} (4.16 sq mi)
- Elevation: 185 m (607 ft)
- Highest elevation: 181 m (594 ft)
- Lowest elevation: 149 m (489 ft)
- Population (2023): 1,063
  - Density: 98.70/km^{2} (255.6/sq mi)
- Time zone: UTC+01:00 (CET)
  - Summer (DST): UTC+02:00 (CEST)
- INSEE/Postal code: 61462 /61200
- ^{1} French Land Register data, which excludes lakes, ponds, glaciers > 1 km^{2} (0.386 sq mi or 247 acres) and river estuaries.

Sarceaux (French pronunciation: [saʁso]) is a commune in the Orne department in north-western France.

== Geography ==
Sarceaux along with another 65 communes is part of a 20,593 hectare, Natura 2000 conservation area, called the Haute vallée de l'Orne et affluents.

The commune is within the area known as the Plaine d'Argentan, which is known for its cereal growing fileds and horse stud farms.

The commune has two rivers running through it, the Orne and one of its tributaries the Baize.

== Town twinning ==
Sarceaux's twin towns are:

- West Hendred, Oxfordshire – England.
- East Hendred, Oxfordshire – England.

== See also ==
- Communes of the Orne department
