= Sai, Orne =

Sai
- Commune
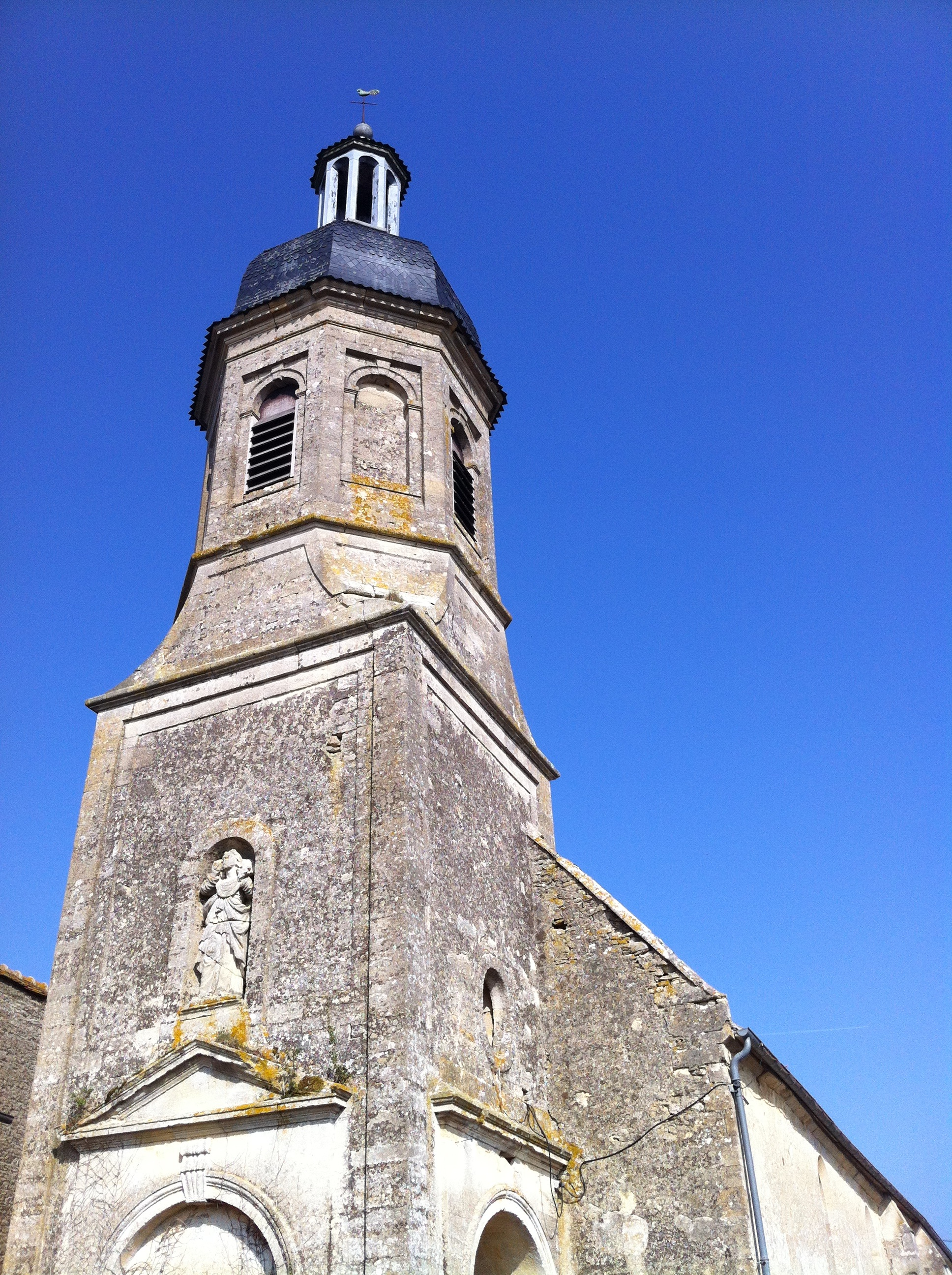
- The church in Sai
- Location of Sai
- Location within France Location within Normandy
- Coordinates: 48°44′41″N 0°01′36″E
- Country: France
- Region: Normandy
- Department: Orne
- Arrondissement: Argentan
- Canton: Argentan-1
- Intercommunality: Terres d'Argentan Interco

Government
  - Mayor (2020–2026): Jean-Pierre Leroux
- Area^{1}: 5.04 km^{2} (1.95 sq mi)
- Highest elevation: 186 m (610 ft)
- Lowest elevation: 152 m (499 ft)
- Population (2023): 230
  - Density: 46/km^{2} (120/sq mi)
- Demonym: Sayiens
- Time zone: UTC+01:00 (CET)
  - Summer (DST): UTC+02:00 (CEST)
- INSEE/Postal code: 61358 /61200
- ^{1} French Land Register data, which excludes lakes, ponds, glaciers > 1 km^{2} (0.386 sq mi or 247 acres) and river estuaries.

Sai is a commune in the Orne department in northwestern France. It has a population of 222. Its inhabitants are known as Sayiens (male) and Sayiennes (female).

== Geography ==
The commune of is made up of the following villages and hamlets (Bordeaux and Sai).

Parts of the commune make up the area, the Plaine d'Argentan, which is known for its cereal growing fileds and horse stud farms.

Sai along with another 65 communes is part of a 20,593 hectare, Natura 2000 conservation area, called the Haute vallée de l'Orne et affluents.

Sai has 2 bodies of water running through it, the Orne and the Ure.

== Toponymy ==
The name of the village has been found under the forms: Saium in 1086, See et Zee in 1207, Saieum in 1223, Sav in 1418.

== Notable people ==
- Thierry Ardisson (1949), a French TV host and Producer lives in the commune.

== See also ==
- Communes of the Orne department
