= Occagnes =

- Commune
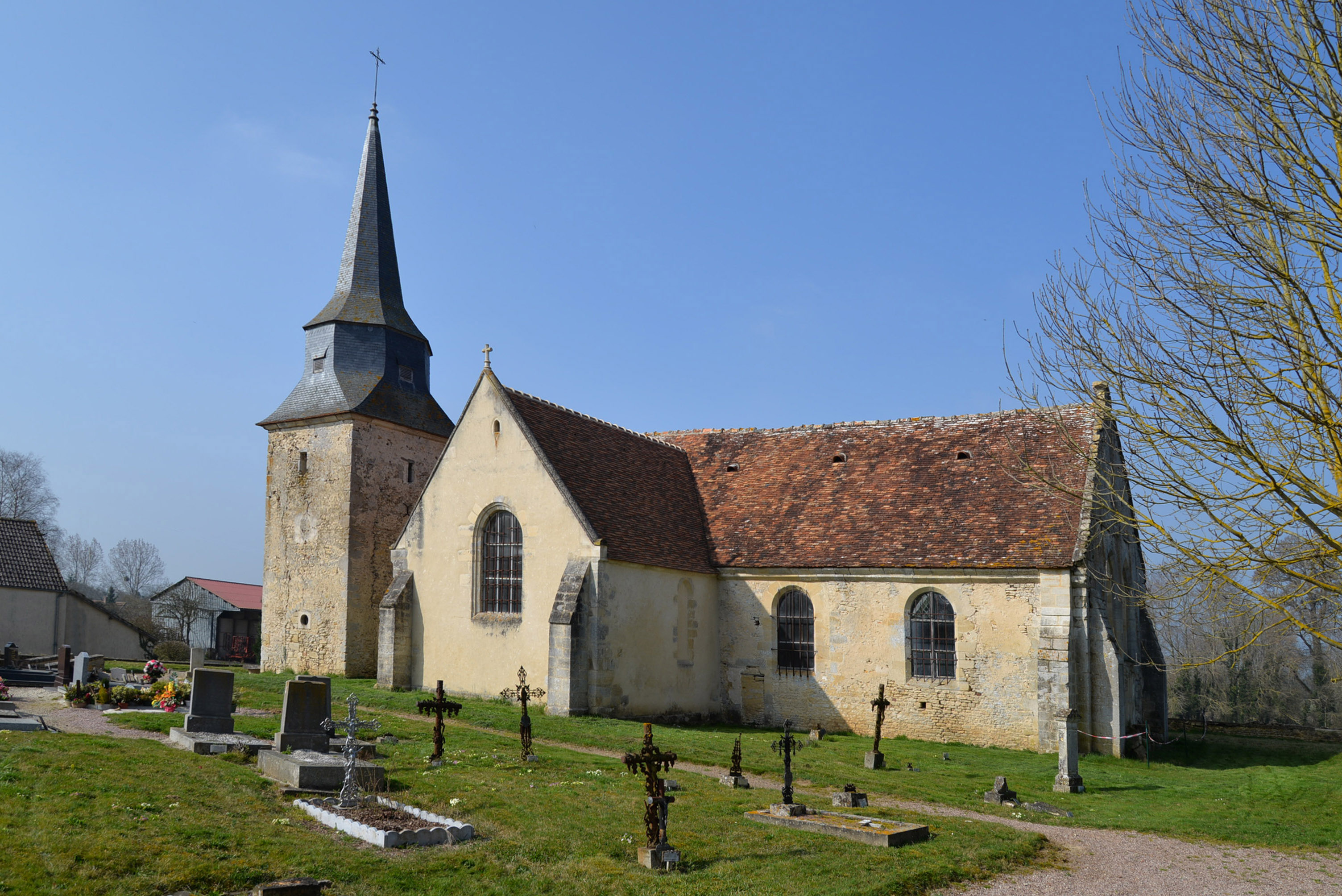
- The church of Saint-Gervais et Saint-Protais of Occagnes
- Location of Occagnes
- Location within France Location within Normandy
- Coordinates: 48°46′45″N 0°04′17″W
- Country: France
- Region: Normandy
- Department: Orne
- Arrondissement: Argentan
- Canton: Argentan-1
- Intercommunality: Terres d'Argentan Interco

Government
  - Mayor (2020–2026): Karine Bourdelas
- Area^{1}: 15.56 km^{2} (6.01 sq mi)
- Elevation: 177 m (581 ft)
- Highest elevation: 244 m (801 ft)
- Lowest elevation: 160 m (520 ft)
- Population (2023): 671
  - Density: 43.1/km^{2} (112/sq mi)
- Time zone: UTC+01:00 (CET)
  - Summer (DST): UTC+02:00 (CEST)
- INSEE/Postal code: 61314 /61200
- ^{1} French Land Register data, which excludes lakes, ponds, glaciers > 1 km^{2} (0.386 sq mi or 247 acres) and river estuaries.

Occagnes (French pronunciation: [ɔkaɲ]) is a commune in the Orne department in north-western France.

== Geography ==
The commune is made up of the following collection of villages and hamlets, Pommainville, La Petite Rue,Cuy and Occagnes.

Parts of the commune make up the area, the Plaine d'Argentan, which is known for its cereal growing fileds and horse stud farms.

Occagnes along with another 65 communes is part of a 20,593 hectare, Natura 2000 conservation area, called the Haute vallée de l'Orne et affluents.

The commune has the River Houay and one of its tributaries the Ruisseau des Fontaines Thiot running through it.

== Notable buildings and places ==
=== National heritage sites ===
The Commune has 2 buildings and areas listed as a Monument historique

- Château de Cuy a 17th Century Chateau in Occagnes registered as a Monument historique in 1936.
- Church of Cuy is an 11th Century Church that is an example of the first Romanesque art.
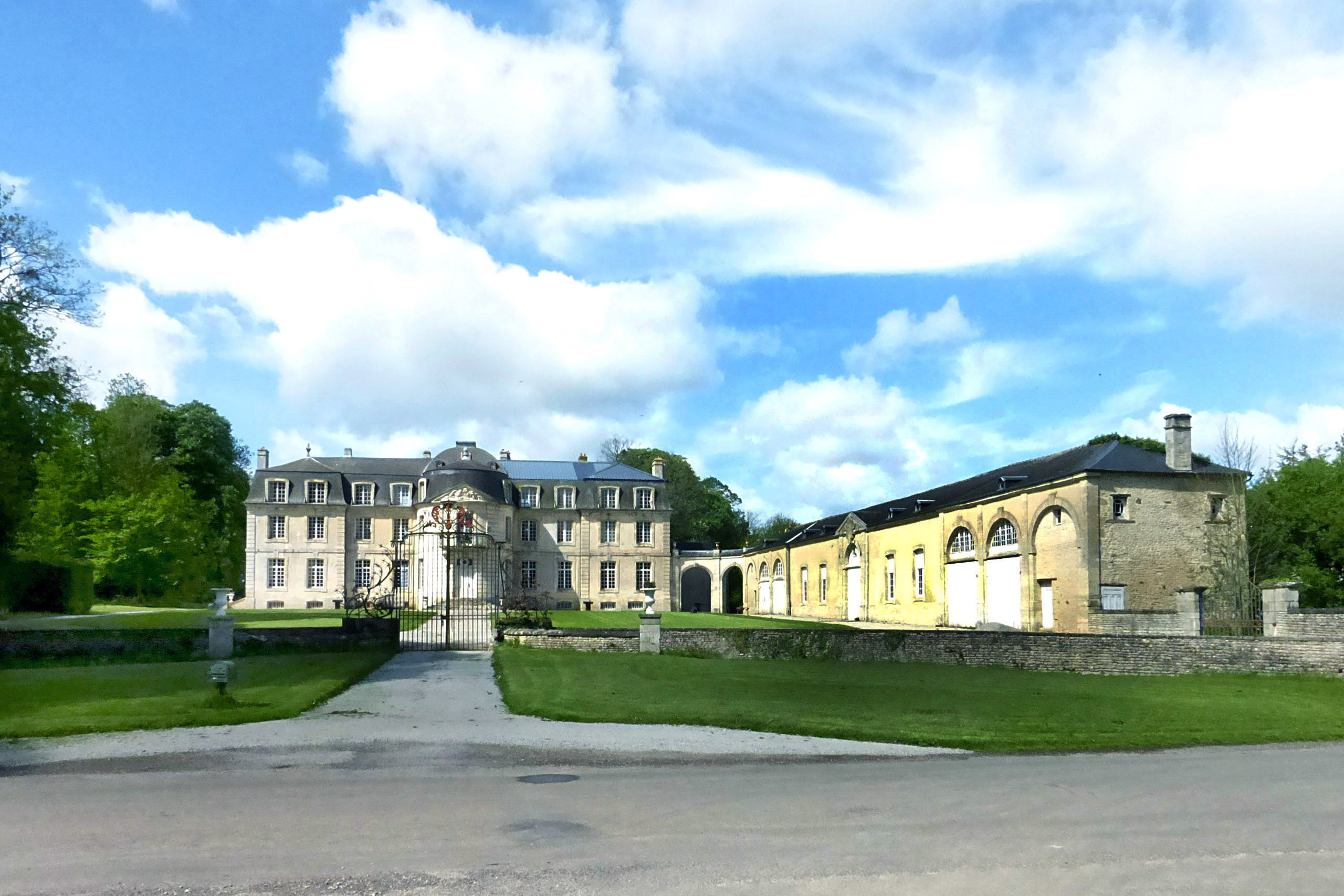
Château de Cuy (Occagnes)

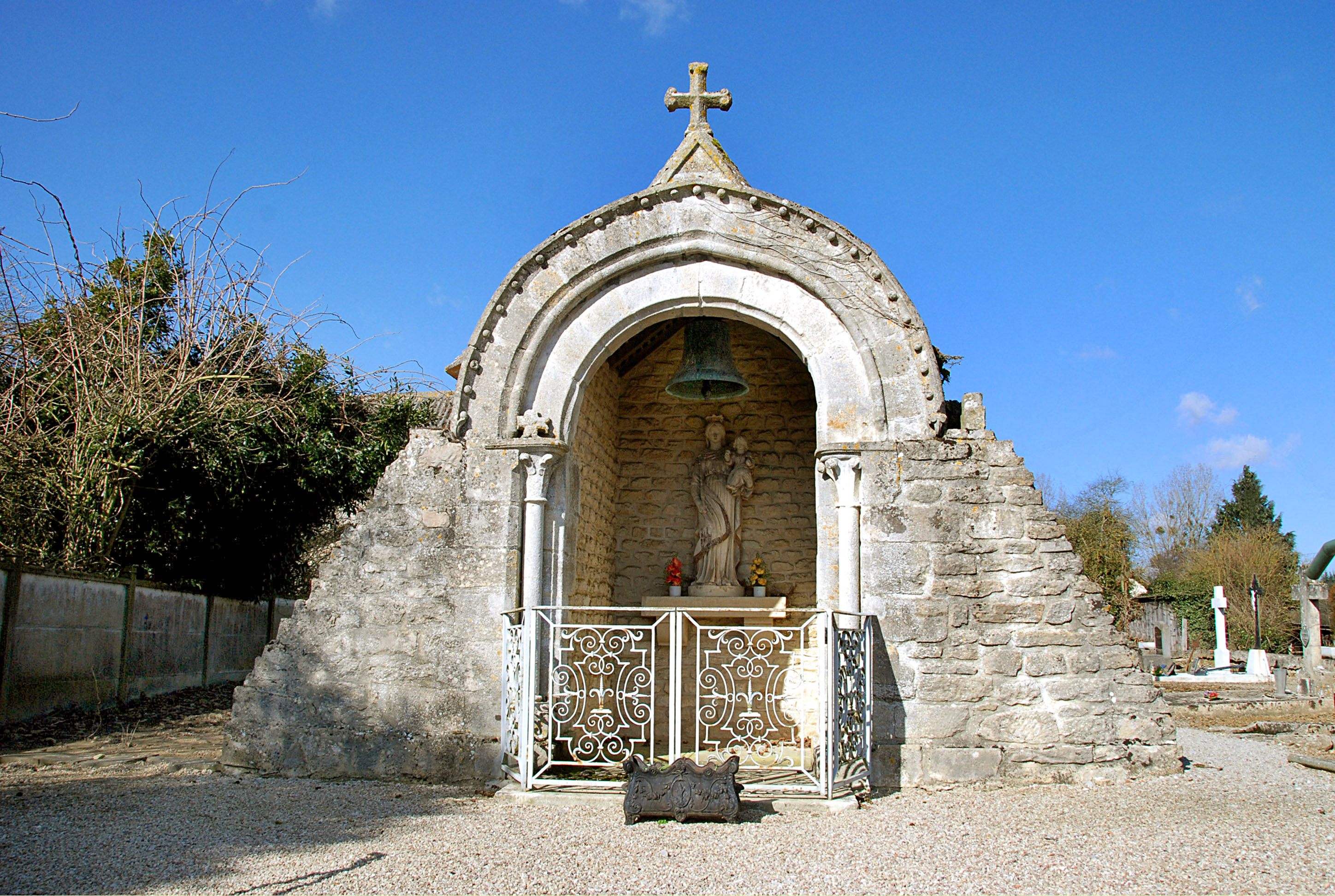
Vestiges de l’église Saint-Cyr et Sainte-Julitte d’Occagnes (Pommainville)

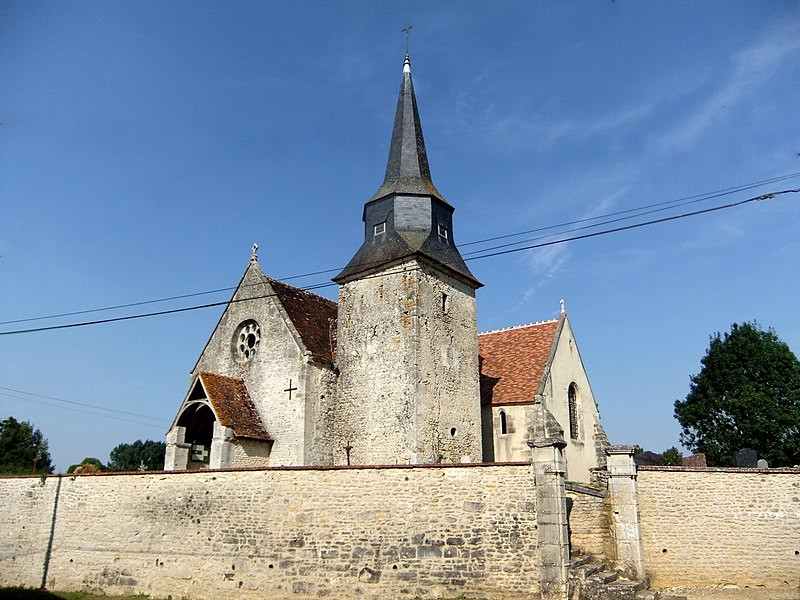
Church of Cuy - as photographed by Milka-berger

== See also ==
- Communes of the Orne department
