= Rônai =

- Commune
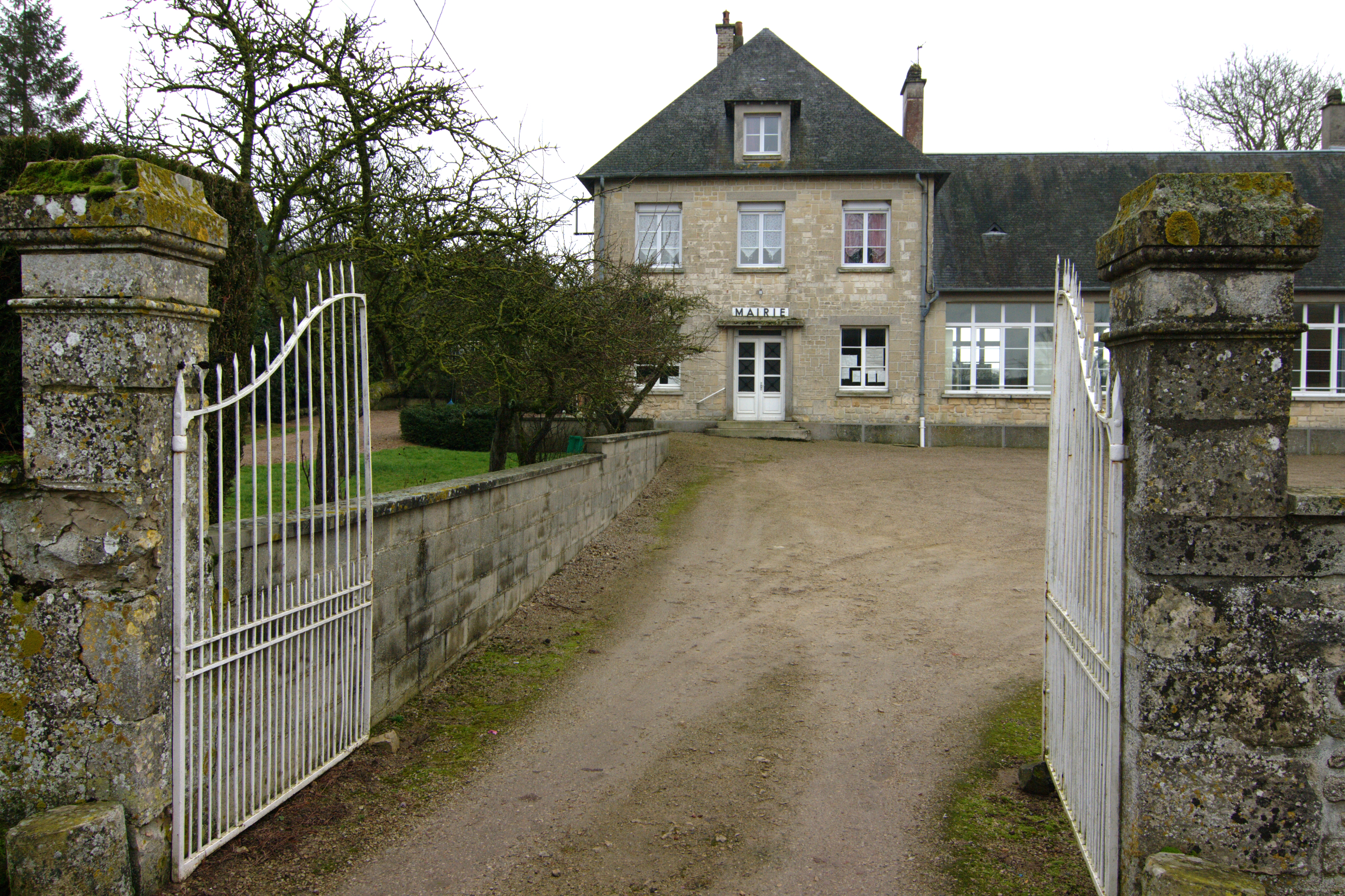
- The town hall in Rônai
- Location of Rônai
- Location within France Location within Normandy
- Coordinates: 48°48′51″N 0°08′06″W
- Country: France
- Region: Normandy
- Department: Orne
- Arrondissement: Argentan
- Canton: Argentan-1
- Intercommunality: Terres d'Argentan Interco

Government
  - Mayor (2020–2026): Hubert Séjourné
- Area^{1}: 5.40 km^{2} (2.08 sq mi)
- Elevation: 218 m (715 ft)
- Highest elevation: 260 m (850 ft)
- Lowest elevation: 194 m (636 ft)
- Population (2023): 182
  - Density: 33.7/km^{2} (87.3/sq mi)
- Time zone: UTC+01:00 (CET)
  - Summer (DST): UTC+02:00 (CEST)
- INSEE/Postal code: 61352 /61160
- ^{1} French Land Register data, which excludes lakes, ponds, glaciers > 1 km^{2} (0.386 sq mi or 247 acres) and river estuaries.

Rônai (French pronunciation: [ʁonɛ]) is a commune in the Orne department in north-western France.

== Geography ==
The commune of Rônai borders Suisse Normande to the west of its borders. The commune is spread over an area of 5.4 square kilometres (1,300 acres) with a maximum altitude of 260 metres (853 ft 0 in) and minimum of 194 metres (636 ft 6 in)

Parts of the commune make up the area, the Plaine d'Argentan, which is known for its cereal growing fileds and horse stud farms.

The commune is made up of the following collection of villages and hamlets, Rônai and Pierrefitte

=== Land distribution ===
The 2018 CORINE Land Cover assessment shows the vast majority of the land in the commune, 63% (342 hectares (850 acres)) is Arable land. The rest of the land is Meadows at 15%, and 110 hectares (270 acres) or 20% is classed as Heterogeneous agricultural land.

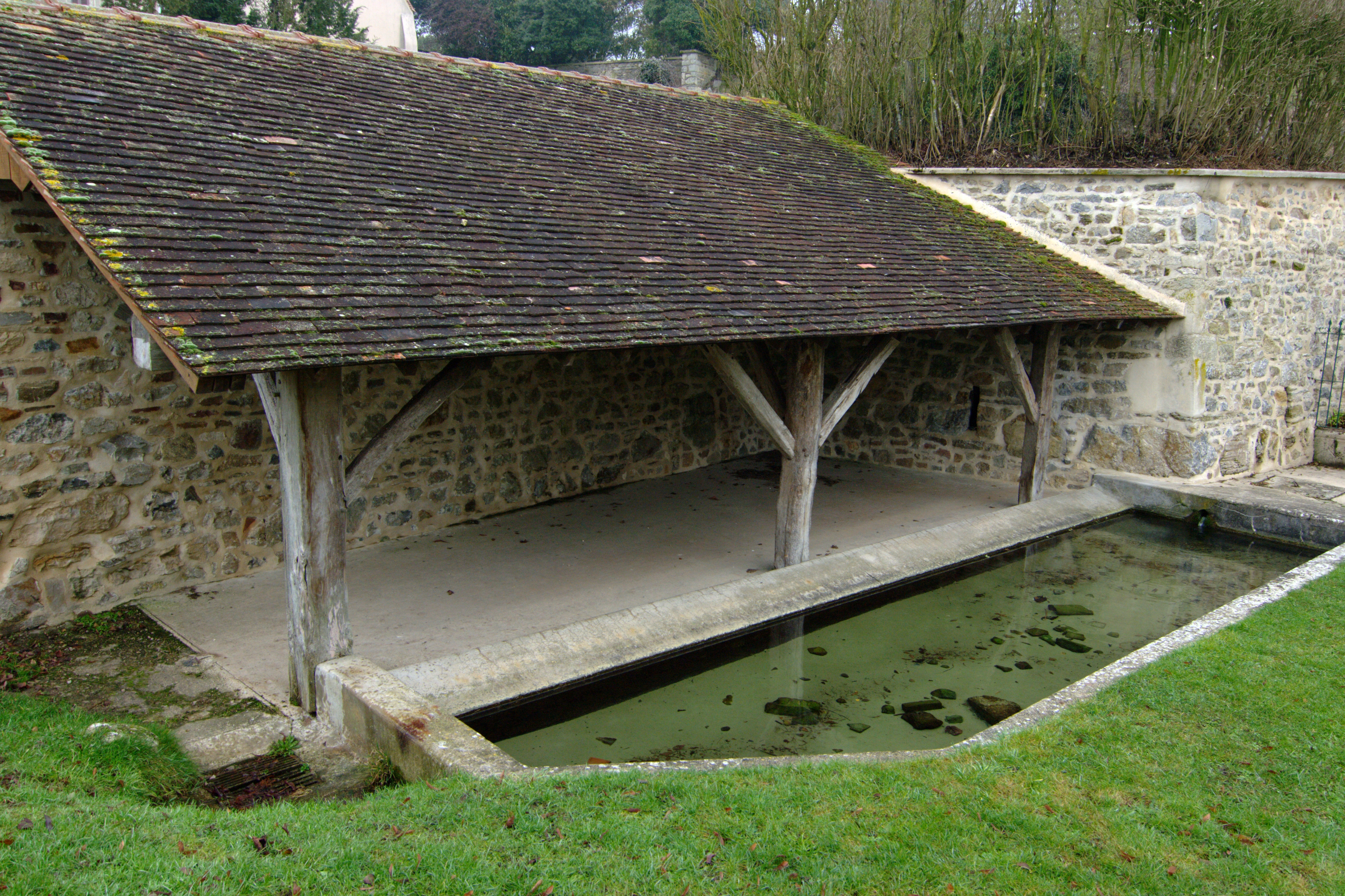
lavoir at Rônai

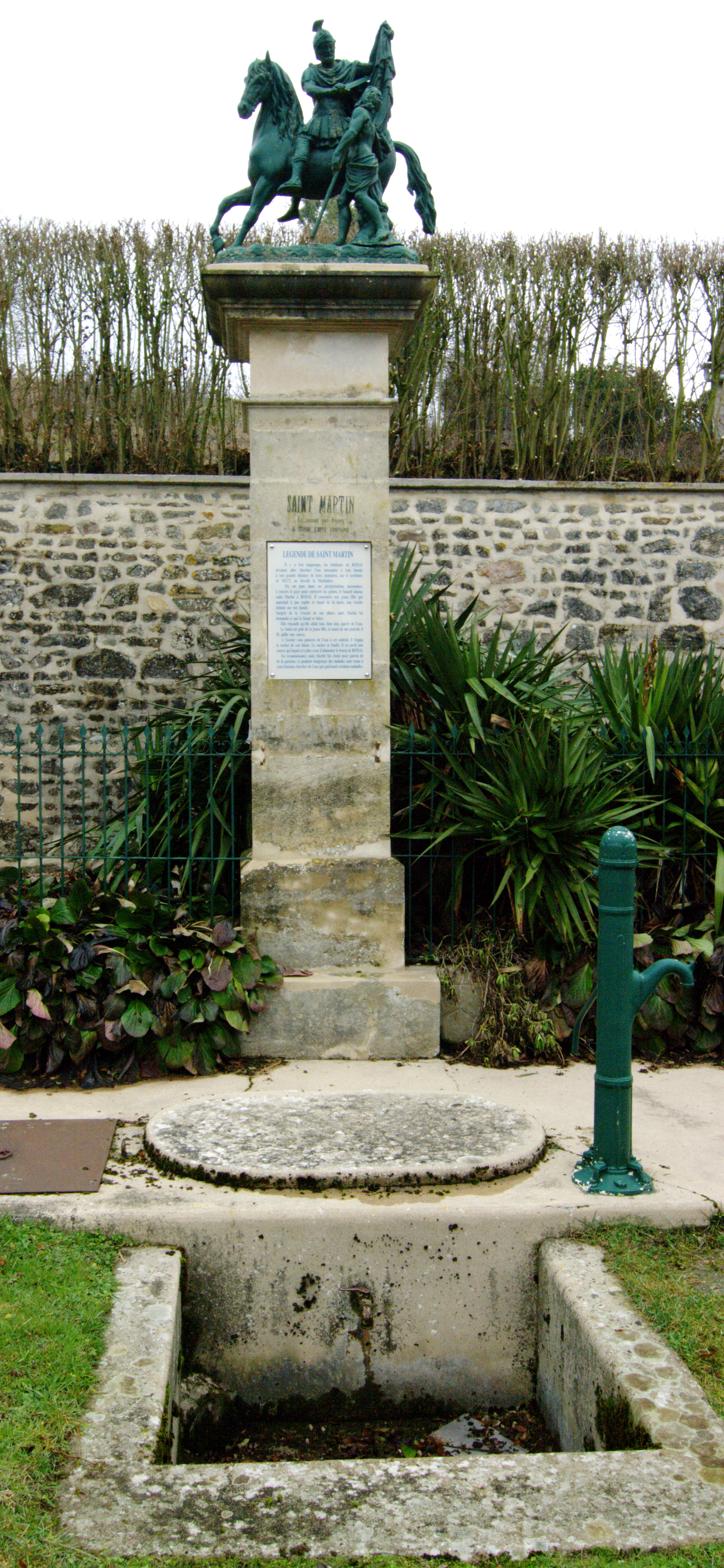
St-Martin fountain at Rônai

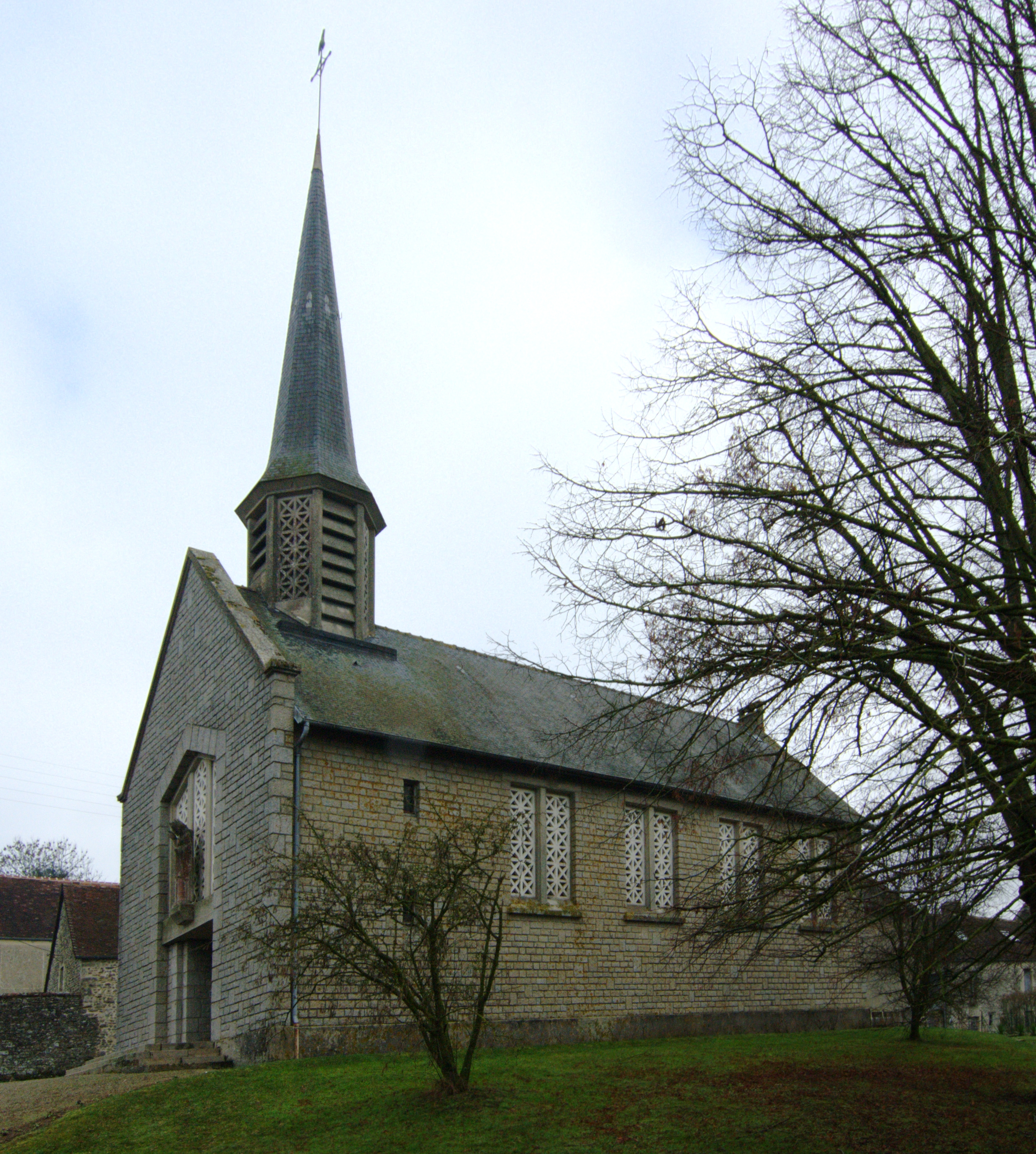
Rônai church

== See also ==
- Communes of the Orne department
