= Jacques-François Lefranc =

French cleric and anti-Masonic author

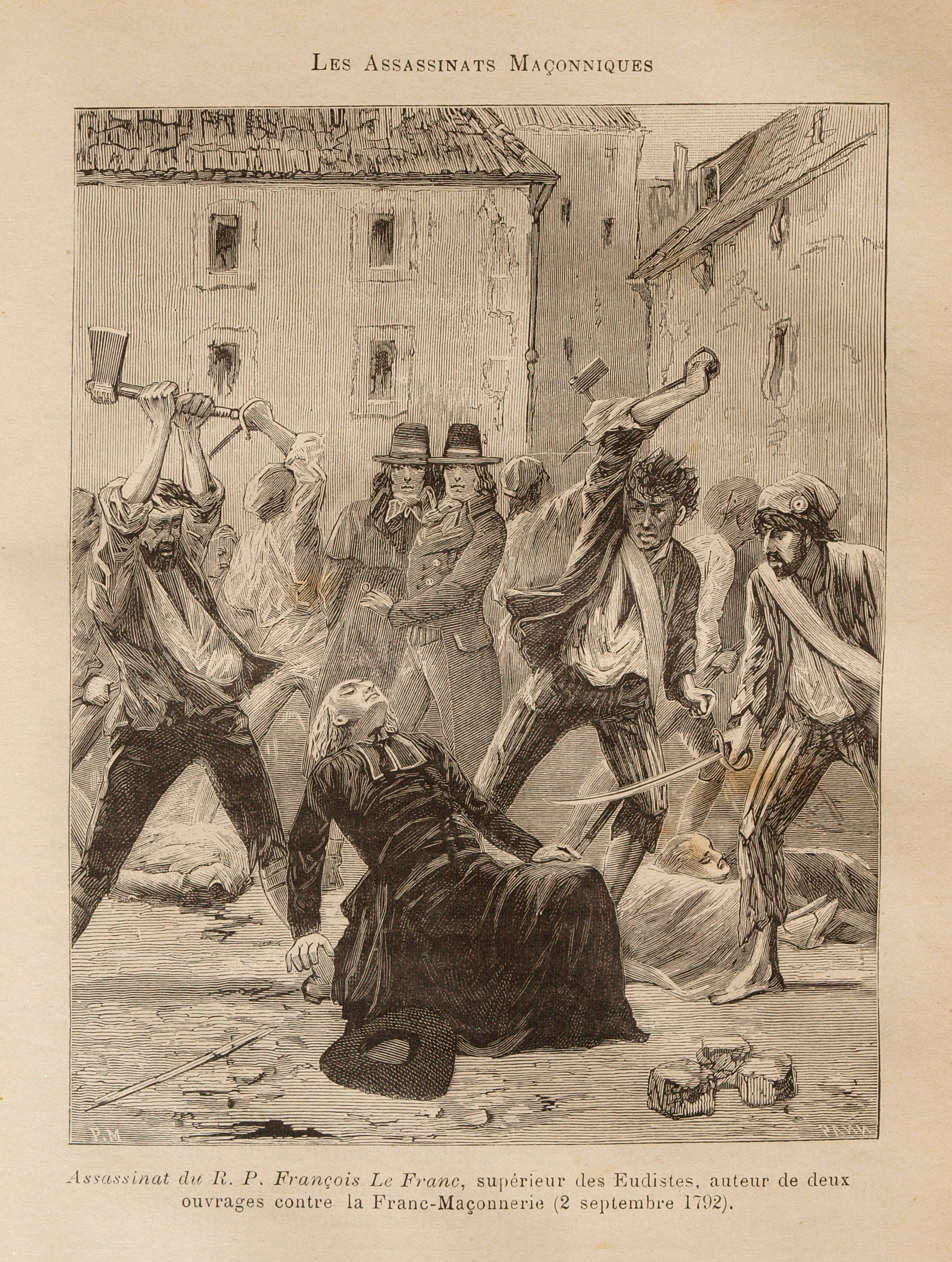
The assassination of Jacques-François Lefranc seen by Pierre Méjanel

Jacques-François Lefranc (30 March 1739 - 2 September 1792) was a French cleric and anti-Masonic author.

== Life ==
Lefranc was an Abbot at the seminary of the Congregation of Jesus and Mary in Caen; he was opposed to Jansenism. Lefranc was Vicar General of Coutances.

After refusing to swear allegiance to the Constitution, he was replaced by François Bécherel; all Eudidists were then expelled from the seminary. Lefranc was subsequently arrested and imprisoned in the Carmelites prison in Paris. On 2 September 1792, he was murdered along with 180 other clerics. He has since been beatified by the Church.

His book, Le Voile levé pour les curieux, ou le Secret de la Révolution révélé, à l’aide de la Franc-Maçonnerie, published in 1791, advanced, for the first time, the thesis that a Masonic conspiracy was behind the French Revolution. He was a literary associate of Augustin Barruel.

== Works ==
=== Original French ===
- Le voile levé pour les curieux ou les secrets de la Révolution révelés à l'aide de la franc-maçonnerie, (Paris: Lepetit, 1791).
- Conjuration contre la religion catholique et les souverains, dont le projet, conçu en France, doit s’exécuter dans l’univers entier, ouvrage utile à tous les Français (Paris: Lepetit, 1792)
- L'Origine et la déclaration mystérieuse des francs-maçons (1793)
- La symbolique maçonnique

=== English Translations ===
- The Veil Lifted for the Curious, or the Secrets of the French Revolution with the Aid of Freemasonry (London: Spradabach, 2022).
