= Plaine d'Argentan =

Natural region in Normandy, France

The Plain d'Argentan (or Argentan Plain) is a natural region located in the center-north of the Orne department in Normandy, France. It is a cereal-growing plain surrounding the north, west, and south of the town of Argentan. The plain is bordered to the north by the Falaise countryside, to the west by the Houlme region (Norman bocage), to the south by the Alençon countryside, to the northeast by the Pays d'Auge, and to the east by the Pays d'Ouche. It ensures the continuity of the Caen plain and the Falaise countryside within the Normandy plain.

Historically, the Plain d'Argentan has been an important agricultural area in Normandy. Its fertile soil has supported farming activities for centuries, and the region has played a significant role in the local economy. In addition to farming the area is used for tourism, offering hiking, cycling and nature walks.

== Geography ==
The Plain d'Argentan is characterized by its flat terrain and fertile soil, making it ideal for cereal cultivation. The region is predominantly agricultural, with vast fields of wheat, barley, and other crops. The area is also heavily invested in Horse stud farming.

The area has seven rivers flowing through the area, the Dives, the Orne, the Cance, the Ure, the Baize, the Udon and the Houay.

The landscape is spread over the following communes:

1. Argentan
2. Avoine
3. Boischampré
4. Boucé
5. Commeaux
6. Écouché-les-Vallées
7. Fleuré
8. Gouffern en Auge
9. Habloville
10. Joué-du-Plain
11. Juvigny-sur-Orne
12. Montabard
13. Monts-sur-Orne
14. Moulins-sur-Orne
15. Occagnes
16. Ri
17. Rônai
18. Sai
19. Sarceaux
20. Sévigny
21. Sevrai
22. Tanques
23. Vieux-Pont
