= Canton of Argentan-1 =

Coordinates: 48.74°N 0.03°W

The canton of Argentan-1 is an administrative division of the Orne department, northwestern France. It was created at the French canton reorganisation which came into effect in March 2015. Its seat is in Argentan.

It consists of the following communes:

1. Argentan (partly)
2. Aunou-le-Faucon
3. Boischampré
4. Brieux
5. Commeaux
6. Juvigny-sur-Orne
7. Montabard
8. Moulins-sur-Orne
9. Nécy
10. Occagnes
11. Ri
12. Rônai
13. Sai
14. Sarceaux
15. Sévigny
