= Sévigny, Orne =

Sévigny
- Commune
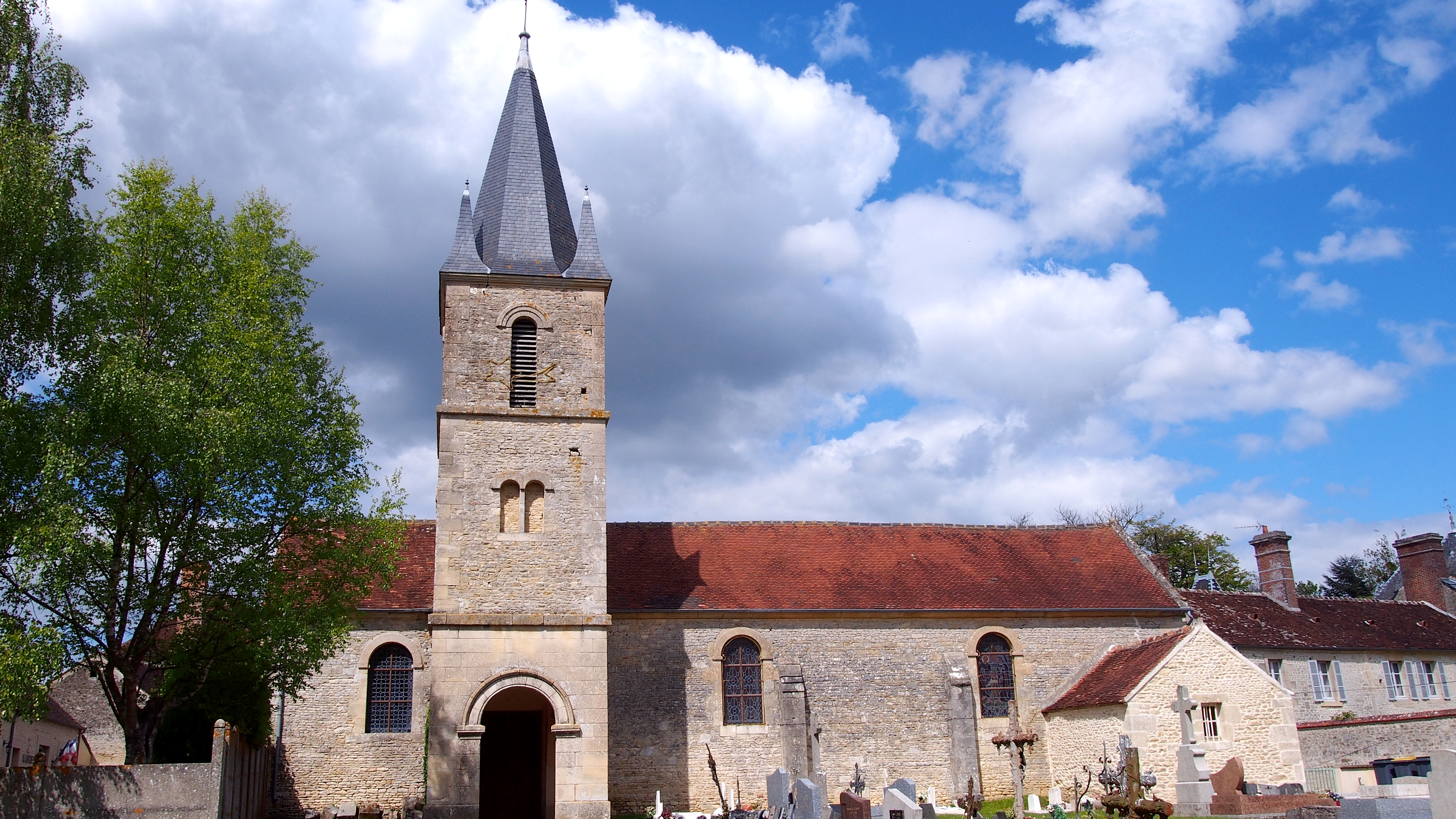
- The church in Sévigny
- Location of Sévigny
- Location within France Location within Normandy
- Coordinates: 48°46′54″N 0°00′56″W
- Country: France
- Region: Normandy
- Department: Orne
- Arrondissement: Argentan
- Canton: Argentan-1
- Intercommunality: Terres d'Argentan Interco

Government
  - Mayor (2020–2026): Brigitte Gasseau
- Area^{1}: 7.67 km^{2} (2.96 sq mi)
- Elevation: 216 m (709 ft)
- Highest elevation: 232 m (761 ft)
- Lowest elevation: 164 m (538 ft)
- Population (2023): 308
  - Density: 40.2/km^{2} (104/sq mi)
- Time zone: UTC+01:00 (CET)
  - Summer (DST): UTC+02:00 (CEST)
- INSEE/Postal code: 61472 /61200
- ^{1} French Land Register data, which excludes lakes, ponds, glaciers > 1 km^{2} (0.386 sq mi or 247 acres) and river estuaries.

Sévigny (French pronunciation: [seviɲi]) is a commune in the Orne department in north-western France.

== Geography ==
The commune is made up of the following collection of villages and hamlets, Les Buttes, Le Tellier and Sévigny.

Parts of the commune make up the area, the Plaine d'Argentan, which is known for its cereal growing fields and horse stud farms.

Sévigny along with another 65 communes is part of a 20,593 hectare, Natura 2000 conservation area, called the Haute vallée de l'Orne et affluents.

The Ruisseau des Fontaines Thiot is the only watercourse in the Commune.

== Notable buildings and places ==
- Haras du Petit Tellier, one of the oldest thoroughbred horse breeding farms in France is based in the Commune.

=== National heritage sites ===
- The New House Tilery, built in 1812 and expanded in 1854, this building was operational up until 1900. It was registered as a Monument historique in 1995.

== See also ==
- Communes of the Orne department
