= West Hendred =

Village in Oxfordshire, England

Coordinates: 51.594°N 1.353°W

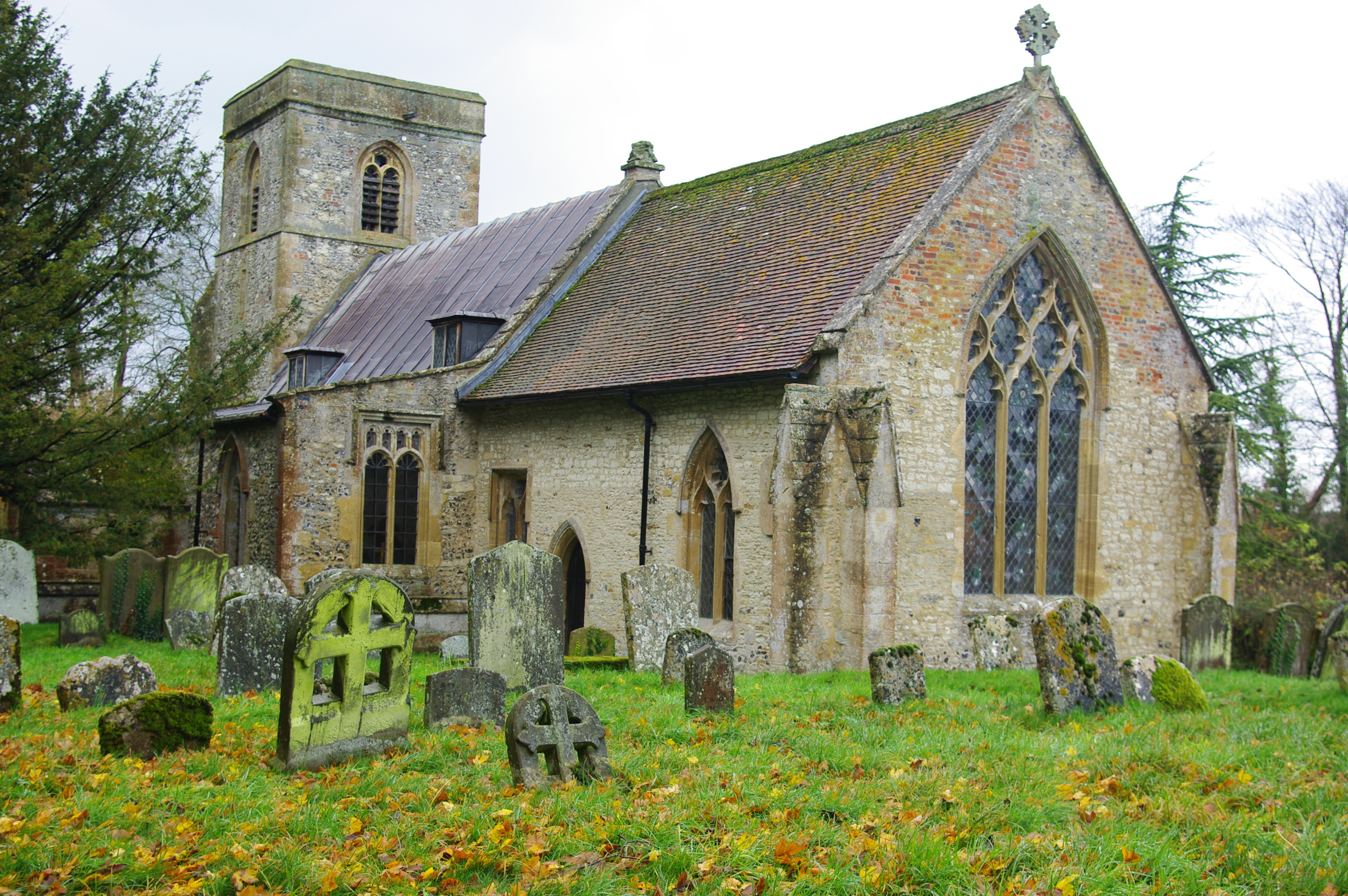
- Holy Trinity parish church

- Location within Oxfordshire
- Population: 385 (2001 census)
- OS grid reference: SU4488
- Civil parish: West Hendred
- District: Vale of the White Horse
- Shire county: Oxfordshire
- Region: South East
- Country: England
- Sovereign state: United Kingdom
- Post town: Wantage
- Postcode district: OX12
- Dialling code: 01235
- Police: Thames Valley
- Fire: Oxfordshire
- Ambulance: South Central
- UK Parliament: Didcot and Wantage
- Website: West Hendred Parish Council

West Hendred is a village and civil parish about 3 miles (5 km) east of Wantage. It was part of Berkshire until the 1974 boundary changes transferred it to Oxfordshire. West Hendred is downland village, its parish stretching from the Ridgeway in the south through the spring line and meadows to the former marshland of the Oxfordshire plain in the north. The parish is about 2,000 acres (810 ha) in area and 6 miles (10 km) long, but only being about 1/2 mile (800 m) wide at the widest point. This is an example of a downland linear parish encompassing a wide variety of land types – chalk downland, greensand on the spring line and clay to the north. The Great Western Main Line crosses the northern part of the parish. The Icknield Way and The Ridgeway cross the parish in the south.

The parish includes the hamlet of East Ginge, which is immediately below the Downs and includes Ginge Manor, home of Annabel Astor, Viscountess Astor, mother of Samantha Cameron. Neighbouring hamlet West Ginge, however, is in the parish of Lockinge. Both of the hamlets have populations less than 30, although records from the 1881 and 1901 censuses show that they were more extensive with several occupied farms up to the Downs. The parish has good examples of post-medieval drovers' roads, a Roman road, a buried Roman villa and well-preserved medieval watercress beds.

== History ==
The earliest reference to West Hendred is the granting of several hides of land to thegn Brihtric by Eadwig in 955 and by Edgar the Peaceful in 964 to Abingdon Abbey In 1538 Corpus Christi College, Oxford became the Lord of the manor. The college still owns considerable land in the village and surrounding area. The Church of England parish church of the Holy Trinity is a 13th-century building on the site of a former wooden Saxon church, with small flying buttresses and a series of carved sundials on the wall outside. The most notable historical element of the church is the floor tiling. These are good examples, if worn, of medieval tiles. Holy Trinity is a Grade I listed building as it is predominantly representative of one phase of building. The last head teacher of the parish school, from 1945 to 1967, was E.A.G. Prosser. In 1967 the school was closed and combined with East Hendred in new premises. West Hendred has a public house, The Extraordinary Hare, on the main A417 road to Wantage. It is now a gastropub.

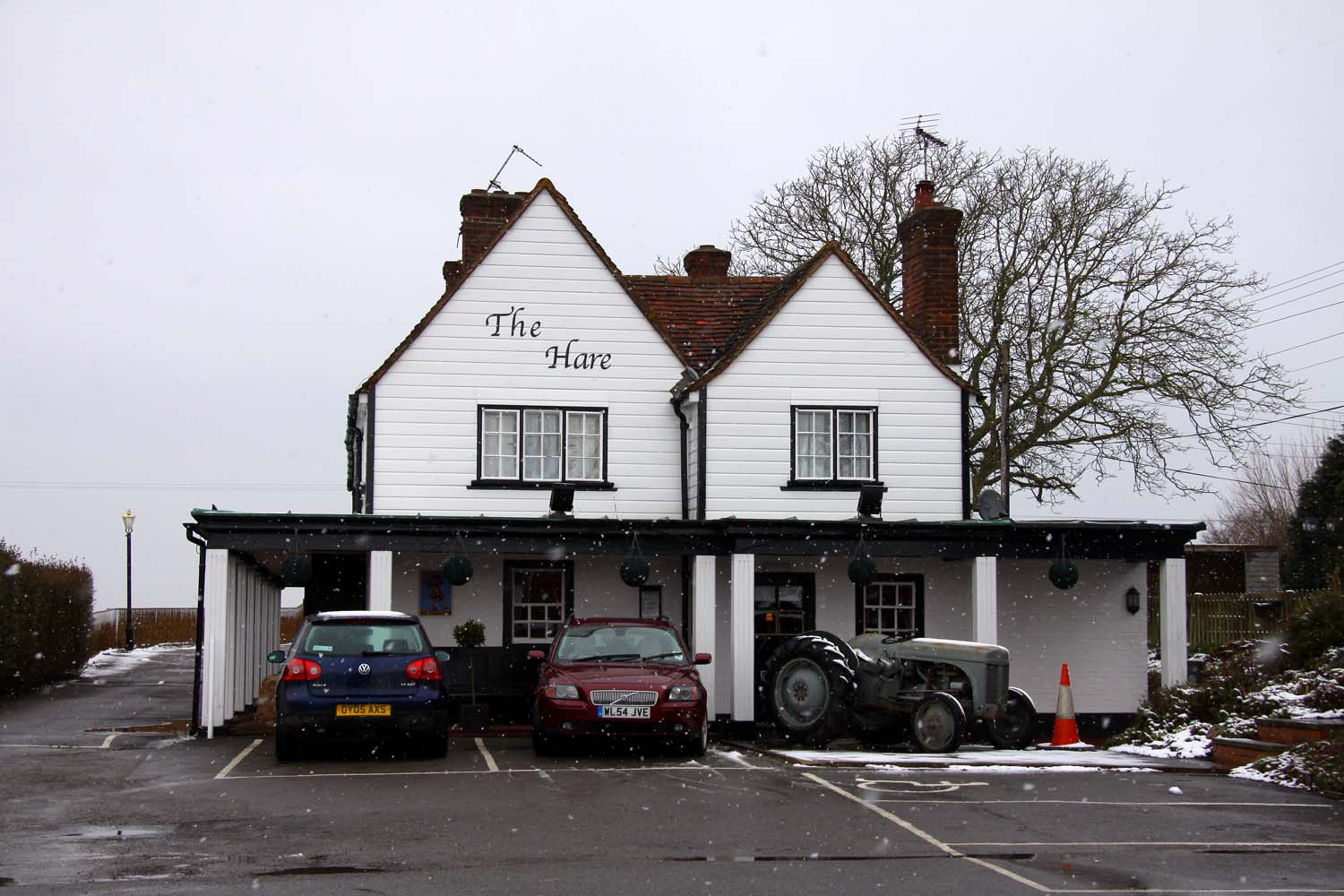
The Hare at West Hendred

== Town twinning ==
West Hendred is twinned with:

- Sarceaux, Orne – France.
