= Brieux =

- Commune
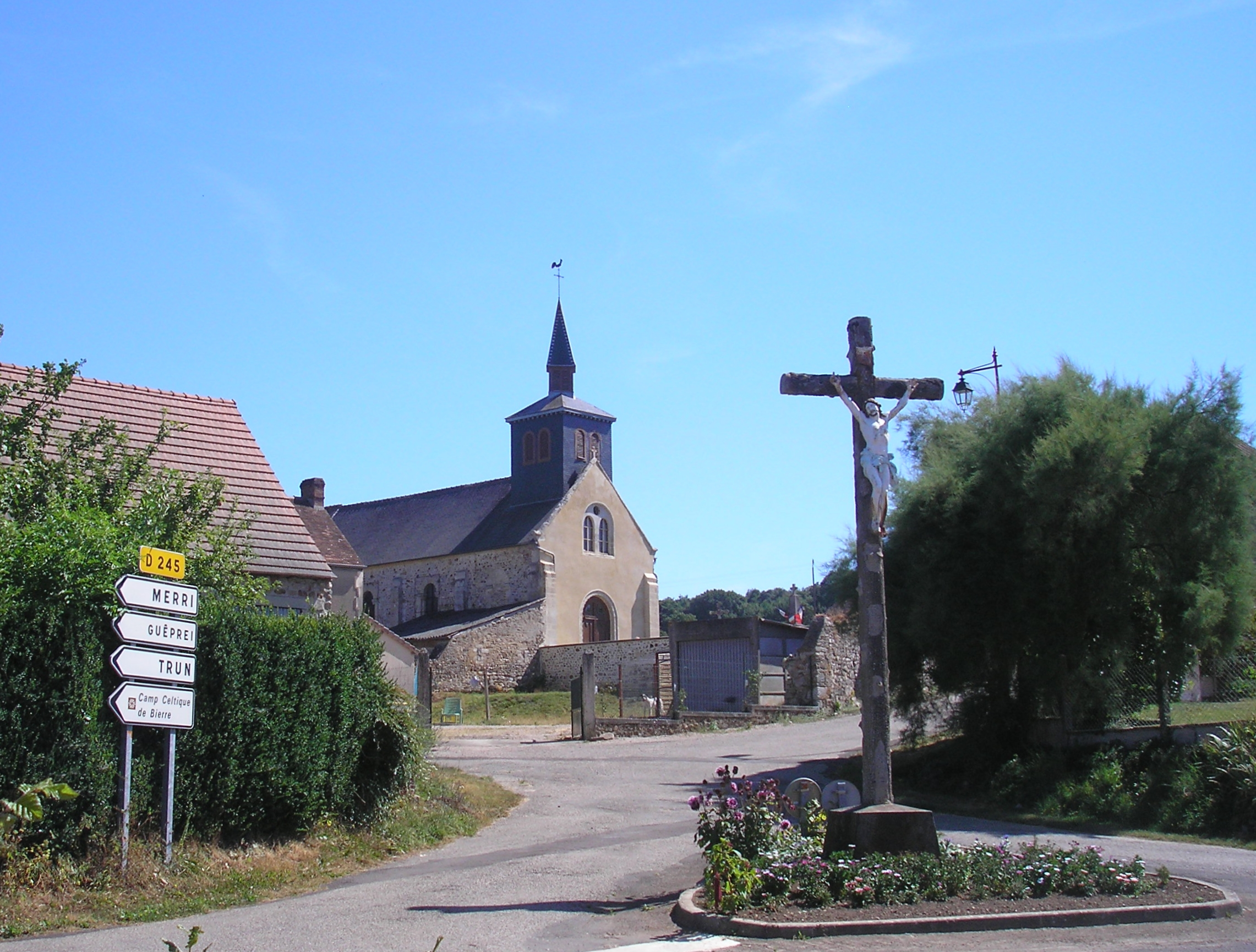
- The church in Brieux
- Location of Brieux
- Location within France Location within Normandy
- Coordinates: 48°50′24″N 0°04′54″W
- Country: France
- Region: Normandy
- Department: Orne
- Arrondissement: Argentan
- Canton: Argentan-1
- Intercommunality: Terres d'Argentan Interco

Government
  - Mayor (2020–2026): Catherine Gaignon
- Area^{1}: 5.17 km^{2} (2.00 sq mi)
- Elevation: 133 m (436 ft)
- Highest elevation: 212 m (696 ft)
- Lowest elevation: 110 m (360 ft)
- Population (2023): 88
  - Density: 17/km^{2} (44/sq mi)
- Time zone: UTC+01:00 (CET)
  - Summer (DST): UTC+02:00 (CEST)
- INSEE/Postal code: 61062 /61160
- ^{1} French Land Register data, which excludes lakes, ponds, glaciers > 1 km^{2} (0.386 sq mi or 247 acres) and river estuaries.

Brieux (French pronunciation: [bʁijø]) is a commune in the Orne department in northwestern France. The town gave its name to the ancestors of Robert the Bruce, Bruce being the Anglicisation of "Brieux".

== Geography ==
The commune has the Filaine river running through it. The Feuillet woods are in this commune.

== Population ==
Historical population
Year	Pop.	±% p.a.
1968	136	—
1975	111	−2.86%
1982	76	−5.27%
1990	74	−0.33%
1999	93	+2.57%
2007	94	+0.13%
2012	85	−1.99%
2017	90	+1.15%
2023	88	−0.37%
Source: INSEE

== See also ==
- Communes of the Orne department
