= Montabard =

- Commune
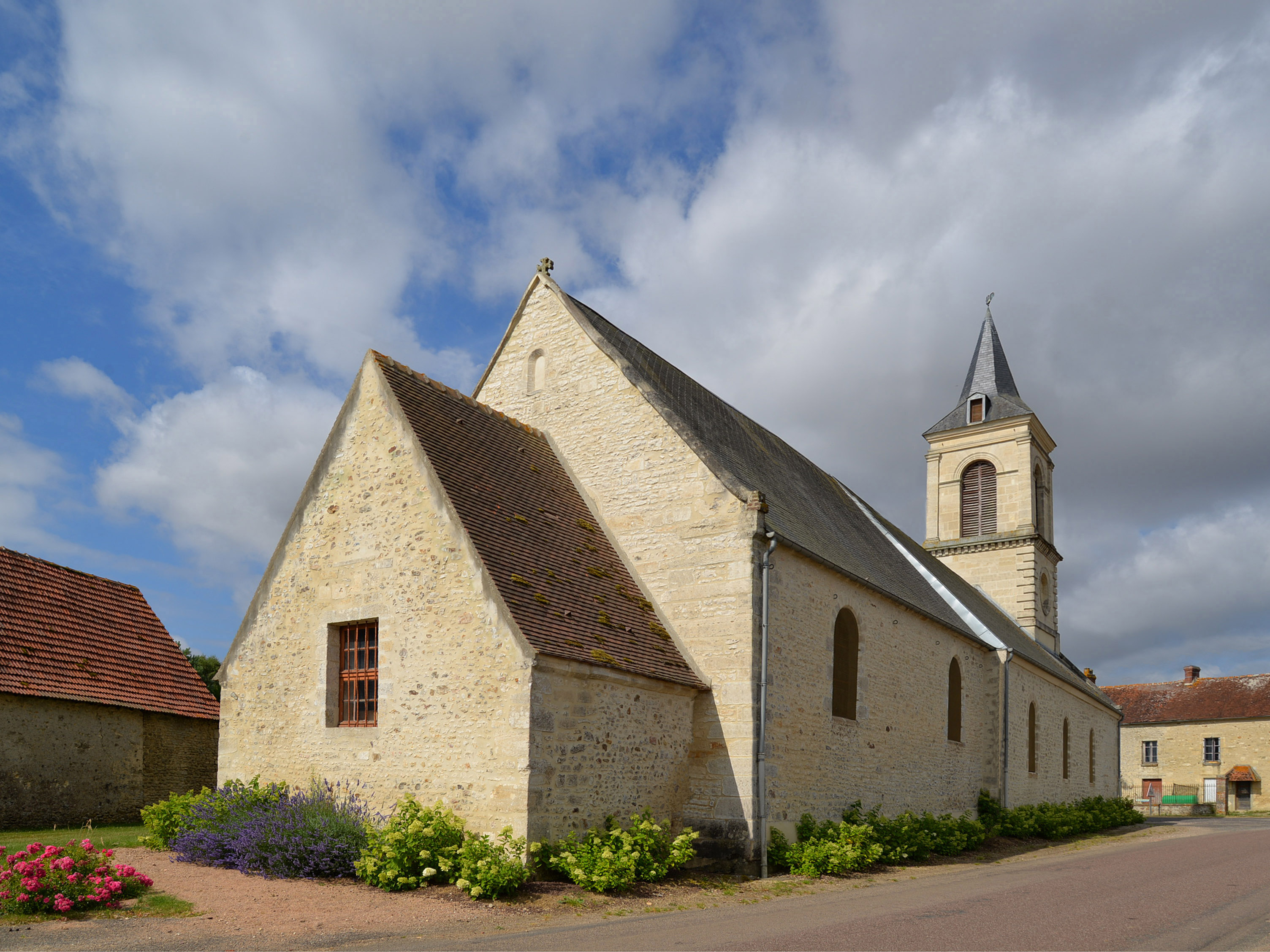
- Church of Saint Martin in Montabard
- Location of Montabard
- Location within France Location within Normandy
- Coordinates: 48°48′50″N 0°04′33″W
- Country: France
- Region: Normandy
- Department: Orne
- Arrondissement: Argentan
- Canton: Argentan-1
- Intercommunality: Terres d'Argentan Interco

Government
  - Mayor (2020–2026): Amélie Delaunay
- Area^{1}: 10.97 km^{2} (4.24 sq mi)
- Elevation: 252 m (827 ft)
- Highest elevation: 253 m (830 ft)
- Lowest elevation: 170 m (560 ft)
- Population (2023): 287
  - Density: 26.2/km^{2} (67.8/sq mi)
- Time zone: UTC+01:00 (CET)
  - Summer (DST): UTC+02:00 (CEST)
- INSEE/Postal code: 61283 /61160
- ^{1} French Land Register data, which excludes lakes, ponds, glaciers > 1 km^{2} (0.386 sq mi or 247 acres) and river estuaries.

Montabard (French pronunciation: [mɔ̃tabaʁ]) is a commune in the Orne department in north-western France.

== Geography ==
The commune is made up of the following collection of villages and hamlets, Montabard and Villers

Parts of the commune make up the area, the Plaine d'Argentan, which is known for its cereal growing fileds and horse stud farms.

Montabard along with another 65 communes is part of a 20,593 hectare, Natura 2000 conservation area, called the Haute vallée de l'Orne et affluents.

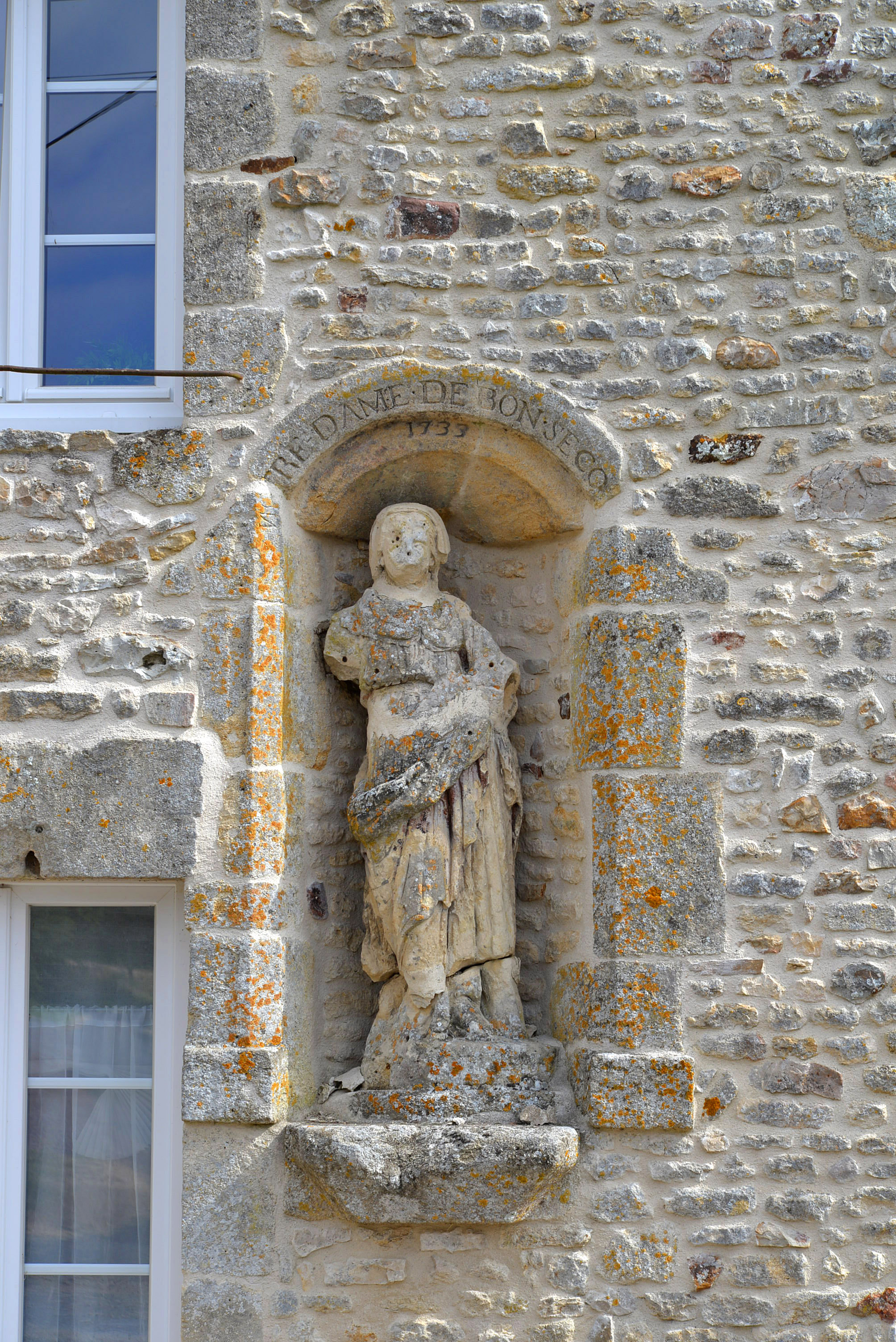
Statue of Notre-Dame de Bon Secours at Montabard

== See also ==
- Communes of the Orne department
