= John Eudes =

French Catholic priest (1601–1680)

Saint John Eudes CIM
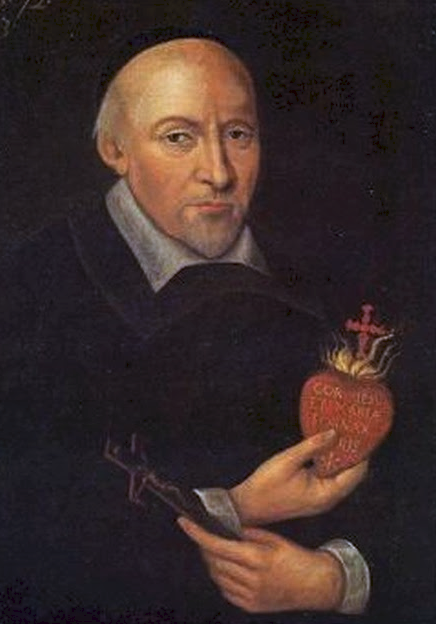
- Portrait of Saint John Eudes – 1673.

Confessor
- Born: 14 November 1601; Ri, Normandy, Kingdom of France
- Died: 19 August 1680 (aged 78); Caen, Normandy, Kingdom of France
- Venerated in: Catholic Church
- Beatified: 25 April 1909, Saint Peter's Basilica, Kingdom of Italy by Pope Pius X
- Canonized: 31 May 1925, Saint Peter's Basilica, Kingdom of Italy by Pope Pius XI
- Feast: 19 August
- Attributes: Priest's attire; Sacred Heart
- Patronage: Eudists; Order of Our Lady of Charity; Diocese of Baie-Comeau; Missionaries

John Eudes, CIM (French: Jean Eudes; 14 November 1601 – 19 August 1680) was a French Catholic priest and the founder of both the Order of Our Lady of Charity in 1641 and Congregation of Jesus and Mary, also known as the Eudists, in 1643. He was also a professed member of the Oratory of Jesus until 1643.

Eudes was the author of the propers for the Mass and Divine Office of the Sacred Heart of Jesus and the Immaculate Heart of Mary. He was an ardent proponent of the two devotions and dedicated himself to their promotion and celebration. The Masses he compiled for both Sacred Hearts were both first celebrated within his lifetime. He preached missions across France, including Paris and Versailles, while earning recognition as a popular evangelist and confessor. Eudes was also a prolific writer and wrote on the Sacred Hearts despite opposition from the Jansenists.

Eudes was canonised in 1925 and his supporters are now petitioning to have him named a Doctor of the Church.

== Life ==
=== Education ===
Jean Eudes was born on 14 November 1601 on a farm close to the village of Ri to Isaac Eudes (born circa 1566), a surgeon, and Martha Corbin; he had four sisters and two brothers, including the historian François Eudes de Mézeray (1610–10 July 1683). He made his First Communion on 26 May 1613 (Pentecost) and at age 14 took a private vow to remain chaste.

Eudes studied under the Jesuits at Caen before he decided to join the Oratorians on 25 March 1623. His masters and models in the spiritual life were Pierre de Bérulle (who welcomed him into the order) and the contemplative and ascetic Charles de Condren. As a student of de Bérulle, he became a member of the French school that promoted a Christocentric approach to spiritual affairs. This was characterised by a strong sense of adoration, plus pursuit of a personal relationship with Jesus Christ which extended to the Holy Spirit. Bishop Jacques Camus de Pontcarré ordained Eudes to the subdiaconate on 21 December 1624.

=== Priesthood ===
Eudes was ordained to the priesthood on 20 December 1625 and he celebrated his first Mass at Christmas. Almost immediately after his ordination, he came down with an illness that kept him bedridden until 1626. He was sent to Aubervilliers for his theological studies and returned to Séez in 1627. During severe plagues in 1627 and 1631, he volunteered to care for the stricken in his own diocese, administering the sacraments and ensuring the dead received a proper burial. He did this with the permission of his Oratorian superiors. To avoid infecting his colleagues during this time, he lived in a huge cask in the middle of a field.

In 1633 he began preaching parish missions, eventually preaching over a hundred missions throughout his own region as well as in Ile-de-France and Burgundy and also in Brittany. Jean-Jacques Olier referred to Eudes as "the prodigy of his age". Eudes became a noted preacher and confessor with a flair for evangelisation and his missions often lasted from several weeks to several months; he preached three in Paris and one in Versailles. Eudes even preached once for Anne of Austria, though her son King Louis XIV suspected that Eudes was hostile towards his Gallican policies. He was also quite concerned about the spiritual improvement of priests and realised that the seminaries needed improvement. He founded several seminaries in the region including in Rennes. In 1674 he received six papal bulls of indulgences from Pope Clement X for confraternities and seminaries dedicated to the Sacred Hearts.

=== Religious congregations ===
In his work he became disturbed when he saw the inadequate shelters for those prostitutes who sought to escape that life. Madeleine Lamy – who had cared for some of those women – came up to him on one occasion and challenged Eudes to address the issue. In 1641 he founded the Order of Our Lady of Charity of the Refuge in Caen to provide a refuge for prostitutes who wished to do penance. Three Visitation nuns came to his aid for a brief period and in 1644 a house was opened at Caen. Other ladies joined them and on 8 February 1651 the Bishop of Bayeux gave the institute his diocesan approbation. The congregation received papal approval from Pope Alexander VII on 2 January 1666. It later also included a convent from which Mary Euphrasia Pelletier established the Congregation of Our Lady of Charity of the Good Shepherd, in 1829.

With the support of Cardinal Richelieu and a number of individual bishops, he severed his connection with the Oratorians to establish the Eudists for the education of priests and for parish missions. This congregation was founded at Caen on 25 March 1643. Eudes also founded the Society of the Most Admirable Mother which acted as a sort of Third Order, and would later count among its members Jeanne Jugan and Amelie Fristel.

Eudes was influenced by the teachings of the French school, Francis de Sales, and the revelations of Gertrude the Great and Mechtilde. Bérulle's devotion to the Incarnate Word won him over and he combined with it the gentleness and devotional warmth of Francis de Sales. He changed the somewhat individual and private character of the devotion into a devotion for the whole church when he wrote for the benefit of his communities an Office and a Mass which later received approval from several bishops before spreading throughout the church. For this reason Pope Leo XIII – in proclaiming Eudes' heroic virtues later in 1903 – gave him the title of "Author of the Liturgical Worship of the Sacred Heart of Jesus and Holy Heart of Mary". Eudes dedicated the chapels of the Caen and Coutances seminaries to the Sacred Heart. The feast of the Immaculate Heart of the Mother of God was celebrated for the first time on 8 February 1648 and that of the Sacred Heart of Jesus on 20 October 1672 each as a double of the first class with an octave. He composed various rosaries and prayers dedicated to the Sacred Hearts. His book Le Cœur Admirable de la Très Sainte Mère de Dieu is the first book ever written on the devotion to the Sacred Hearts.

In 1671 there was a rumor that Eudes would be named as the Coadjutor Bishop of Evreux and that the king Louis XIV would support the nomination based on Eudes' reputation.

=== Death ===
Eudes died at Caen on 19 August 1680. He had drafted up his last will in April 1671 when his health started to decline. Eudes' remains were exhumed and transferred in 1810 and again for the last time on 6 March 1884.

== Spirituality ==
Eudes taught about the mystical unity of the Sacred Hearts of Jesus and Mary and wrote:

You must never separate what God has so perfectly united. So closely are Jesus and Mary bound up with each other that whoever beholds Jesus sees Mary; whoever loves Jesus, loves Mary; whoever has devotion to Jesus, has devotion to Mary.

The most striking characteristic of Eudes' teaching on Devotion to the Sacred Heart – as indeed of his whole teaching on the spiritual life – is that Christ is its centre at all times.

== Veneration ==
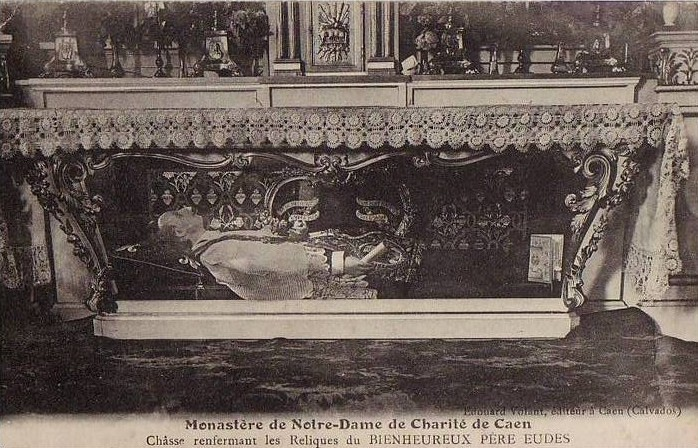
Shrine containing the relics of John Eudes in the monastery of Notre-Dame de Charité de Caen.

The cause for canonisation commenced in the Diocese of Séez in an informative process that commenced on 19 August 1868. The formal introduction to the cause came on 7 February 1874 under Pope Pius IX, who titled Eudes as a Servant of God. Pope Leo XIII later confirmed, on 6 January 1903, that Eudes had lived a life of heroic virtue and thus named him as Venerable. Pope Pius X later approved two miracles attributed to Eudes' intercession and beatified him on 25 April 1909 in Saint Peter's Basilica. The ratification of two more miracles enabled Pope Pius XI to preside over Eudes' canonisation on 31 May 1925.

Pope Benedict XVI – in his General Audience catechesis on 19 August 2009 – praised Eudes as a "tireless apostle of the devotion of the Sacred Hearts" noting that Eudes was an example for priests during the Year for Priests. The pope went on to describe Eudes' "apostolic zeal" in the formation of seminarians into priests as well as the fact that Eudes was a model for evangelisation and witness to the "love for Christ's Heart and Mary's Heart".

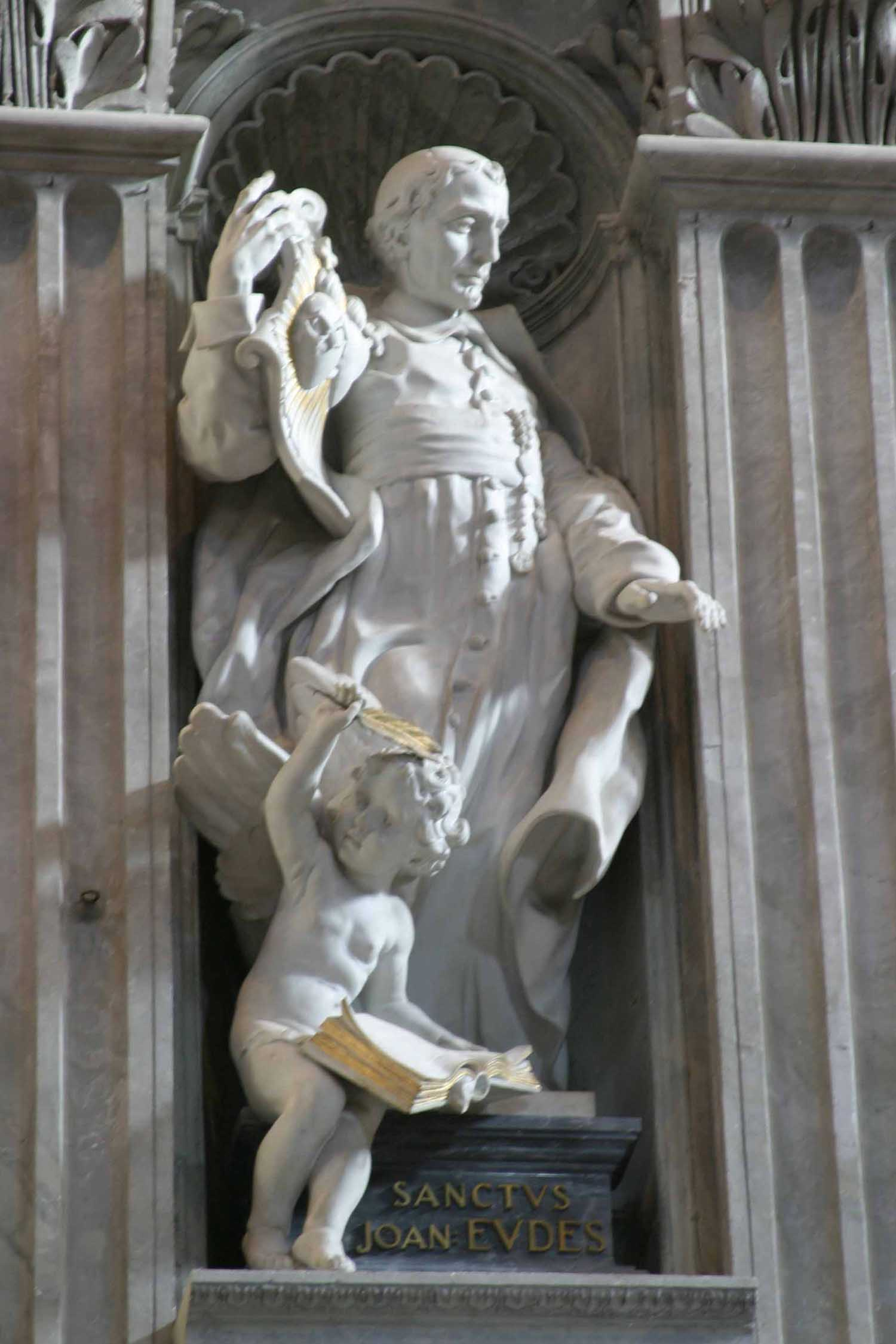
Sculpture of John Eudes at St. Peter's Basilica which has been in place since 1932.

Saint Peter's Basilica features a statue portraying (and dedicated to) Eudes constructed by Silvio Silva in 1932. It is located on the right side of the central nave.

=== Doctor of the Church ===
His supporters first proposed the idea to have Eudes named as a Doctor of the Church around the time of World War II, though the conflict and then the course of the Second Vatican Council caused the suspension of inquiries into such a path.

Both the Congregation of Jesus and Mary and the Congregation of Our Lady of Charity of the Good Shepherd have introduced the Cause of their Founder Saint John Eudes (1601–1680) for a Doctorate. In the course of 2014–15, the episcopal conferences of France, Mexico, Venezuela, Ecuador, Benin, Honduras, and Colombia gave their full support to this proposal. The plenary session of the French Episcopal Conference on 8 November 2014 confirmed its support for the cause of Eudes as a Doctor of the Church. On 3 December 2016 the then-Superior General of the Eudists Camilo Bernal Hadad and the Bishop of Le Puy-en-Velay Luc Crépy met with Pope Francis to discuss the idea.

Those managing the process collected evidence needed to support the idea and compiled it into a Positio dossier, which included the reasons for the proposal as well as those spiritual works that would support it. This dossier was submitted to the Congregation for the Causes of Saints in April 2017 for them to evaluate.

== Works ==
Eudes wrote a number of books. His principal works are:

- La Vie et le Royaume de Jésus (The Life and Kingdom of Jesus – 1637)
- Le contrat de l'homme avec Dieu par le Saint Baptême (Contract of Man with God Through Holy Baptism – 1654)
- Le Bon Confesseur (The Good Confessor – 1666)
- Le Mémorial de la vie Ecclésiastique
- Le Prédicateur Apostolique
- Le Cœur Admirable de la Très Sainte Mère de Dieu (the first book ever written on the devotion to the Sacred Hearts)

== See also ==
- Consecration and entrustment to Mary
- Saint John Eudes, Patron Archive
