= Congregation of Jesus and Mary =

Roman Catholic society of apostolic life

- Congregatio Iesu et Mariae
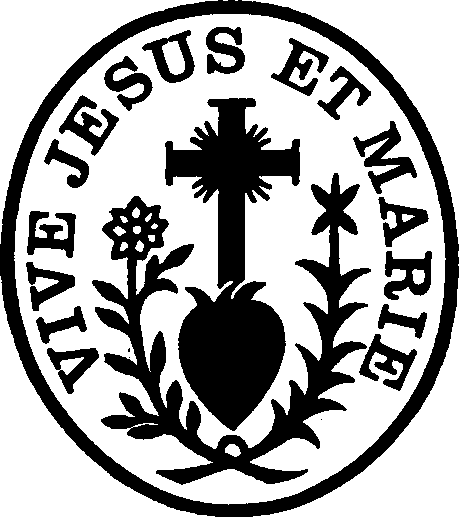
- Abbreviation: CIM, CJM
- Nickname: Eudists
- Formation: 25 March 1643; 383 years ago
- Founder: Saint John Eudes, C.I.M.
- Founded at: Caen, Normandy, France
- Type: Society of Apostolic Life of Pontifical Right for men
- Headquarters: Via dei Querceti 15, Rome, Italy
- Members: 492 members (includes 361 priests) (2020) (2020)
- Superior General: Fr. Jean-Michel Amouriaux, C.I.M.
- Website: eudistes.org

The Congregation of Jesus and Mary (Latin: Congregatio Iesu et Mariae), abbreviated CIM or (CJM) also known as the Eudists (Latin: Congregatio Eudistarum), is a society of apostolic life of Pontifical Right for men in the Catholic Church. It was established on March 25, 1643 by Saint Fr. John Eudes, C.I.M.

== History ==
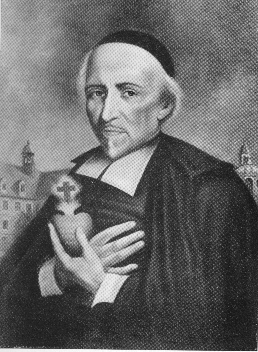
John Eudes

The Congregation of Jesus and Mary was instituted at Caen, in Normandy, France, on 25 March 1643 by Oratorian Jean Eudes. The principal works of the Congregation were the education of priests in seminaries and the giving of parish missions.

To develop the spirit of Jesus Christ in the members of the Congregation, Father Eudes institutionalized the celebration every year in his seminaries the feast of the Holy Priesthood of Jesus Christ and of all Holy Priests and Levites. After the feast of the Sacred Heart of Jesus and Mary it is the second most important feast celebrated by the community. The solemnity begins on 13 November, and thus serves as a preparation for the renewal of the clerical promises on 21 November, the feast of the Presentation of the Blessed Virgin. As early as 1649 Father Eudes had prepared an Office proper to the feast. Some years later the feast and office were adopted by the Sulpician Fathers.

During the lifetime of Father Eudes, the congregation founded seminaries in France at Caen (1643), Coutances (1650), Lisieux (1653), Rouen (1658), Évreux (1667), and Rennes (1670). These were all "grand" or "major"seminaries; Father Eudes never thought of founding any other. He admitted, however, besides clerical students, priests with newly granted benefices who came for further study, those who wished to make retreats, and even lay students who followed the courses of the Faculty of Theology.

After his death, directors were appointed for the seminaries of Valognes, Avranches, Dol, Senlis, Blois, Domfront, and Séez. At Rennes, Rouen, and some other cities, seminaries were operated for students of poorer class who were called to exercise the ministry in country places. These were sometimes called "little" seminaries. The postulants were admitted early and made both secular and ecclesiastical studies.

The French Revolution abolished Catholic apostolates throughout the country and appropriated much of their property. Three Eudists, Fathers Hébert, Claude Pottier, and Jacques-François Lefranc, were killed at Paris during the September Massacres of 1792. They were later beatified by Pope Pius XI in 1926.

Too late to take over again the direction of seminaries formerly theirs, the Eudists entered upon missionary work and secondary education in colleges. The "Law of Associations" (1906) brought about the ruin of the establishments which they had in France.

=== Post-revolution ===
Besides the scholasticates that they opened in Belgium and in Spain, the Eudists directed in the early 20th century seminaries at Cartagena, at Antioquia, at Pamplona, at Panama (South America), and at San Domingo, West Indies. In Canada they had the Vicariate Apostolic of the Gulf of St. Lawrence, a seminary at Halifax, Nova Scotia, a college at Church Point, N.S., and at Caraquet, New Brunswick, and a number of other less important establishments. The North American province is based in Quebec.

==== United States ====
In 1947, the order acquired the Langley Park mansion in Langley Park, Maryland, and operated a seminary there until 1963. The San Diego Local Community includes Carlsbad, Vista, and Solana Beach, California, where they have charge of the parish of St.James/St. Leo.

And in 2005 the Congregation opened its first community in Asia in Tagaytay, Philippines. From there they moved to Quezon City (by Ateneo de Manila University) where they have their house of formation Saint John Eudes. They also have a retreat house in Taytay, Rizal, from which Eudists help with ministry and retreats in numerous parishes.

== Canonical status and organization ==
The purpose which Father Eudes assigned to his congregation made him decide not to introduce religious vows. Although not a religious order, the Congregation of Jesus and Mary is subject to discipline that does not differ from that of religious orders with simple vows. The administration is modelled on that of the Oratorians to which Eudes had belonged for twenty years. The supreme authority resides in a general assembly that names the superior general, elected for five years. He has the right to name and depose local superiors, to fix the personnel of each house, to make the annual visit, to admit and if necessary dismiss subjects, to accept or to give up foundations, and, in general, to perform or at least authorize all important acts. He is aided by assistants named by the general assembly, who have a deciding vote in temporal affairs and only a consulting in other questions.

The world headquarters are in Rome. In 2020 the superior general was Rev. Fr. Jean-Michel Amouriaux, CJM. As of 2023, about 500 Eudists serve in seventeen countries.

== Apostolates ==
The Eudists are an international society of apostolic life of priests, deacons, and laypeople who share their prayer life, experiences, and apostolic commitments. Through their apostolates, they are involved in: seminaries, formation of the laity, chaplaincies, Catholic education, parishes, spiritual centers, etc.

The Province of France operates the Foyer Saint Jean Eudes, a guesthouse for people coming to Paris for university studies, or to participate in meetings or conferences organized by the bishops of France, Catholic education, or a Christian association.

== Saints, Blesseds, and other holy people ==
Saints

- Jean Eudes (14 November 1601 – 19 August 1680), founder of the Congregation, canonized on 31 May 1925

Blesseds

- François-Louis Hébert (14 September 1735 – 2 September 1792), Martyr of the French Revolution, beatified on 17 October 1926
- François Lefranc (26 March 1739 – 2 September 1792), Martyr of the French Revolution, beatified on 17 October 1926
- Pierre-Claude Pottier (20 September 1743 – 3 September 1792), Martyr of the French Revolution, beatified on 17 October 1926
- Charles-Antoine-Nicolas Ancel (11 October 1763 - 29 July 1794), Martyr of the French Revolution, beatified on 1 October 1995

Servants of God

- Rafael García Herreros Unda (17 January 1909 - 24 November 1992), priest, declared as Servant of God on 15 August 2013
- Miguel Antonio Salas Salas (29 September 1915 - 30 October 2003), Archbishop of Mérida, declared as Servant of God in 2013

== See also ==
- Institutes of consecrated life
- Religious institute (Catholic)
- Vocational Discernment in the Catholic Church
