= Le Plantis =

- Commune
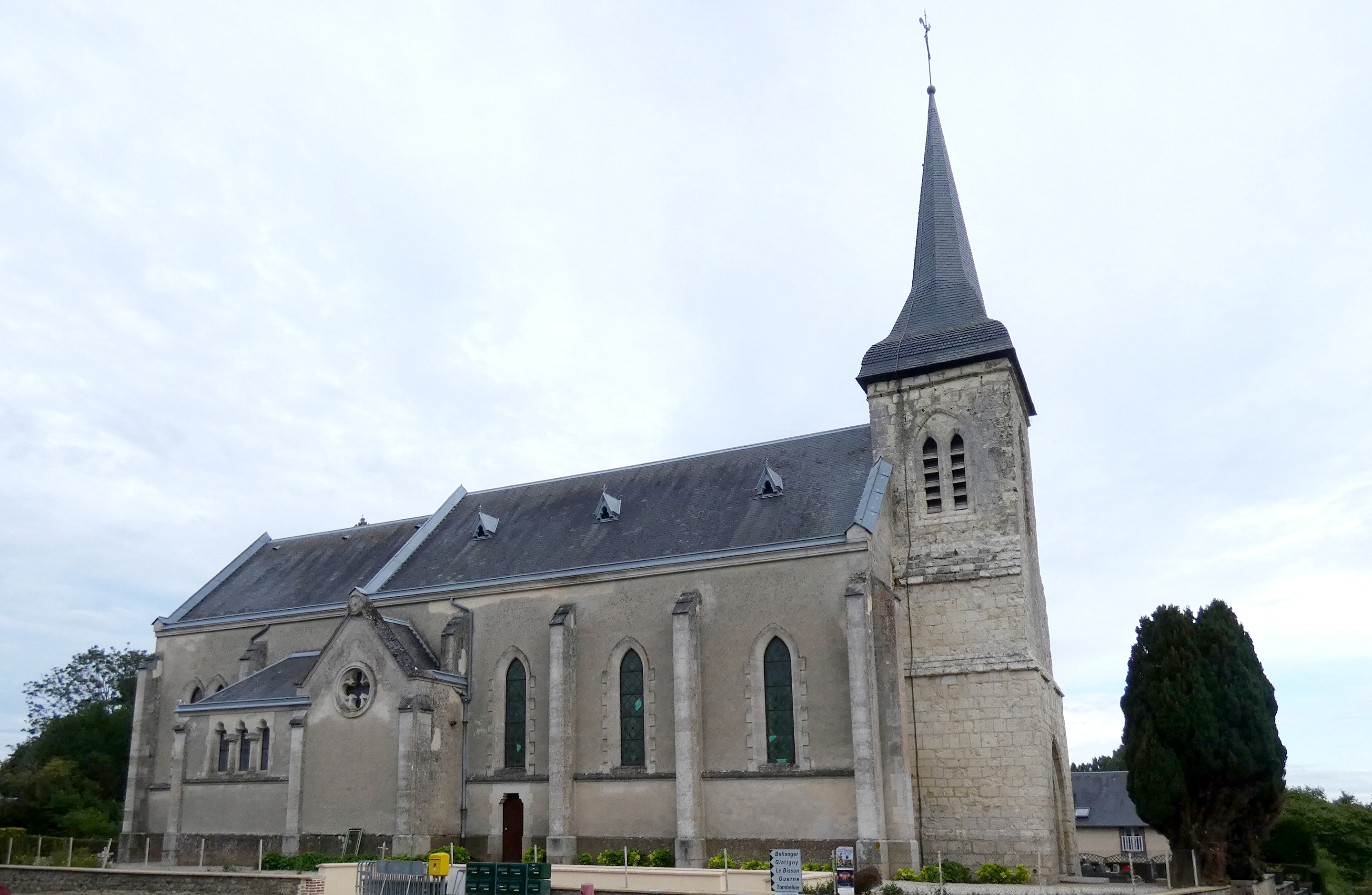
- Location of Le Plantis
- Location within France Location within Normandy
- Coordinates: 48°36′06″N 0°22′56″E
- Country: France
- Region: Normandy
- Department: Orne
- Arrondissement: Alençon
- Canton: Écouves
- Intercommunality: Vallée de la Haute Sarthe

Government
  - Mayor (2020–2026): Eric Liger
- Area^{1}: 8.02 km^{2} (3.10 sq mi)
- Elevation: 175 m (574 ft)
- Highest elevation: 243 m (797 ft)
- Lowest elevation: 163 m (535 ft)
- Population (2023): 125
  - Density: 15.6/km^{2} (40.4/sq mi)
- Demonym: Plantisiens
- Time zone: UTC+01:00 (CET)
  - Summer (DST): UTC+02:00 (CEST)
- INSEE/Postal code: 61331 /61170
- ^{1} French Land Register data, which excludes lakes, ponds, glaciers > 1 km^{2} (0.386 sq mi or 247 acres) and river estuaries.

Le Plantis (French pronunciation: [lə plɑ̃ti]) is a commune in the Orne department in north-western France.

== Geography ==
The commune is made up of the following collection of villages and hamlets, La Maison aux Fèvres, Jouet, Lhomas, Guerne, La Brosse, Le Plantis, Clairefeuille, and Glatigny.

The commune, along with another 32 communes, is part of a 3,503 hectare, Natura 2000 conservation area, called the Haute vallée de la Sarthe.

The Sarthe river flows through the commune. In addition, three other watercourses flow through the commune, two rivers the La Fresbee & le Guerne, plus a stream Ruisseau de loisellière.

== See also ==
- Communes of the Orne department
