= Saint-Léonard-des-Parcs =

- Commune
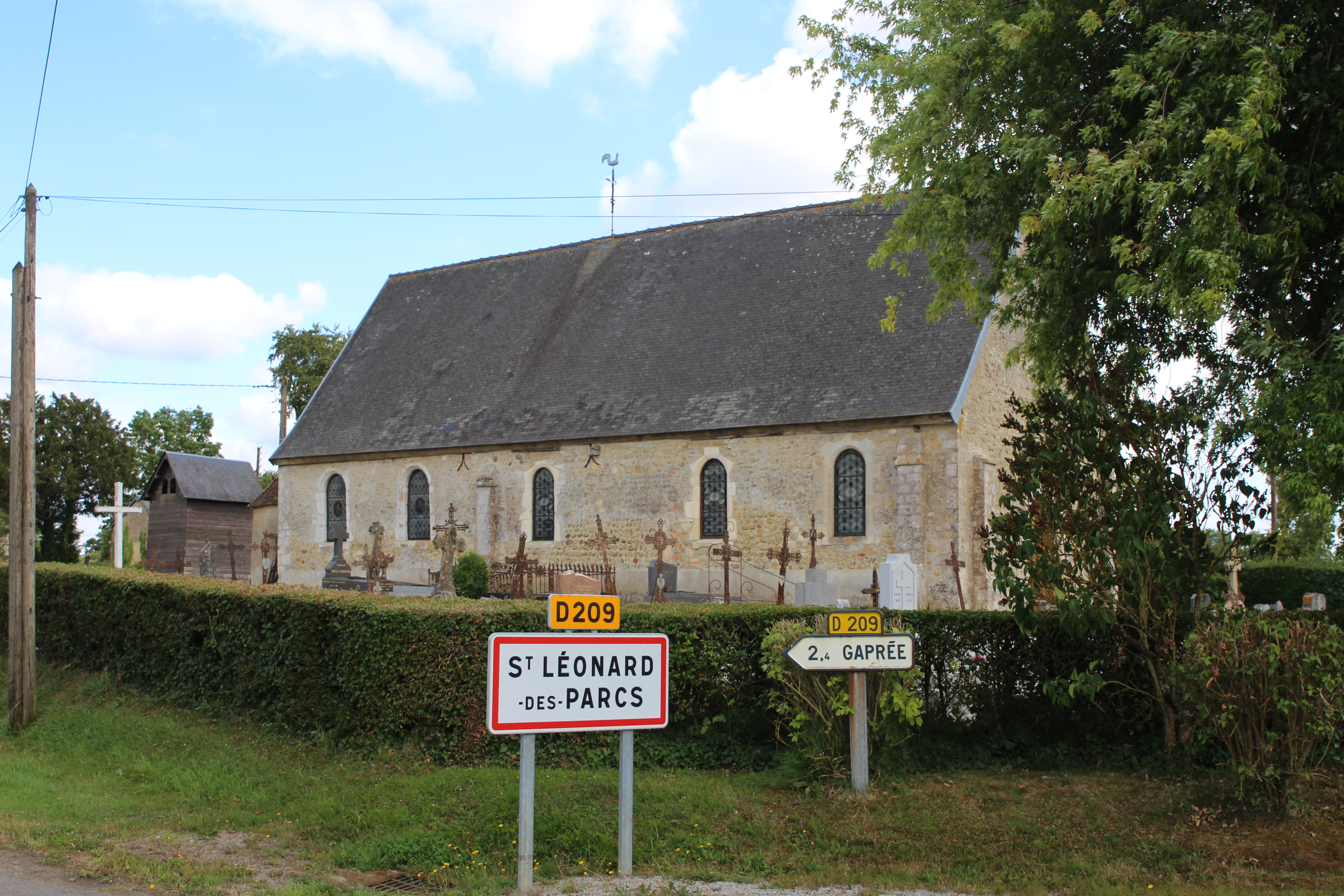
- Saint-Léonard Church in Saint-Léonard-des-Parcs
- Location of Saint-Léonard-des-Parcs
- Location within France Location within Normandy
- Coordinates: 48°38′35″N 0°17′15″E
- Country: France
- Region: Normandy
- Department: Orne
- Arrondissement: Alençon
- Canton: Écouves

Government
  - Mayor (2021–2026): Patrice Hesloin
- Area^{1}: 13.40 km^{2} (5.17 sq mi)
- Elevation: 180 m (590 ft)
- Highest elevation: 225 m (738 ft)
- Lowest elevation: 180 m (590 ft)
- Population (2023): 75
  - Density: 5.6/km^{2} (14/sq mi)
- Time zone: UTC+01:00 (CET)
  - Summer (DST): UTC+02:00 (CEST)
- INSEE/Postal code: 61416 /61390
- ^{1} French Land Register data, which excludes lakes, ponds, glaciers > 1 km^{2} (0.386 sq mi or 247 acres) and river estuaries.

Saint-Léonard-des-Parcs is a commune in the Orne department in north-western France.

== Geography ==
Saint-Léonard-des-Parcs along with another 65 communes is part of a 20,593 hectare, Natura 2000 conservation area, called the Haute vallée de l'Orne et affluents.

The river Don passes through the commune. In addition another river La Senelle, plus four streams the Monts Damain, Ruisseau des Veaux Massees, Ruisseau des Gouffres & Ruisseau de la Genevraie flow through the commune.

== See also ==
- Communes of the Orne department
