= Trémont, Orne =

Trémont
- Commune
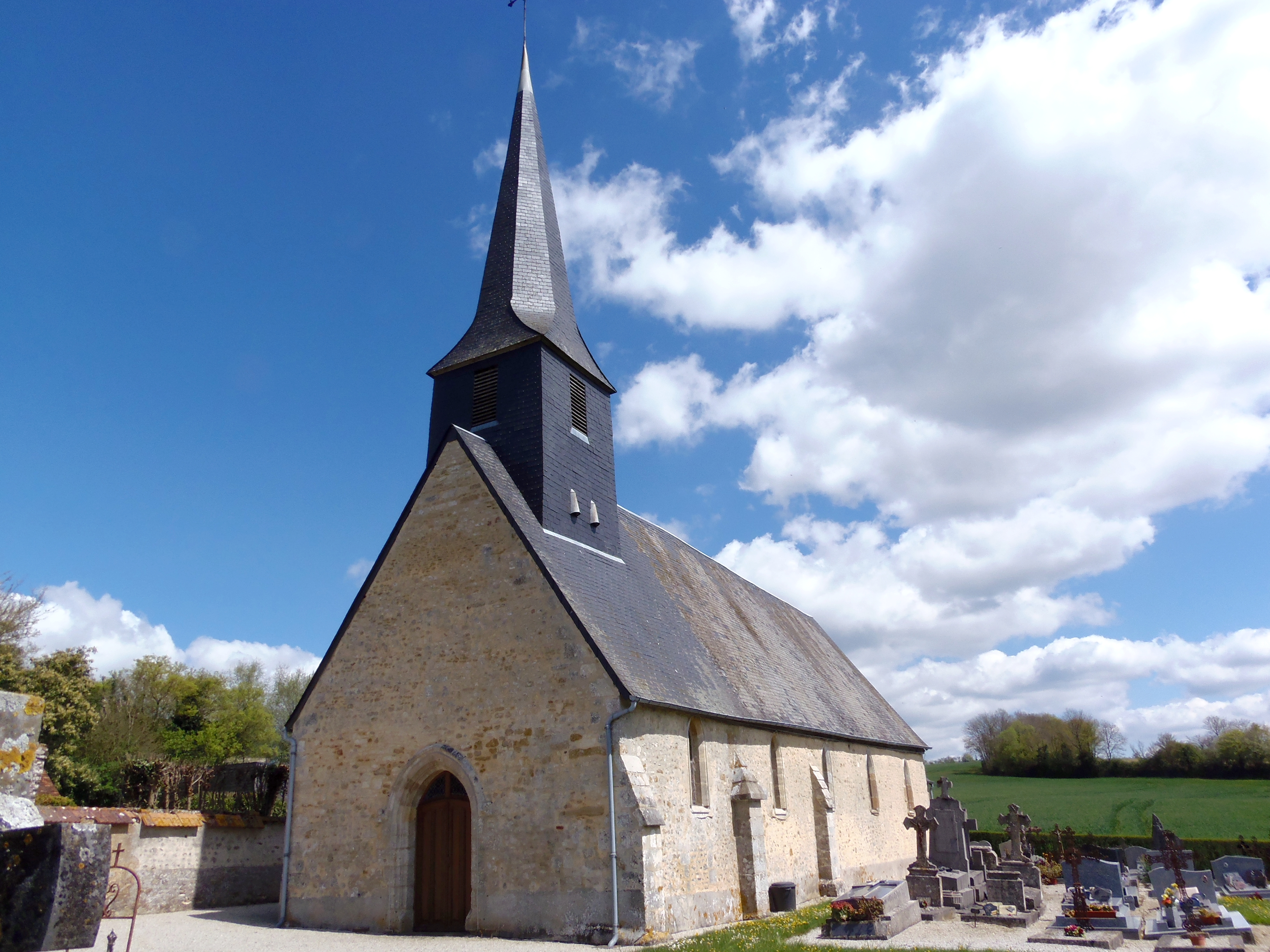
- The church in Trémont
- Location of Trémont
- Location within France Location within Normandy
- Coordinates: 48°36′08″N 0°16′30″E
- Country: France
- Region: Normandy
- Department: Orne
- Arrondissement: Alençon
- Canton: Écouves
- Intercommunality: Vallée de la Haute Sarthe

Government
  - Mayor (2020–2026): Guillaume Pottier
- Area^{1}: 6.22 km^{2} (2.40 sq mi)
- Elevation: 200 m (660 ft)
- Highest elevation: 240 m (790 ft)
- Lowest elevation: 173 m (568 ft)
- Population (2023): 122
  - Density: 19.6/km^{2} (50.8/sq mi)
- Time zone: UTC+01:00 (CET)
  - Summer (DST): UTC+02:00 (CEST)
- INSEE/Postal code: 61492 /61390
- ^{1} French Land Register data, which excludes lakes, ponds, glaciers > 1 km^{2} (0.386 sq mi or 247 acres) and river estuaries.

Trémont (French pronunciation: [tʁemɔ̃]) is a commune in the Orne department in north-western France.

== Geography ==
Trémont along with another 65 communes is part of a 20,593 hectare, Natura 2000 conservation area, called the Haute vallée de l'Orne et affluents.

A river, La Vézone, flows through the commune.

== Points of Interest ==
Jardin de la Folêterie is a 6000m² floral garden open to the public a few months a year.

== See also ==
- Communes of the Orne department
