= Neuilly-le-Bisson =

- Commune
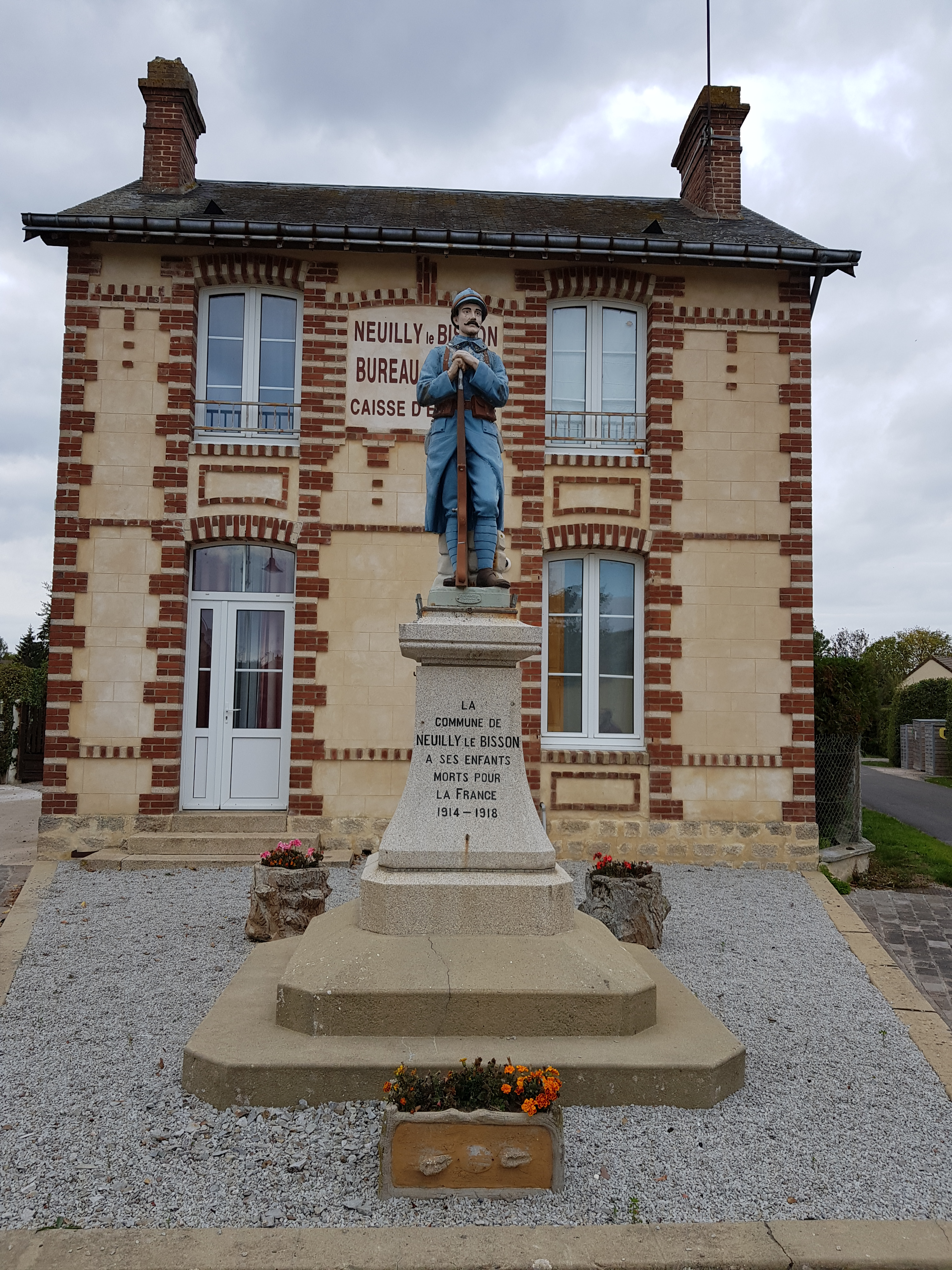
- The town hall and war memorial in Neuilly-le-Bisson

- Coat of arms
- Location of Neuilly-le-Bisson
- Location within France Location within Normandy
- Coordinates: 48°30′01″N 0°14′02″E
- Country: France
- Region: Normandy
- Department: Orne
- Arrondissement: Alençon
- Canton: Écouves
- Intercommunality: Vallée de la Haute Sarthe

Government
  - Mayor (2020–2026): Bertrand Detroussel
- Area^{1}: 5.98 km^{2} (2.31 sq mi)
- Elevation: 140 m (460 ft)
- Highest elevation: 161 m (528 ft)
- Lowest elevation: 137 m (449 ft)
- Population (2023): 276
  - Density: 46.2/km^{2} (120/sq mi)
- Time zone: UTC+01:00 (CET)
  - Summer (DST): UTC+02:00 (CEST)
- INSEE/Postal code: 61304 /61250
- ^{1} French Land Register data, which excludes lakes, ponds, glaciers > 1 km^{2} (0.386 sq mi or 247 acres) and river estuaries.

Neuilly-le-Bisson (French pronunciation: [nœji lə bisɔ̃]) is a commune in the Orne department in north-western France.

== Geography ==
Neuilly-le-Bisson is made up of the following collection of villages and hamlets, Le Friche, Les Aigremonts, La Pilottière and Neuilly-le-Bisson.

The commune is in the Normandie-Maine Regional Natural Park.

A river, La Vézone, flows through the commune.

== See also ==
- Communes of the Orne department
- Parc naturel régional Normandie-Maine
