= Saint-Léger-sur-Sarthe =

- Commune
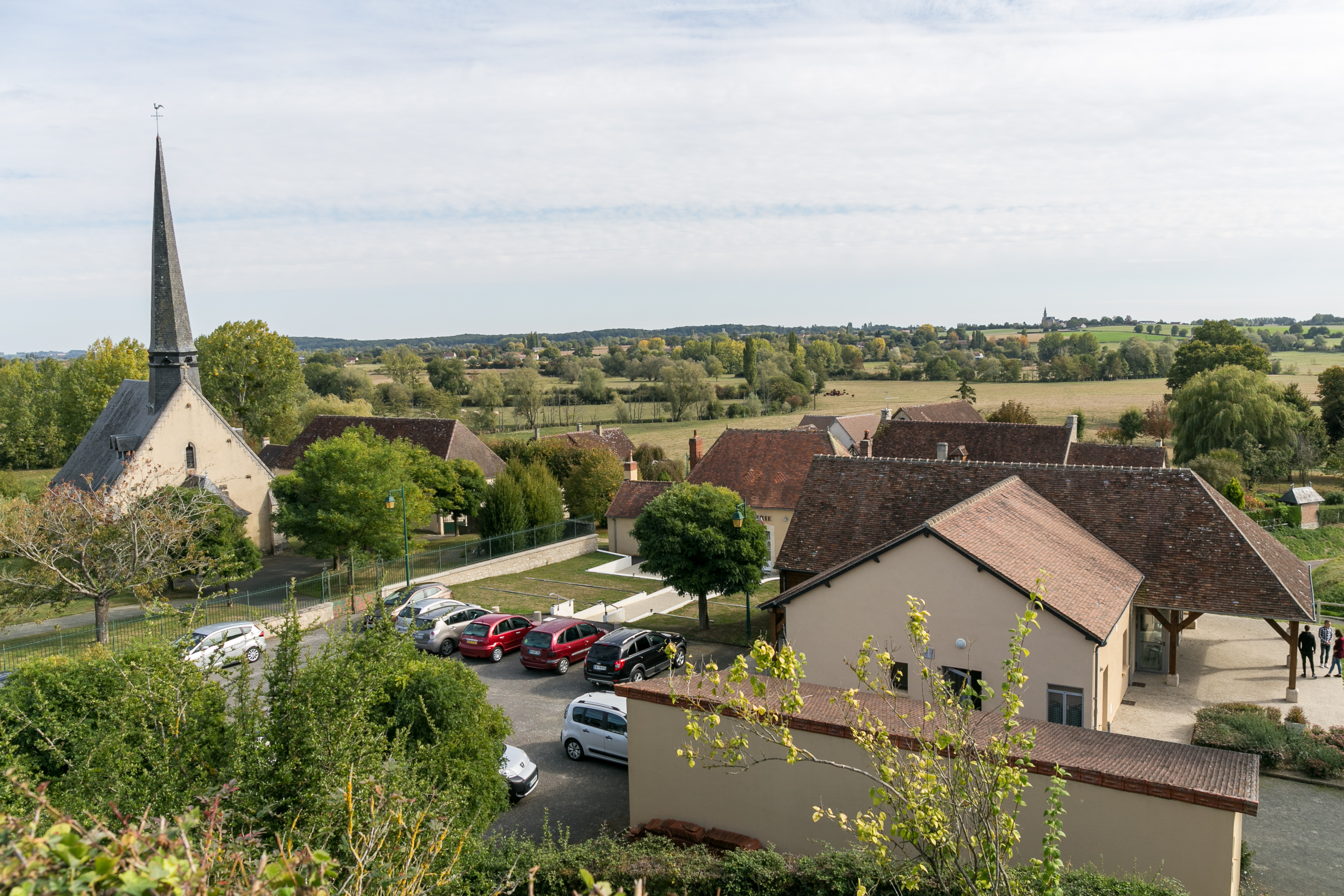
- Location of Saint-Léger-sur-Sarthe
- Location within France Location within Normandy
- Coordinates: 48°30′18″N 0°20′30″E
- Country: France
- Region: Normandy
- Department: Orne
- Arrondissement: Alençon
- Canton: Écouves

Government
  - Mayor (2020–2026): Didier Rattier
- Area^{1}: 13.25 km^{2} (5.12 sq mi)
- Elevation: 155 m (509 ft)
- Highest elevation: 171 m (561 ft)
- Lowest elevation: 138 m (453 ft)
- Population (2023): 320
  - Density: 24/km^{2} (63/sq mi)
- Time zone: UTC+01:00 (CET)
  - Summer (DST): UTC+02:00 (CEST)
- INSEE/Postal code: 61415 /61170
- ^{1} French Land Register data, which excludes lakes, ponds, glaciers > 1 km^{2} (0.386 sq mi or 247 acres) and river estuaries.

Saint-Léger-sur-Sarthe (French pronunciation: [sɛ̃ leʒe syʁ saʁt], literally Saint-Léger on Sarthe) is a commune in the Orne department in north-western France.

== Geography ==
The commune along with another 32 communes is part of a 3,503 hectare, Natura 2000 conservation area, called the Haute vallée de la Sarthe.

Two Rivers the Sarthe and la Tanche flow through the commune.

The commune is in the Normandie-Maine Regional Natural Park.

== See also ==
- Communes of the Orne department
- Parc naturel régional Normandie-Maine
