= Ménil-Erreux =

- Commune
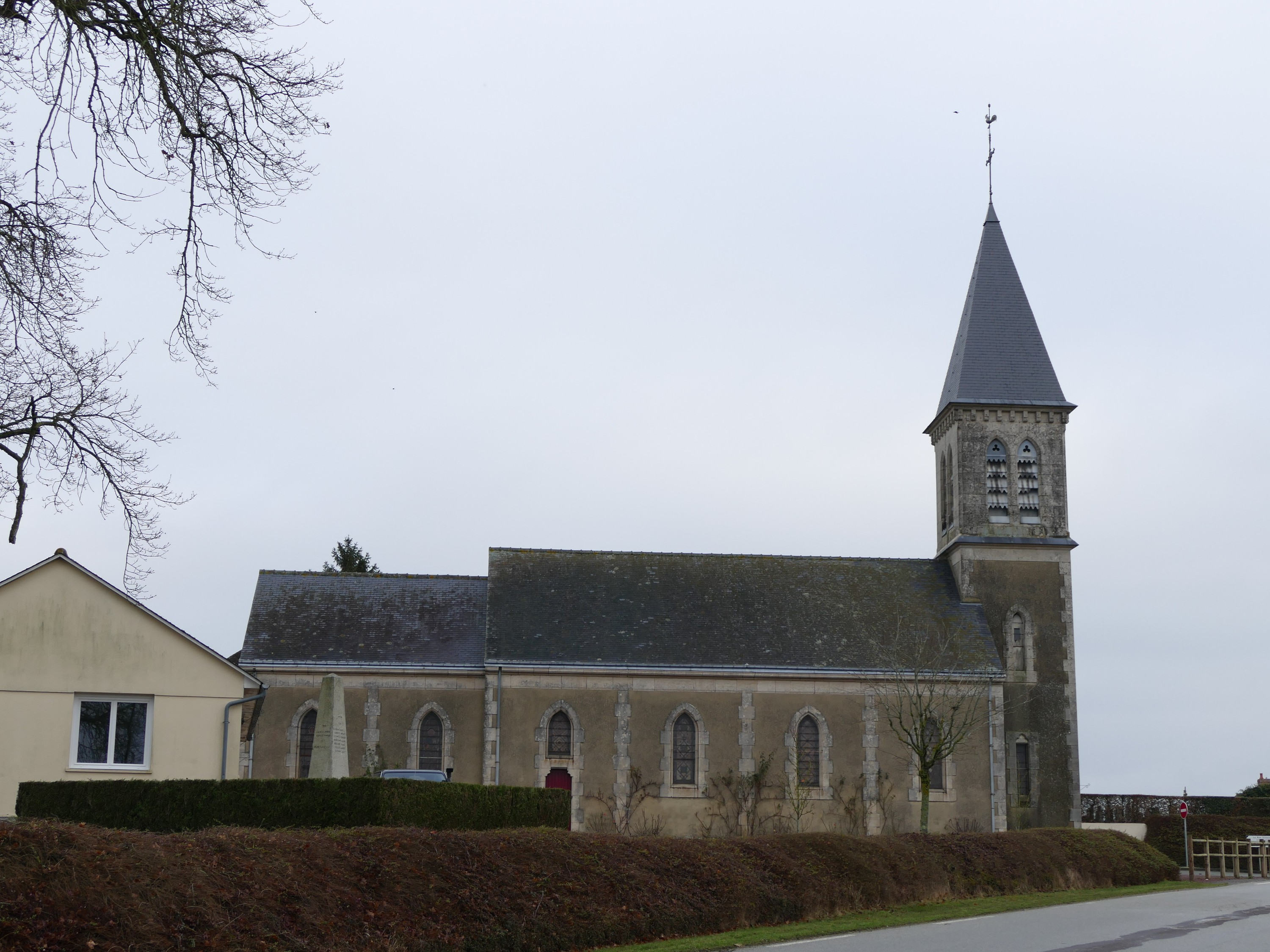
- The church in Ménil-Erreux
- Location of Ménil-Erreux
- Location within France Location within Normandy
- Coordinates: 48°30′28″N 0°11′21″E
- Country: France
- Region: Normandy
- Department: Orne
- Arrondissement: Alençon
- Canton: Écouves
- Intercommunality: CU Alençon

Government
  - Mayor (2020–2026): Jérôme Larchevêque
- Area^{1}: 11.05 km^{2} (4.27 sq mi)
- Elevation: 160 m (520 ft)
- Highest elevation: 181 m (594 ft)
- Lowest elevation: 140 m (460 ft)
- Population (2023): 204
  - Density: 18.5/km^{2} (47.8/sq mi)
- Time zone: UTC+01:00 (CET)
  - Summer (DST): UTC+02:00 (CEST)
- INSEE/Postal code: 61263 /61250
- ^{1} French Land Register data, which excludes lakes, ponds, glaciers > 1 km^{2} (0.386 sq mi or 247 acres) and river estuaries.

Ménil-Erreux (French pronunciation: [menil ɛʁø]) is a commune in the Orne department in north-western France.

== Geography ==
The commune is made up of the following collection of villages and hamlets, Ménil-Erreux and La Normanderie.

The commune is in the Normandie-Maine Regional Natural Park.

Two watercourses perambulate through the commune le Péroncel and la Forêt.

== Points of interest ==
=== National heritage sites ===
- Normanderie farm a nineteenth century farm, that was registered as a Monument historique in 2005.

== See also ==
- Communes of the Orne department
- Parc naturel régional Normandie-Maine
