= Marchemaisons =

- Commune
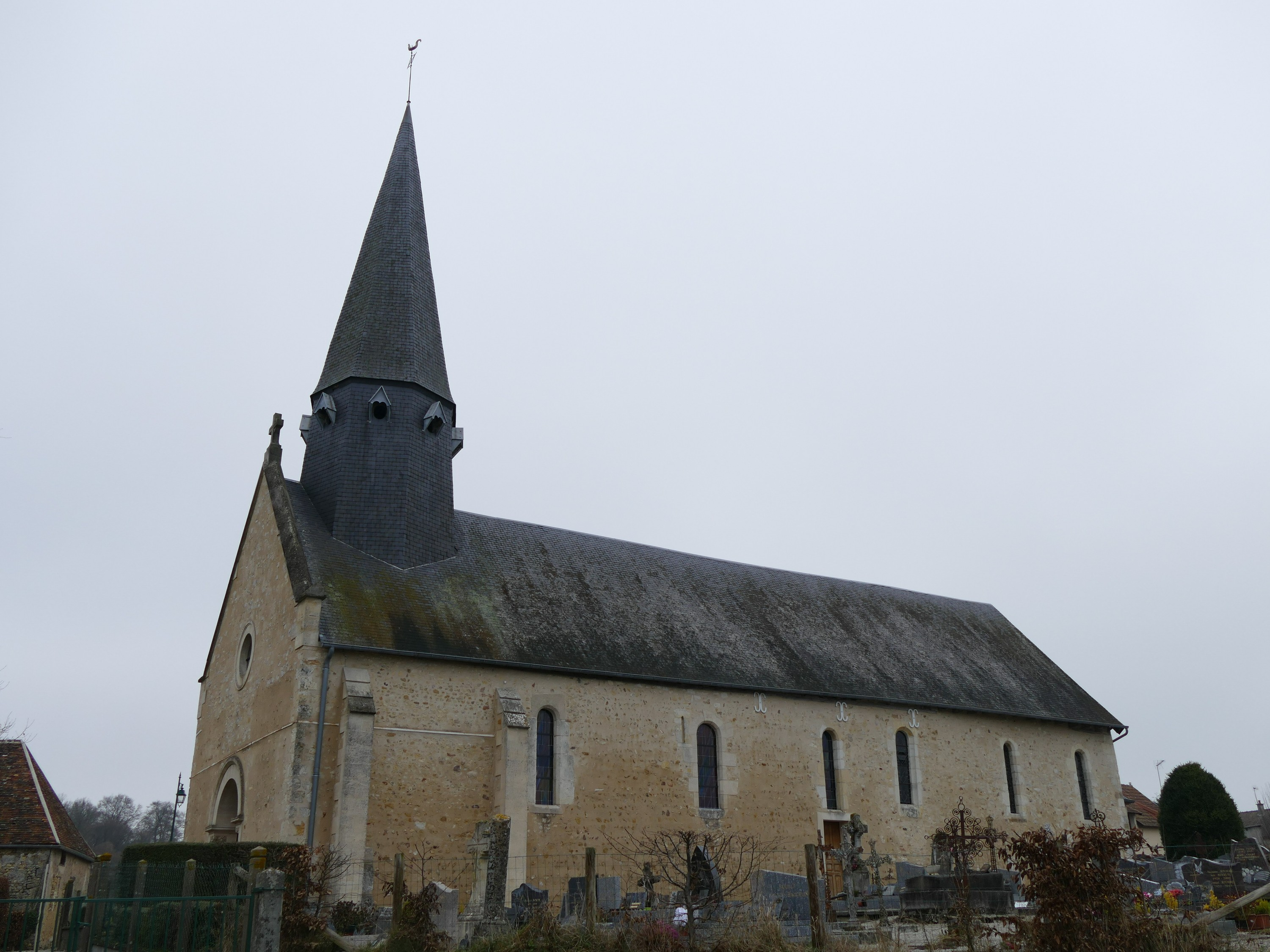
- The church in Marchemaisons
- Location of Marchemaisons
- Location within France Location within Normandy
- Coordinates: 48°31′21″N 0°18′15″E
- Country: France
- Region: Normandy
- Department: Orne
- Arrondissement: Alençon
- Canton: Écouves
- Intercommunality: Vallée de la Haute Sarthe

Government
  - Mayor (2020–2026): Romuald Adamiec
- Area^{1}: 8.85 km^{2} (3.42 sq mi)
- Elevation: 155 m (509 ft)
- Highest elevation: 207 m (679 ft)
- Lowest elevation: 142 m (466 ft)
- Population (2023): 162
  - Density: 18.3/km^{2} (47.4/sq mi)
- Time zone: UTC+01:00 (CET)
  - Summer (DST): UTC+02:00 (CEST)
- INSEE/Postal code: 61251 /61170
- ^{1} French Land Register data, which excludes lakes, ponds, glaciers > 1 km^{2} (0.386 sq mi or 247 acres) and river estuaries.

Marchemaisons (French pronunciation: [maʁʃəmɛzɔ̃]) is a commune in the Orne department in north-western France.

== Geography ==
Marchemaisons is made up of the following collection of villages and hamlets, La Couture, Marchemaisons, La Broudière and La Trotterie.

A river, la Tanche flows through the commune, in addition to one of its tributaries Le Quincampoix.

The commune is in the Normandie-Maine Regional Natural Park.

== See also ==
- Communes of the Orne department
- Parc naturel régional Normandie-Maine
