= Saint-Quentin-de-Blavou =

- Commune
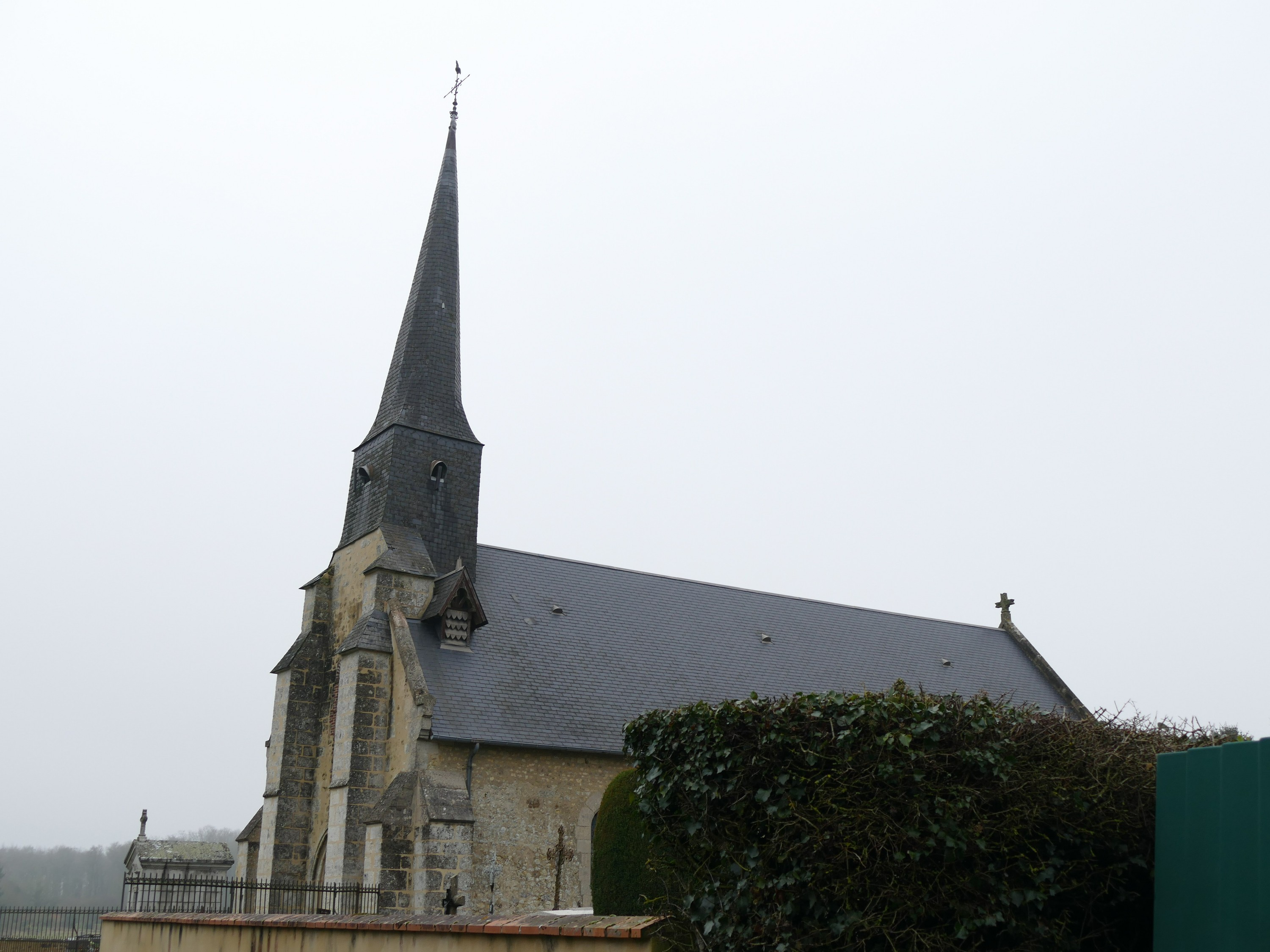
- The church in Saint-Quentin-de-Blavou
- Location of Saint-Quentin-de-Blavou
- Location within France Location within Normandy
- Coordinates: 48°28′16″N 0°25′05″E
- Country: France
- Region: Normandy
- Department: Orne
- Arrondissement: Alençon
- Canton: Écouves

Government
  - Mayor (2020–2026): Pierre Capron
- Area^{1}: 16.46 km^{2} (6.36 sq mi)
- Elevation: 218 m (715 ft)
- Highest elevation: 217 m (712 ft)
- Lowest elevation: 151 m (495 ft)
- Population (2023): 80
  - Density: 4.9/km^{2} (13/sq mi)
- Time zone: UTC+01:00 (CET)
  - Summer (DST): UTC+02:00 (CEST)
- INSEE/Postal code: 61450 /61360
- ^{1} French Land Register data, which excludes lakes, ponds, glaciers > 1 km^{2} (0.386 sq mi or 247 acres) and river estuaries.

Saint-Quentin-de-Blavou (French pronunciation: [sɛ̃ kɑ̃tɛ̃ də blavu]) is a commune in the Orne department in north-western France.

== Geography ==
The river l'Erine traverses through the commune.

== See also ==
- Communes of the Orne department
