= Sainte-Scolasse-sur-Sarthe =

- Commune
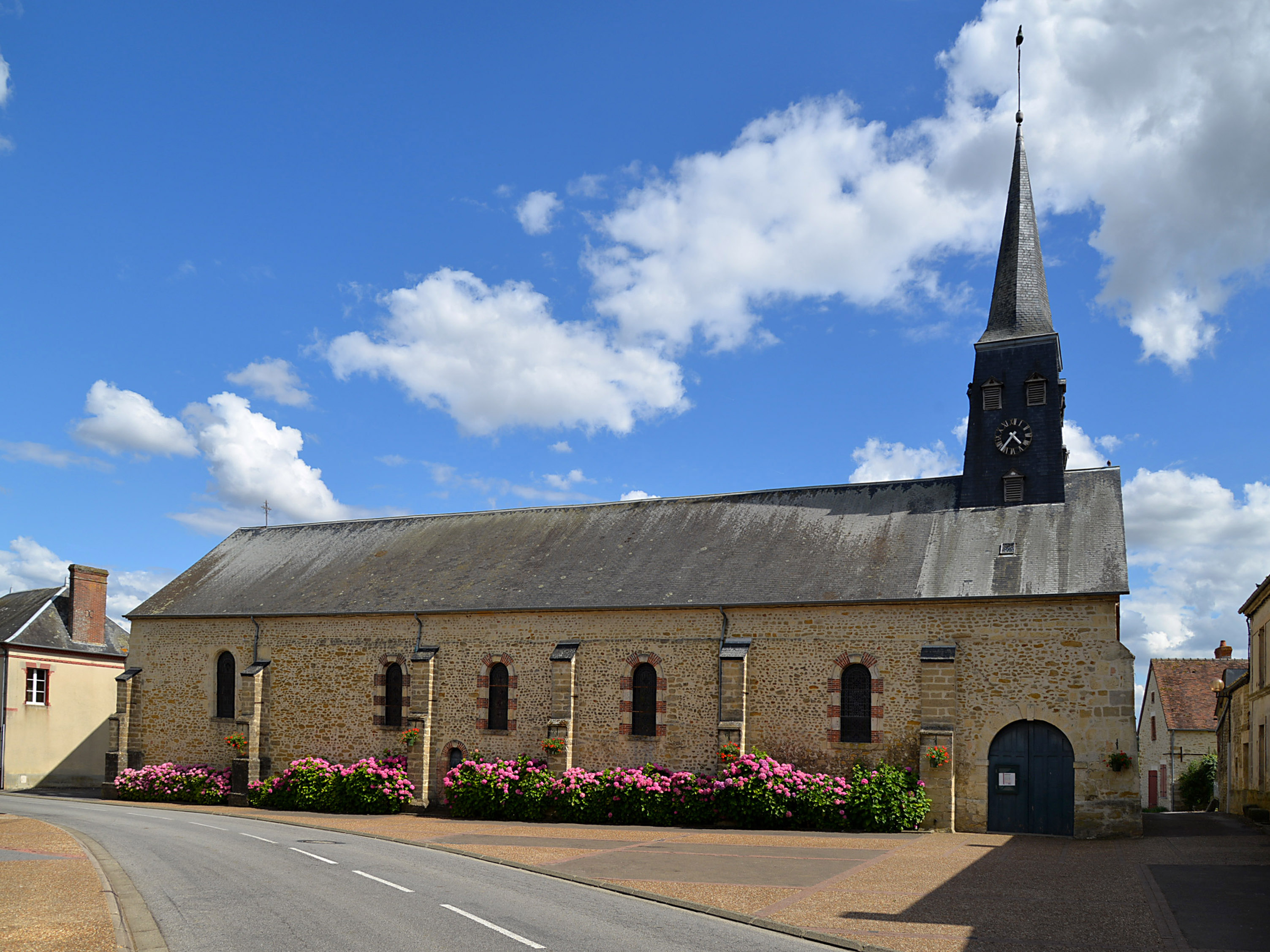
- The church in Sainte-Scolasse-sur-Sarthe
- Location of Sainte-Scolasse-sur-Sarthe
- Location within France Location within Normandy
- Coordinates: 48°34′42″N 0°23′35″E
- Country: France
- Region: Normandy
- Department: Orne
- Arrondissement: Alençon
- Canton: Écouves

Government
  - Mayor (2020–2026): Lucette Beaudoire
- Area^{1}: 13.88 km^{2} (5.36 sq mi)
- Elevation: 183 m (600 ft)
- Highest elevation: 221 m (725 ft)
- Lowest elevation: 158 m (518 ft)
- Population (2023): 582
  - Density: 41.9/km^{2} (109/sq mi)
- Time zone: UTC+01:00 (CET)
  - Summer (DST): UTC+02:00 (CEST)
- INSEE/Postal code: 61454 /61170
- ^{1} French Land Register data, which excludes lakes, ponds, glaciers > 1 km^{2} (0.386 sq mi or 247 acres) and river estuaries.

Sainte-Scolasse-sur-Sarthe (French pronunciation: [sɛ̃t skɔlas syʁ saʁt], literally Sainte-Scolasse on Sarthe) is a commune in the Orne department in north-western France.

== Geography ==
The commune along with another 32 communes is part of a 3,503 hectare, Natura 2000 conservation area, called the Haute vallée de la Sarthe.

The Sarthe river flows through the commune. Another river, one of the Sarthe's tributaries, La Fresbee also flows through the commune. In addition a stream the Ruisseau de la chitière traverses the commune.

== See also ==
- Communes of the Orne department
