= Buré =

- Commune
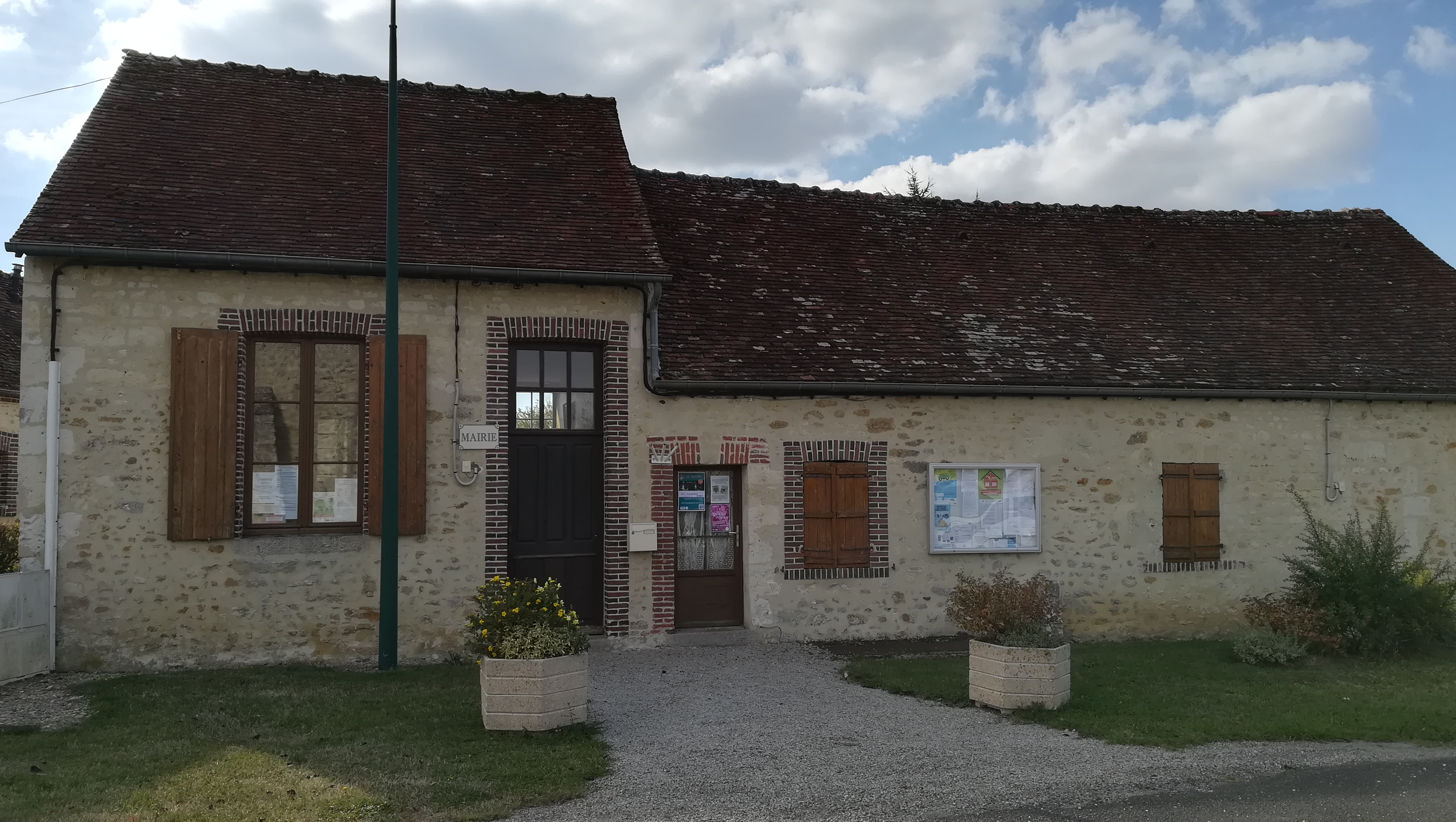
- Location of Buré
- Location within France Location within Normandy
- Coordinates: 48°31′06″N 0°24′23″E
- Country: France
- Region: Normandy
- Department: Orne
- Arrondissement: Alençon
- Canton: Écouves
- Intercommunality: Vallée de la Haute Sarthe

Government
  - Mayor (2020–2026): Monique Flerchinger
- Area^{1}: 5.65 km^{2} (2.18 sq mi)
- Elevation: 165 m (541 ft)
- Highest elevation: 211 m (692 ft)
- Lowest elevation: 148 m (486 ft)
- Population (2023): 98
  - Density: 17/km^{2} (45/sq mi)
- Time zone: UTC+01:00 (CET)
  - Summer (DST): UTC+02:00 (CEST)
- INSEE/Postal code: 61066 /61170
- ^{1} French Land Register data, which excludes lakes, ponds, glaciers > 1 km^{2} (0.386 sq mi or 247 acres) and river estuaries.

Buré (French pronunciation: [byre]) is a commune in the Orne department in northwestern France.

== Geography ==
The commune is made up of the following collection of villages and hamlets, Moulin de Buré and Buré.

The commune along with another 32 communes is part of a 3,503 hectare, Natura 2000 conservation area, called the Haute vallée de la Sarthe.

The Sarthe river flows through the commune. In addition the river l'Erine traverses through the commune.

== Population ==
Historical population
Year	Pop.	±% p.a.
1968	123	—
1975	88	−4.67%
1982	72	−2.83%
1990	94	+3.39%
1999	101	+0.80%
2007	114	+1.52%
2012	122	+1.37%
2017	111	−1.87%
2023	98	−2.05%
Source: INSEE

== Notable buildings and places ==
=== National heritage sites ===
- Buré Mill is a 19th-century Mill that was declared as a Monument historique in 1995.

== Notable people ==
- Henri Fantin-Latour (1836 – 1904) was a French painter and lithographer who died here.
- Victoria Dubourg (1840 – 30 September 1926) was a French still life painter who died here.

== See also ==
- Communes of the Orne department
