= Tellières-le-Plessis =

- Commune
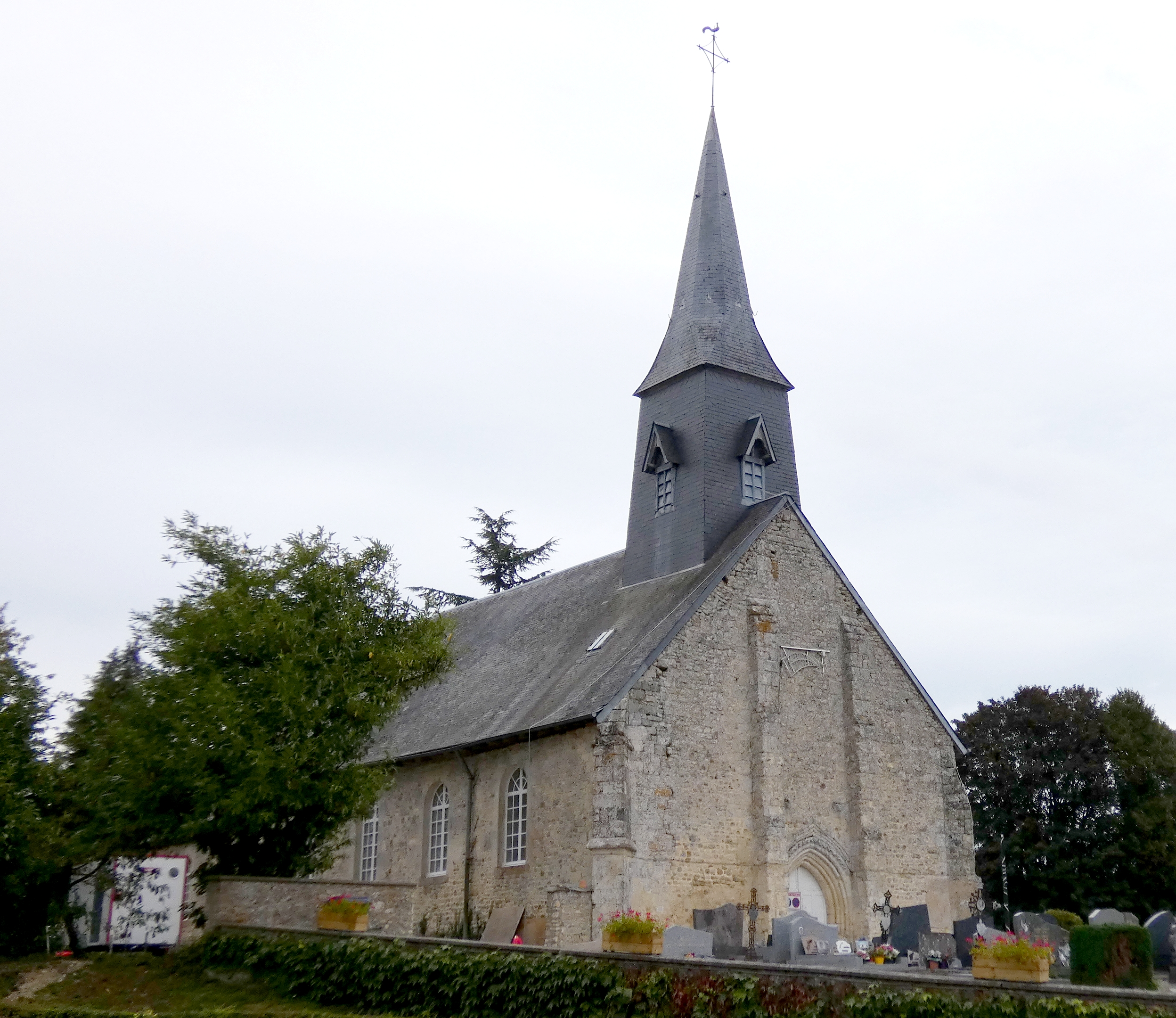
- The church in Tellières-le-Plessis
- Location of Tellières-le-Plessis
- Location within France Location within Normandy
- Coordinates: 48°37′38″N 0°23′33″E
- Country: France
- Region: Normandy
- Department: Orne
- Arrondissement: Alençon
- Canton: Écouves
- Intercommunality: Vallée de la Haute Sarthe

Government
  - Mayor (2020–2026): Emmanuel Gouello
- Area^{1}: 5.41 km^{2} (2.09 sq mi)
- Elevation: 250 m (820 ft)
- Highest elevation: 244 m (801 ft)
- Lowest elevation: 169 m (554 ft)
- Population (2023): 66
  - Density: 12/km^{2} (32/sq mi)
- Demonym: Telliériens
- Time zone: UTC+01:00 (CET)
  - Summer (DST): UTC+02:00 (CEST)
- INSEE/Postal code: 61481 /61390
- ^{1} French Land Register data, which excludes lakes, ponds, glaciers > 1 km^{2} (0.386 sq mi or 247 acres) and river estuaries.

Tellières-le-Plessis (French pronunciation: [tɛljɛʁ lə plɛsi]) is a commune in the Orne department in north-western France.

== Geography ==
The Le Guerne river flows through the commune. In addition another watercourse the Ruisseau de loisellière passes through the commune.

== See also ==
- Communes of the Orne department
