= Haute vallée de la Sarthe =

Haute Vallée de la Sarthe translated as the Upper Sarthe Valley is a Natura 2000 conservation area that is 3,503 hectares in size.

== Geography ==
The area is an Alluvial plain in a valley that commonly floods in winter. It is mainly consisted of sparse natural meadows crossed by a very developed hydrographic network (numerous tributaries, ditches).

It is spread across 29 different communes within the Orne department and 4 within the Sarthe department;

1. Alençon
2. Barville
3. Bazoches-sur-Hoëne
4. Bures
5. Buré
6. Cerisé
7. Champeaux-sur-Sarthe
8. Chenay
9. Coulonges-sur-Sarthe
10. Hauterive
11. Héloup
12. Laleu
13. Mahéru
14. Mesnières-en-Bray
15. Mieuxcé
16. Moulins-le-Carbonnel
17. Moulins-la-Marche
18. Le Ménil-Broût
19. Le Mêle-sur-Sarthe
20. Le Plantis
21. Saint-Agnan-sur-Sarthe
22. Saint-Aubin-de-Courteraie
23. Saint-Céneri-le-Gérei
24. Saint-Germain-du-Corbéis
25. Saint-Julien-sur-Sarthe
26. Saint-Léger-sur-Sarthe
27. Saint-Martin-des-Pézerits
28. Saint Paterne - Le Chevain
29. Sainte-Scolasse-sur-Sarthe
30. Semallé
31. Valframbert
32. Villeneuve-en-Perseigne
33. Les Ventes-de-Bourse

Some parts of this Natura 2000 site are within the Normandie-Maine Regional Natural Park.

== Conservation ==
The conservation area has nineteen species listed in Annex 2 of the Habitats Directive;

1. Northern crested newt
2. European bullhead
3. Cottus perifretum
4. Brook lamprey
5. European bitterling
6. Great capricorn beetle
7. Marsh fritillary
8. Jersey tiger
9. European stag beetle
10. Hermit beetle
11. Narrow-mouthed whorl snail
12. Desmoulin's whorl snail
13. Western barbastelle
14. Eurasian otter
15. Bechstein's bat
16. Geoffroy's bat
17. Greater mouse-eared bat
18. Greater horseshoe bat
19. Lesser horseshoe bat

In addition the Natura 2000 site has 7 habitats protected under the Habitats Directive.
