= Gâprée =

- Commune
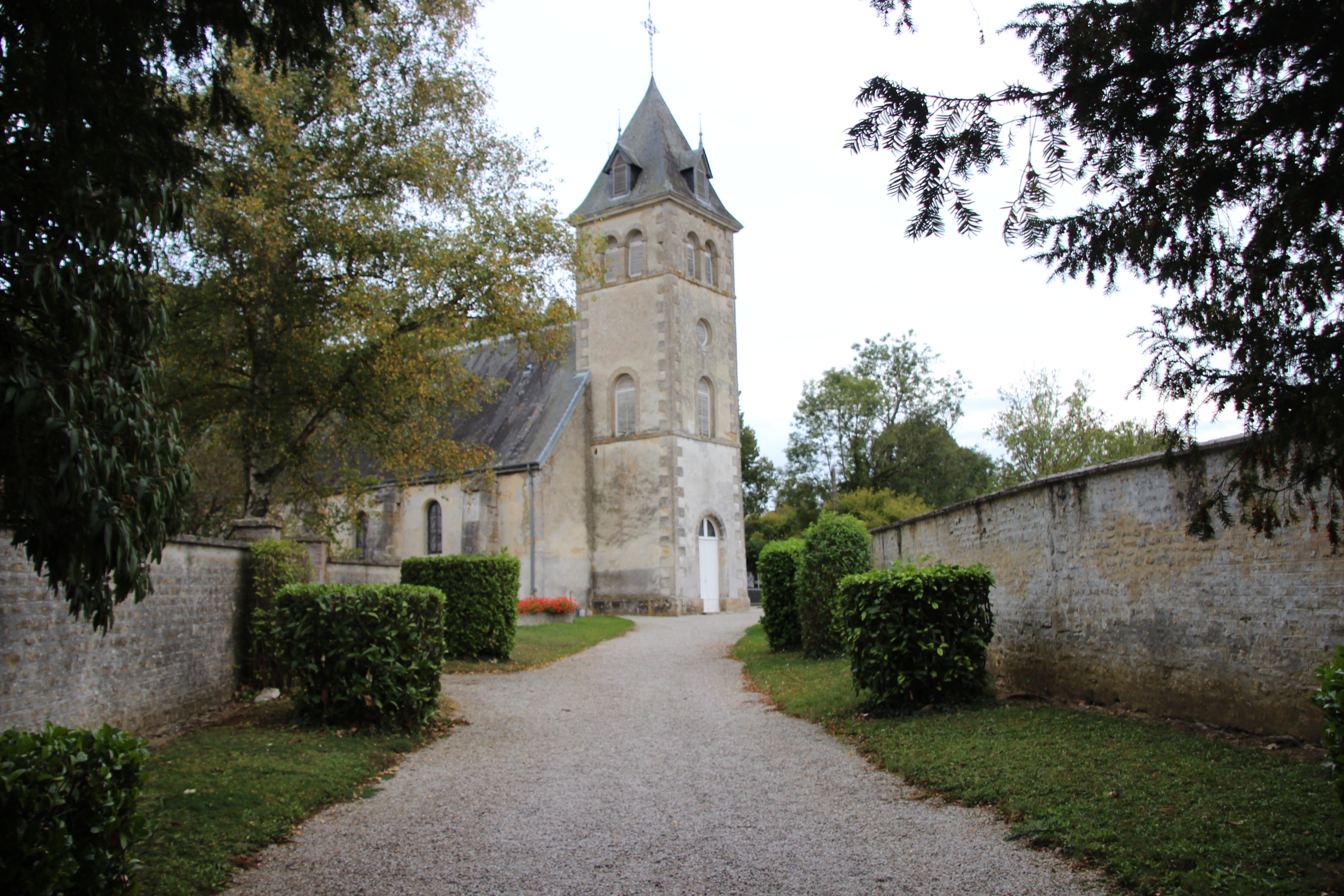
- Location of Gâprée
- Location within France Location within Normandy
- Coordinates: 48°37′24″N 0°17′32″E
- Country: France
- Region: Normandy
- Department: Orne
- Arrondissement: Alençon
- Canton: Écouves
- Intercommunality: Vallée de la Haute Sarthe

Government
  - Mayor (2020–2026): François Rattier
- Area^{1}: 9.84 km^{2} (3.80 sq mi)
- Elevation: 240 m (790 ft)
- Highest elevation: 238 m (781 ft)
- Lowest elevation: 184 m (604 ft)
- Population (2023): 142
  - Density: 14.4/km^{2} (37.4/sq mi)
- Time zone: UTC+01:00 (CET)
  - Summer (DST): UTC+02:00 (CEST)
- INSEE/Postal code: 61183 /61390
- ^{1} French Land Register data, which excludes lakes, ponds, glaciers > 1 km^{2} (0.386 sq mi or 247 acres) and river estuaries.

Gâprée (French pronunciation: [ɡapʁe]) is a commune in the Orne department in north-western France.

== Geography ==
Gâprée is made up of the following collection of villages and hamlets, La Melletière, Le Bois Lambert, La Lipomerie, Le Joualin, Gâprée, Louvoy, Vitrai, Sous le Bois, La Brêchetière and Le Ménil.

Gâprée along with another 65 communes is part of a 20,593 hectare, Natura 2000 conservation area, called the Haute vallée de l'Orne et affluents.

A river La Senelle, plus two streams the Monts Damain and Ruisseau des Veaux Massees flow within the commune.

== See also ==
- Communes of the Orne department
