= Saint-Julien-sur-Sarthe =

- Commune
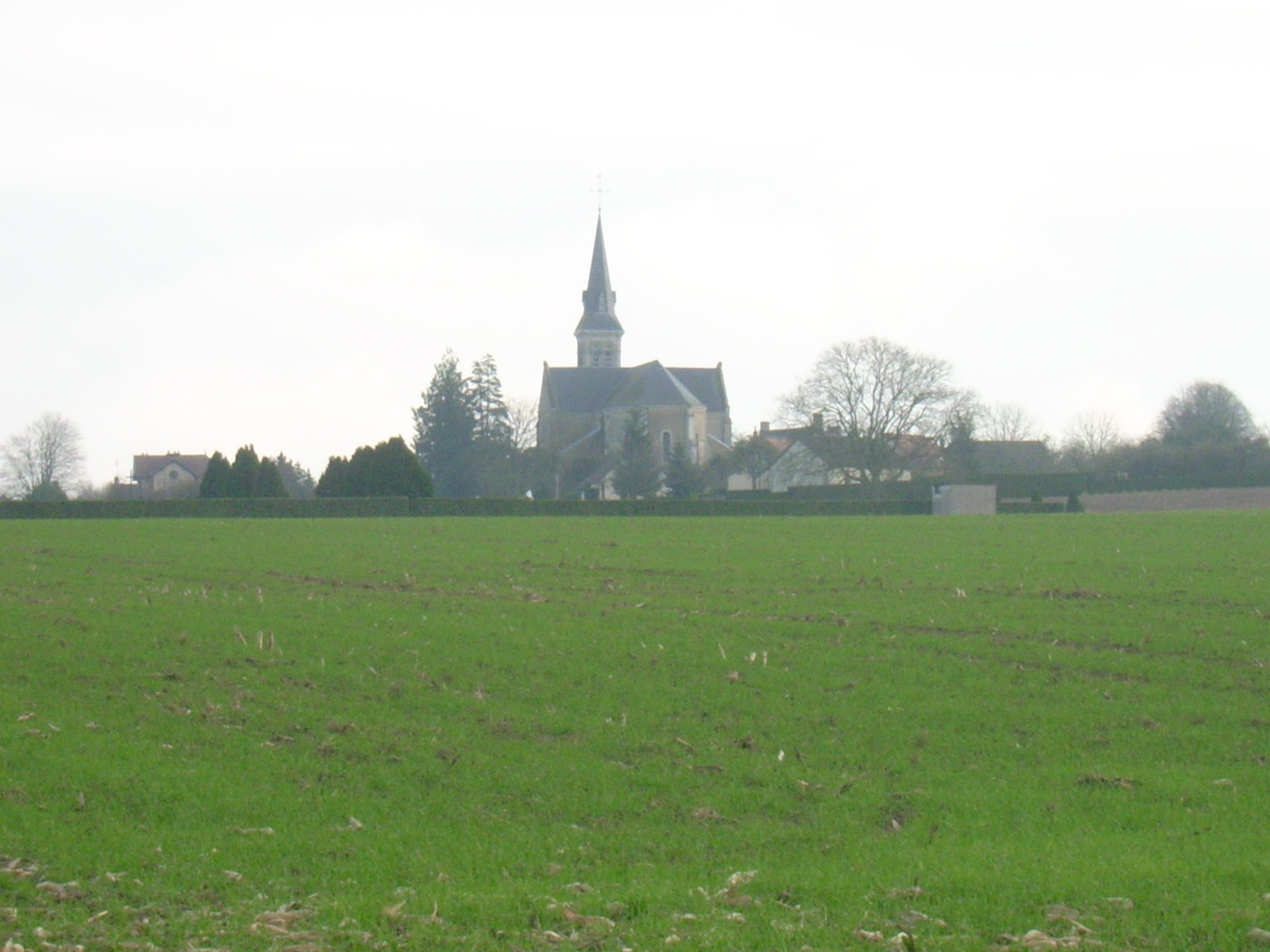
- The church and surroundings in Saint-Julien-sur-Sarthe
- Location of Saint-Julien-sur-Sarthe
- Location within France Location within Normandy
- Coordinates: 48°29′30″N 0°21′31″E
- Country: France
- Region: Normandy
- Department: Orne
- Arrondissement: Alençon
- Canton: Écouves

Government
  - Mayor (2020–2026): Vianney Girard
- Area^{1}: 16.39 km^{2} (6.33 sq mi)
- Elevation: 180 m (590 ft)
- Highest elevation: 197 m (646 ft)
- Lowest elevation: 141 m (463 ft)
- Population (2023): 672
  - Density: 41.0/km^{2} (106/sq mi)
- Time zone: UTC+01:00 (CET)
  - Summer (DST): UTC+02:00 (CEST)
- INSEE/Postal code: 61412 /61170
- ^{1} French Land Register data, which excludes lakes, ponds, glaciers > 1 km^{2} (0.386 sq mi or 247 acres) and river estuaries.

Saint-Julien-sur-Sarthe (French pronunciation: [sɛ̃ ʒyljɛ̃ syʁ saʁt], literally Saint-Julien on Sarthe) is a commune in the Orne department in north-western France.

== Geography ==
The commune along with another 32 communes is part of a 3,503 hectare, Natura 2000 conservation area, called the Haute vallée de la Sarthe.

The Sarthe river flows through the commune.

The commune is in the Normandie-Maine Regional Natural Park.

== Points of interest ==
- Departmental fire brigade museum was opened in the commune in 2023 after moving from Bagnoles-de-l'Orne, which was closed in 2014. The museum aims to preserve and present the heritage of Ornais, French and foreign firefighters.

== See also ==
- Communes of the Orne department
- Parc naturel régional Normandie-Maine
