= Le Ménil-Broût =

- Commune
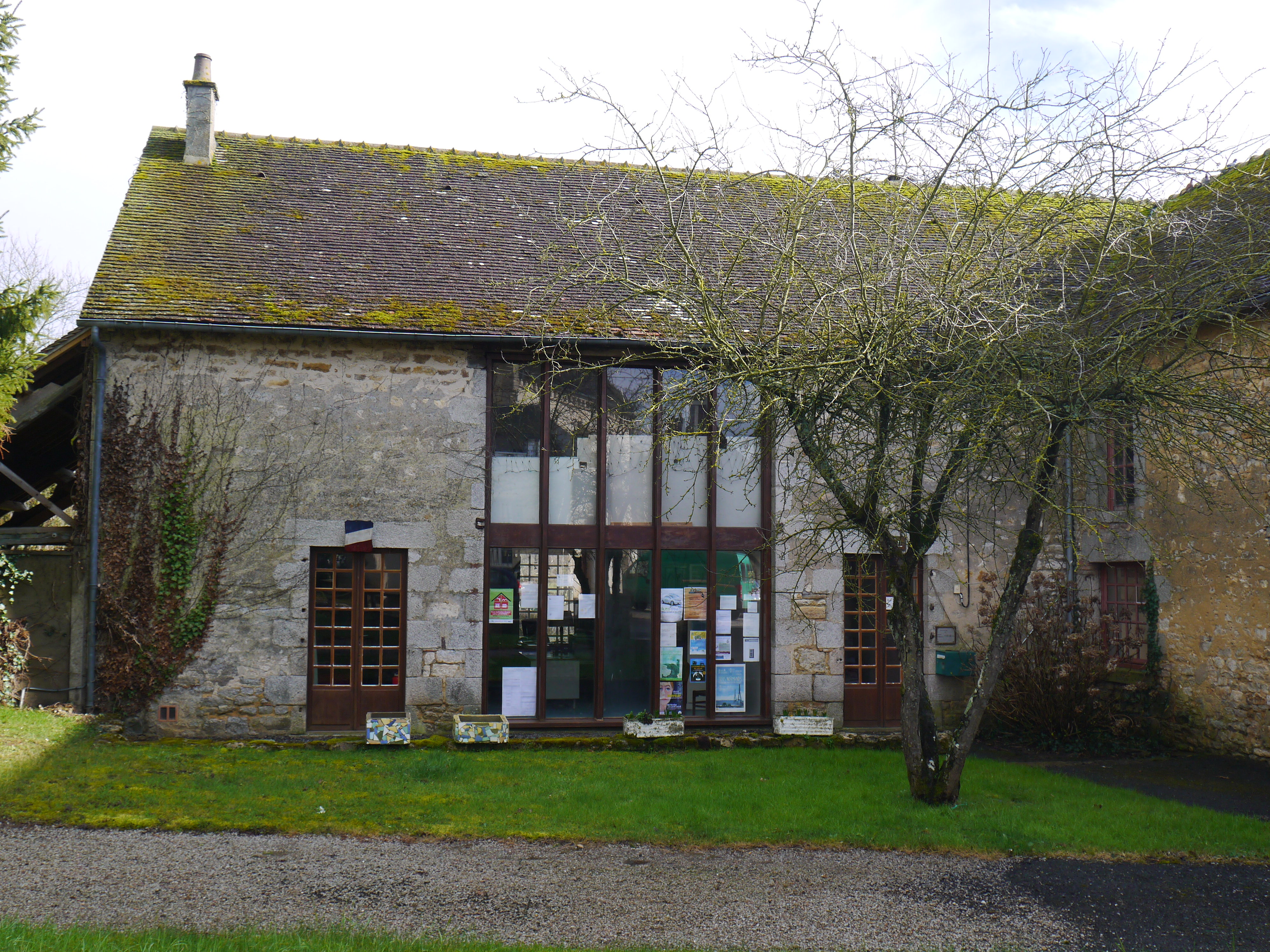
- The town hall in Le Ménil-Broût
- Location of Le Ménil-Broût
- Location within France Location within Normandy
- Coordinates: 48°29′01″N 0°13′53″E
- Country: France
- Region: Normandy
- Department: Orne
- Arrondissement: Alençon
- Canton: Écouves
- Intercommunality: Vallée de la Haute Sarthe

Government
  - Mayor (2020–2026): Didier Bourban
- Area^{1}: 3.44 km^{2} (1.33 sq mi)
- Elevation: 145 m (476 ft)
- Highest elevation: 157 m (515 ft)
- Lowest elevation: 134 m (440 ft)
- Population (2023): 177
  - Density: 51.5/km^{2} (133/sq mi)
- Time zone: UTC+01:00 (CET)
  - Summer (DST): UTC+02:00 (CEST)
- INSEE/Postal code: 61261 /61250
- ^{1} French Land Register data, which excludes lakes, ponds, glaciers > 1 km^{2} (0.386 sq mi or 247 acres) and river estuaries.

Le Ménil-Broût (French pronunciation: [lə menil bʁu]) is a commune in the Orne department in north-western France. It is around 10 km north-east of Alençon, 50 km north of Le Mans, and 150 km west of Paris.

== Geography ==
Le Ménil-Broût is made up of the following collection of villages and hamlets, Le Ménil-Broût and La Butte.

The commune along with another 32 communes is part of a 3,503 hectare, Natura 2000 conservation area, called the Haute vallée de la Sarthe.

The commune is in the Normandie-Maine Regional Natural Park.

The Sarthe river flows through the commune. Another river, La Vézone, also flows through the commune.

== See also ==
- Communes of the Orne department
- Parc naturel régional Normandie-Maine
