= Hauterive, Orne =

Hauterive
- Commune
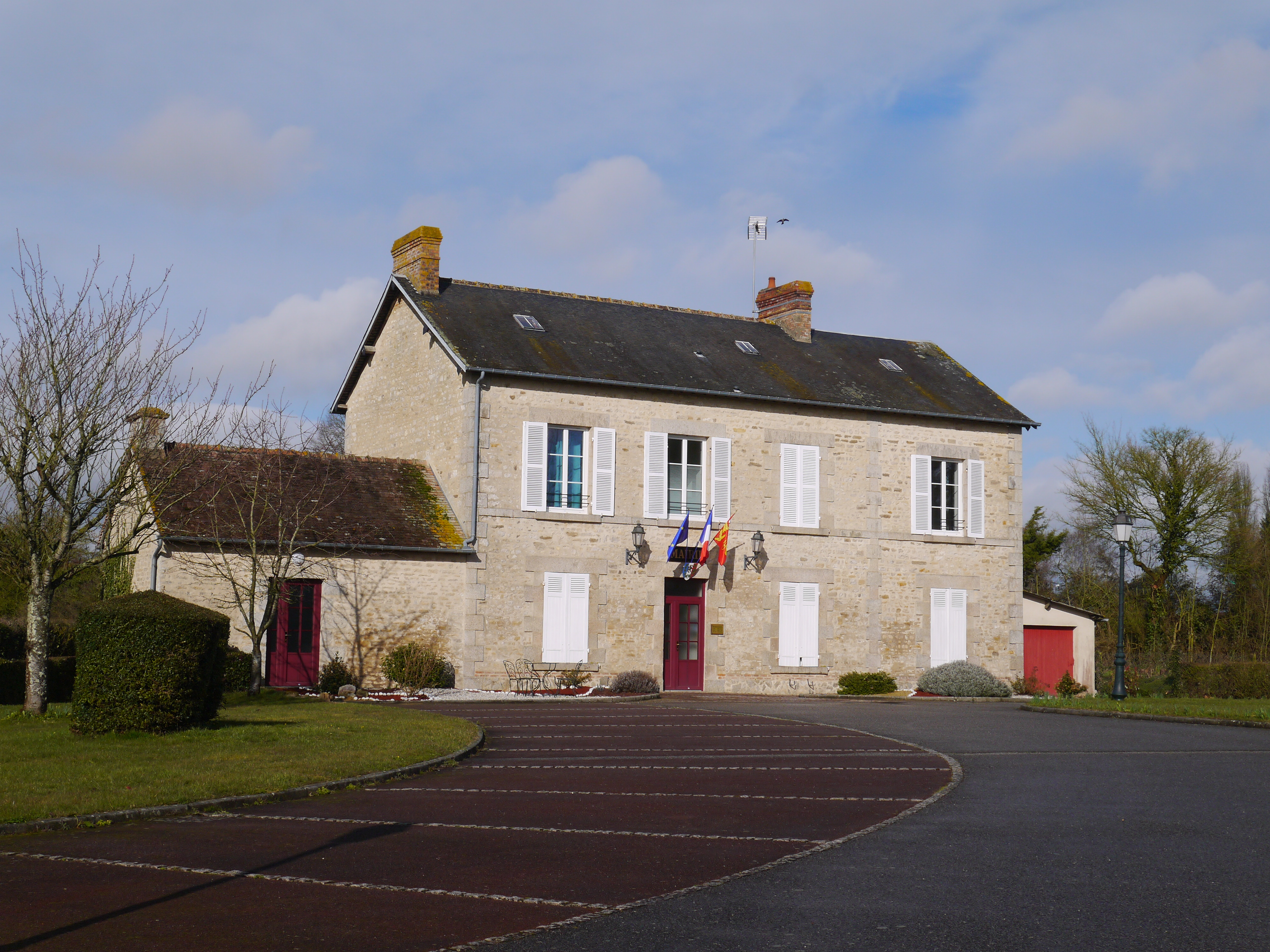
- The town hall in Hauterive

- Coat of arms
- Location of Hauterive
- Location within France Location within Normandy
- Coordinates: 48°28′42″N 0°12′02″E
- Country: France
- Region: Normandy
- Department: Orne
- Arrondissement: Alençon
- Canton: Écouves
- Intercommunality: Vallée de la Haute Sarthe

Government
  - Mayor (2020–2026): Pierre Chatellier
- Area^{1}: 6.98 km^{2} (2.69 sq mi)
- Elevation: 145 m (476 ft)
- Highest elevation: 160 m (520 ft)
- Lowest elevation: 132 m (433 ft)
- Population (2023): 457
  - Density: 65.5/km^{2} (170/sq mi)
- Time zone: UTC+01:00 (CET)
  - Summer (DST): UTC+02:00 (CEST)
- INSEE/Postal code: 61202 /61250
- ^{1} French Land Register data, which excludes lakes, ponds, glaciers > 1 km^{2} (0.386 sq mi or 247 acres) and river estuaries.

Hauterive (French pronunciation: [otʁiv]) is a commune in the Orne department in north-western France.

== Geography ==
The commune is made up of the following collection of villages and hamlets, L'Être aux Brisards, La Roberie, L'Être aux Gérards, Hauterive and Betz.

The commune is in the Normandie-Maine Regional Natural Park.

The commune along with another 32 communes is part of a 3,503 hectare, Natura 2000 conservation area, called the Haute vallée de la Sarthe.

Two rivers, the Sarthe and la Vézone flows through the commune. In addition another three watercourses three rivers perambulate through the commune, le Betz, le Péroncel and la Forêt.

== Points of Interest ==
- Château des Loges is a 17th-century chateau that was listed as a Monument historique in 1995.

== See also ==
- Communes of the Orne department
- Parc naturel régional Normandie-Maine
