= Saint-Agnan-sur-Sarthe =

- Commune
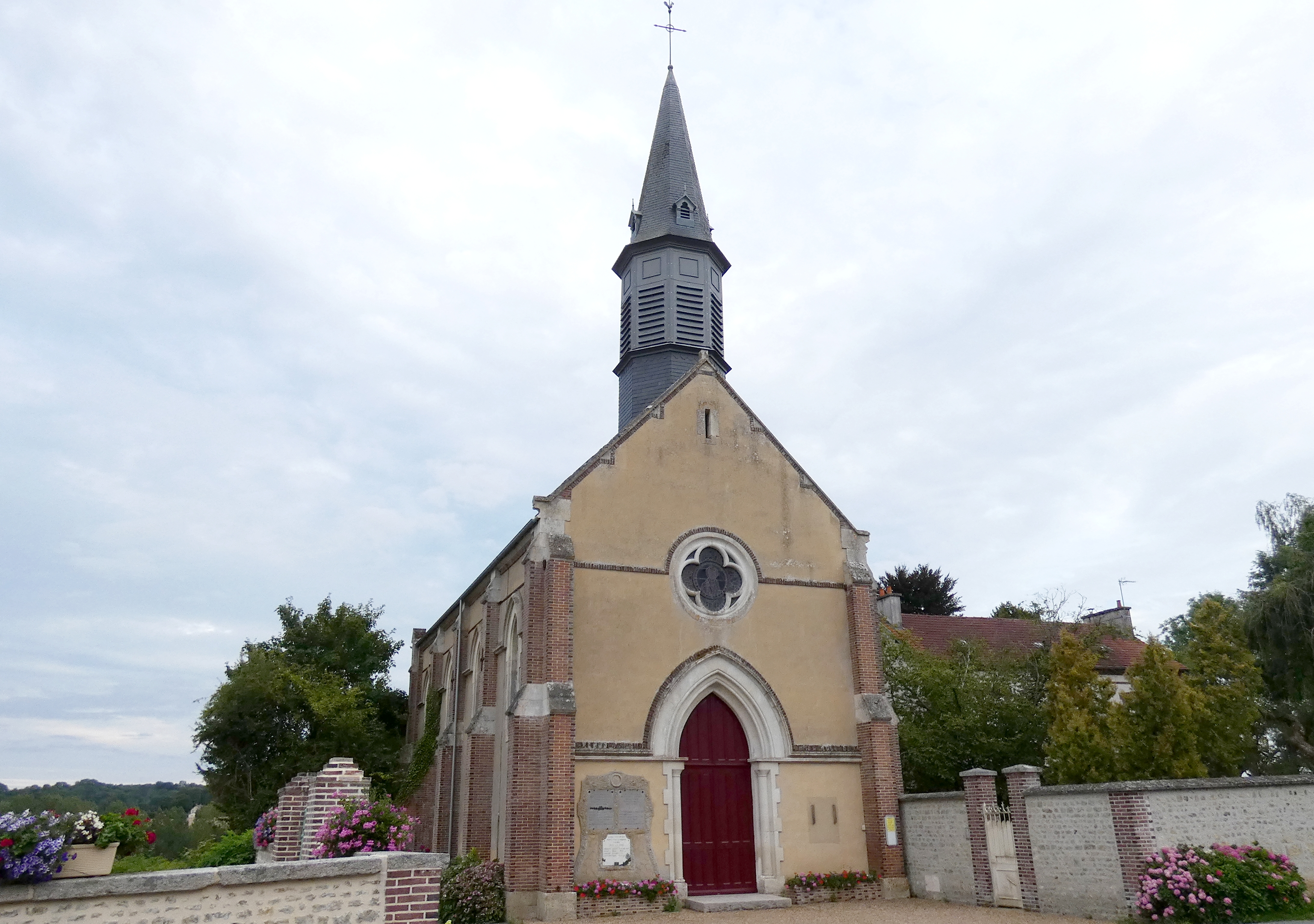
- Location of Saint-Agnan-sur-Sarthe
- Location within France Location within Normandy
- Coordinates: 48°36′39″N 0°25′39″E
- Country: France
- Region: Normandy
- Department: Orne
- Arrondissement: Alençon
- Canton: Écouves

Government
  - Mayor (2020–2026): Martial Drouet
- Area^{1}: 6.24 km^{2} (2.41 sq mi)
- Elevation: 185 m (607 ft)
- Highest elevation: 238 m (781 ft)
- Lowest elevation: 165 m (541 ft)
- Population (2023): 87
  - Density: 14/km^{2} (36/sq mi)
- Time zone: UTC+01:00 (CET)
  - Summer (DST): UTC+02:00 (CEST)
- INSEE/Postal code: 61360 /61170
- ^{1} French Land Register data, which excludes lakes, ponds, glaciers > 1 km^{2} (0.386 sq mi or 247 acres) and river estuaries.

Saint-Agnan-sur-Sarthe (French pronunciation: [sɛ̃ t‿aɲɑ̃ syʁ saʁt], literally Saint-Agnan on Sarthe) is a commune in the Orne department in north-western France.

== Geography ==
The commune is made up of the following collection of villages and hamlets, Les Vallées, La Rue du Bois, Le Val Rusé, Le Val Martin and Saint-Agnan-sur-Sarthe.

The commune along with another 32 communes is part of a 3,503 hectare, Natura 2000 conservation area, called the Haute vallée de la Sarthe.

The Sarthe river flows through the commune. In addition two other watercourses flow through the coomune, a river Le Fay and a stream Ruisseau de loisellière.

== See also ==
- Communes of the Orne department
