= Vidai =

- Commune
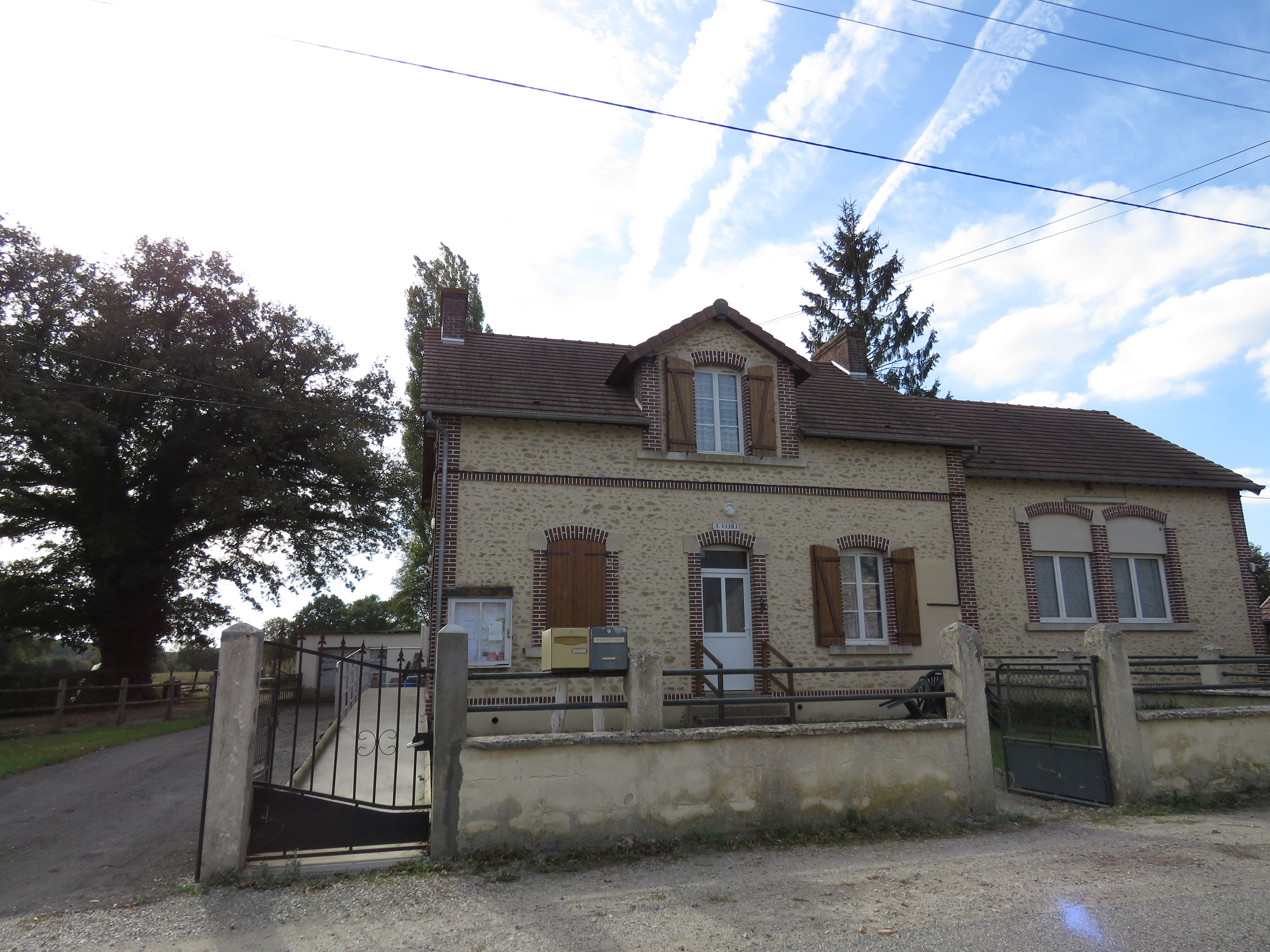
- The town hall in Vidai
- Location of Vidai
- Location within France Location within Normandy
- Coordinates: 48°27′35″N 0°22′48″E
- Country: France
- Region: Normandy
- Department: Orne
- Arrondissement: Alençon
- Canton: Écouves
- Intercommunality: Vallée de la Haute Sarthe

Government
  - Mayor (2020–2026): Christian Bohain
- Area^{1}: 1.55 km^{2} (0.60 sq mi)
- Elevation: 151 m (495 ft)
- Highest elevation: 158 m (518 ft)
- Lowest elevation: 144 m (472 ft)
- Population (2023): 72
  - Density: 46/km^{2} (120/sq mi)
- Time zone: UTC+01:00 (CET)
  - Summer (DST): UTC+02:00 (CEST)
- INSEE/Postal code: 61502 /61360
- ^{1} French Land Register data, which excludes lakes, ponds, glaciers > 1 km^{2} (0.386 sq mi or 247 acres) and river estuaries.

Vidai (French pronunciation: [vidɛ]) is a commune in the Orne department in north-western France.

== See also ==
- Communes of the Orne department
