= Canton of Écouves =

Coordinates: 48.50°N 0.10°E

The canton of Écouves (before March 2020: canton of Radon) is an administrative division of the Orne department, northwestern France. It was created at the French canton reorganisation which came into effect in March 2015. Its seat is in Écouves.

It consists of the following communes:

1. Aunay-les-Bois
2. Barville
3. Brullemail
4. Buré
5. Bures
6. Bursard
7. Le Chalange
8. Coulonges-sur-Sarthe
9. Courtomer
10. Écouves
11. Essay
12. Ferrières-la-Verrerie
13. Gâprée
14. Hauterive
15. Laleu
16. Larré
17. Marchemaisons
18. Le Mêle-sur-Sarthe
19. Le Ménil-Broût
20. Ménil-Erreux
21. Le Ménil-Guyon
22. Montchevrel
23. Neuilly-le-Bisson
24. Le Plantis
25. Saint-Agnan-sur-Sarthe
26. Saint-Aubin-d'Appenai
27. Sainte-Scolasse-sur-Sarthe
28. Saint-Germain-le-Vieux
29. Saint-Julien-sur-Sarthe
30. Saint-Léger-sur-Sarthe
31. Saint-Léonard-des-Parcs
32. Saint-Quentin-de-Blavou
33. Semallé
34. Tellières-le-Plessis
35. Trémont
36. Les Ventes-de-Bourse
37. Vidai
