= Montchevrel =

- Commune
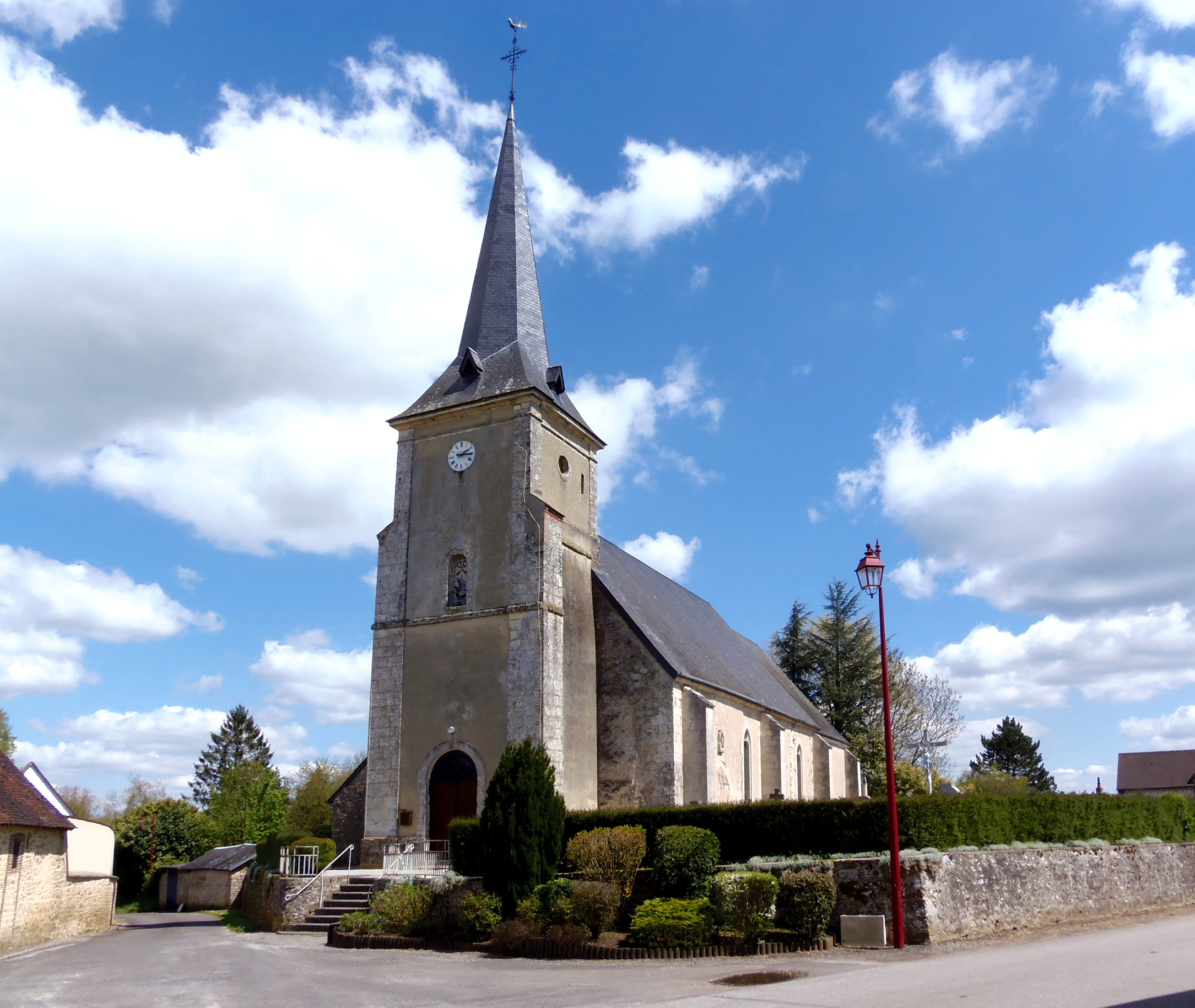
- The church in Montchevrel
- Location of Montchevrel
- Location within France Location within Normandy
- Coordinates: 48°34′26″N 0°20′24″E
- Country: France
- Region: Normandy
- Department: Orne
- Arrondissement: Alençon
- Canton: Écouves
- Intercommunality: Vallée de la Haute Sarthe

Government
  - Mayor (2020–2026): Hélène Provost-Olivier
- Area^{1}: 10.80 km^{2} (4.17 sq mi)
- Elevation: 212 m (696 ft)
- Highest elevation: 221 m (725 ft)
- Lowest elevation: 153 m (502 ft)
- Population (2023): 228
  - Density: 21.1/km^{2} (54.7/sq mi)
- Time zone: UTC+01:00 (CET)
  - Summer (DST): UTC+02:00 (CEST)
- INSEE/Postal code: 61284 /61170
- ^{1} French Land Register data, which excludes lakes, ponds, glaciers > 1 km^{2} (0.386 sq mi or 247 acres) and river estuaries.

Montchevrel (French pronunciation: [mɔ̃ʃəvʁɛl]) is a commune in the Orne department in north-western France.

== Geography ==
Montchevrel is made up of the following collection of villages and hamlets, Les Cinq Routes, Le Boulay, La Contrie, Montchevrel, Les Bois Charbonnaux and La Chitière.

Two rivers, la Tanche and La Fresbee flow through the commune. In addition a stream the Ruisseau de la chitière traverses the commune.

== See also ==
- Communes of the Orne department
