= Le Chalange =

- Commune
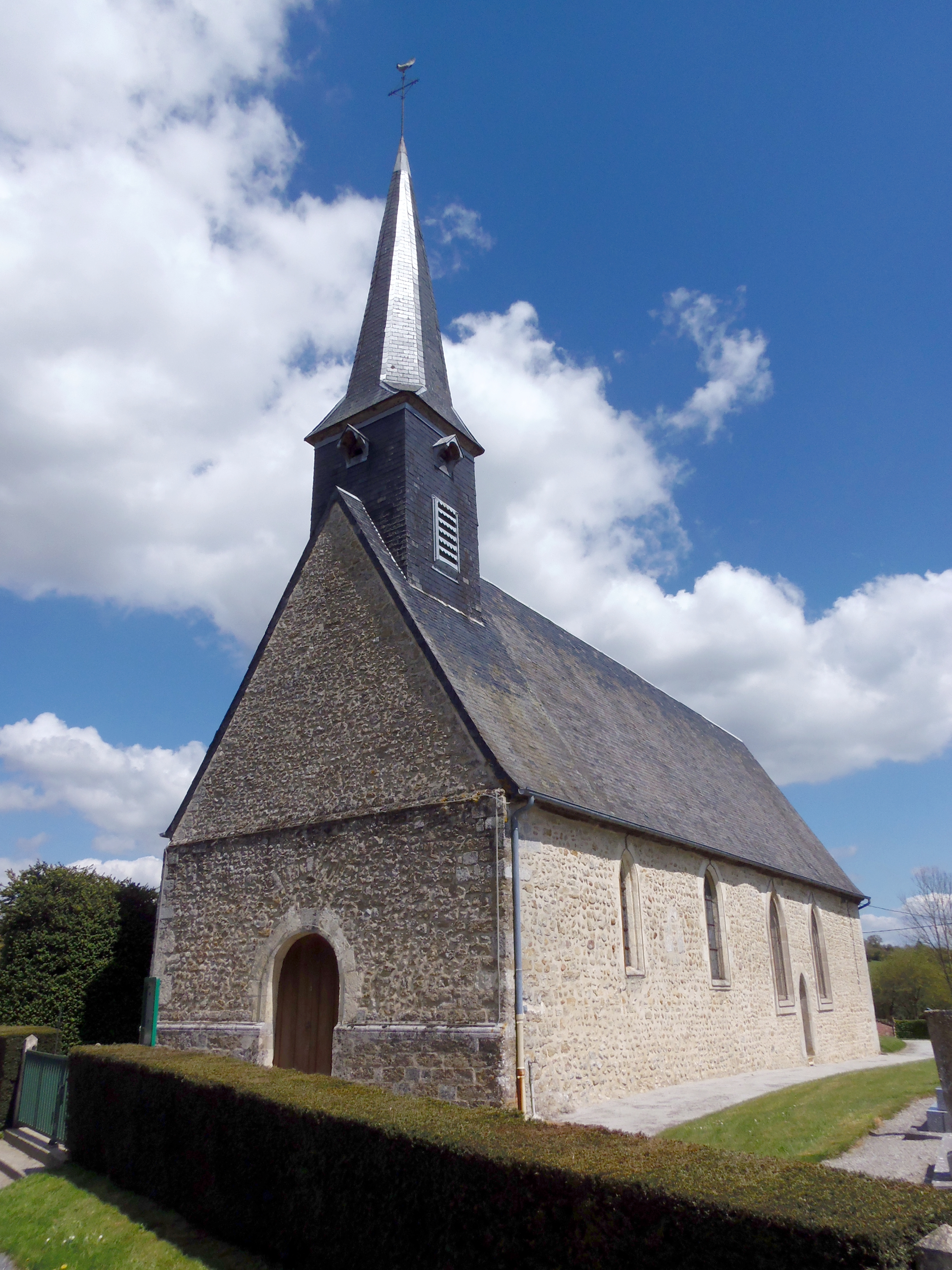
- The church in Le Chalange
- Location of Le Chalange
- Location within France Location within Normandy
- Coordinates: 48°35′39″N 0°18′50″E
- Country: France
- Region: Normandy
- Department: Orne
- Arrondissement: Alençon
- Canton: Écouves
- Intercommunality: Vallée de la Haute Sarthe

Government
  - Mayor (2020–2026): Rémy Rillet
- Area^{1}: 6.27 km^{2} (2.42 sq mi)
- Elevation: 177 m (581 ft)
- Highest elevation: 231 m (758 ft)
- Lowest elevation: 159 m (522 ft)
- Population (2023): 86
  - Density: 14/km^{2} (36/sq mi)
- Time zone: UTC+01:00 (CET)
  - Summer (DST): UTC+02:00 (CEST)
- INSEE/Postal code: 61082 /61390
- ^{1} French Land Register data, which excludes lakes, ponds, glaciers > 1 km^{2} (0.386 sq mi or 247 acres) and river estuaries.

Le Chalange (French pronunciation: [lə ʃalɑ̃ʒ]) is a commune in the Orne department in north-western France.

== Geography ==
The commune is made up of the following collection of villages and hamlets, Les Vergées, La Gastine and Le Chalange.

A river, la Tanche flows through the commune.

== See also ==
- Communes of the Orne department
