= Bursard =

- Commune
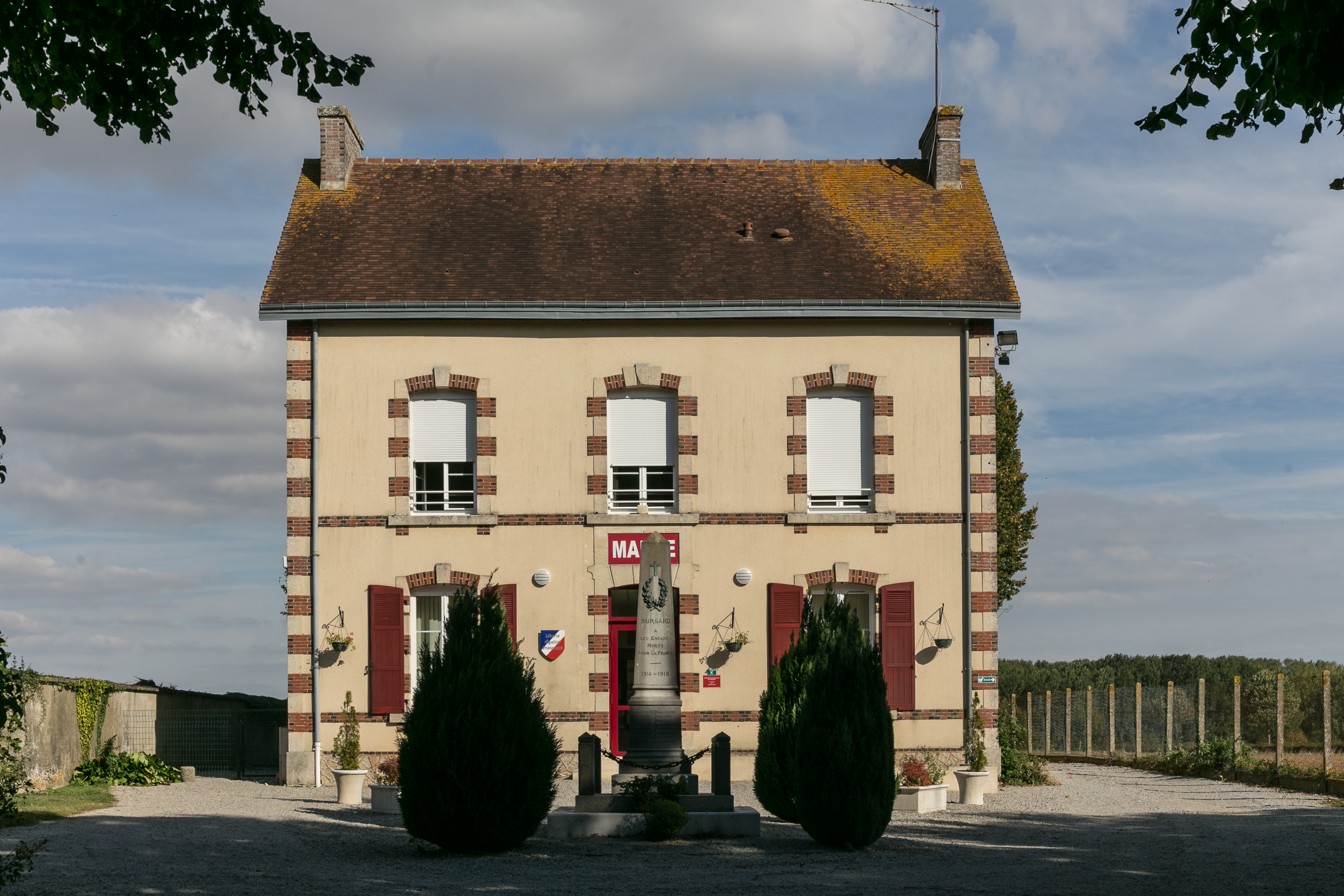
- Location of Bursard
- Location within France Location within Normandy
- Coordinates: 48°32′28″N 0°12′43″E
- Country: France
- Region: Normandy
- Department: Orne
- Arrondissement: Alençon
- Canton: Écouves

Government
  - Mayor (2020–2026): Éric Lecarvennec
- Area^{1}: 10.55 km^{2} (4.07 sq mi)
- Elevation: 160 m (520 ft)
- Highest elevation: 207 m (679 ft)
- Lowest elevation: 144 m (472 ft)
- Population (2023): 199
  - Density: 18.9/km^{2} (48.9/sq mi)
- Time zone: UTC+01:00 (CET)
  - Summer (DST): UTC+02:00 (CEST)
- INSEE/Postal code: 61068 /61500
- ^{1} French Land Register data, which excludes lakes, ponds, glaciers > 1 km^{2} (0.386 sq mi or 247 acres) and river estuaries.

Bursard is a commune in the Orne department in northwestern France.

== Geography ==
The commune is made up of the following collection of villages and hamlets, Les Plaines, La Vergotière, La Goderie, Matignon, Le Buisson and Bursard.

The commune is in the Normandie-Maine Regional Natural Park.

== Population ==
Historical population
Year	Pop.	±% p.a.
1968	211	—
1975	193	−1.27%
1982	172	−1.63%
1990	194	+1.52%
1999	196	+0.11%
2007	195	−0.06%
2012	197	+0.20%
2017	214	+1.67%
2023	199	−1.20%
Source: INSEE

== Notable people ==
- Pierre Louis Roederer (1754 – 1835) a French politician, economist, and historian who died here.

== See also ==
- Communes of the Orne department
- Parc naturel régional Normandie-Maine
