= Saint-Aubin-d'Appenai =

- Commune
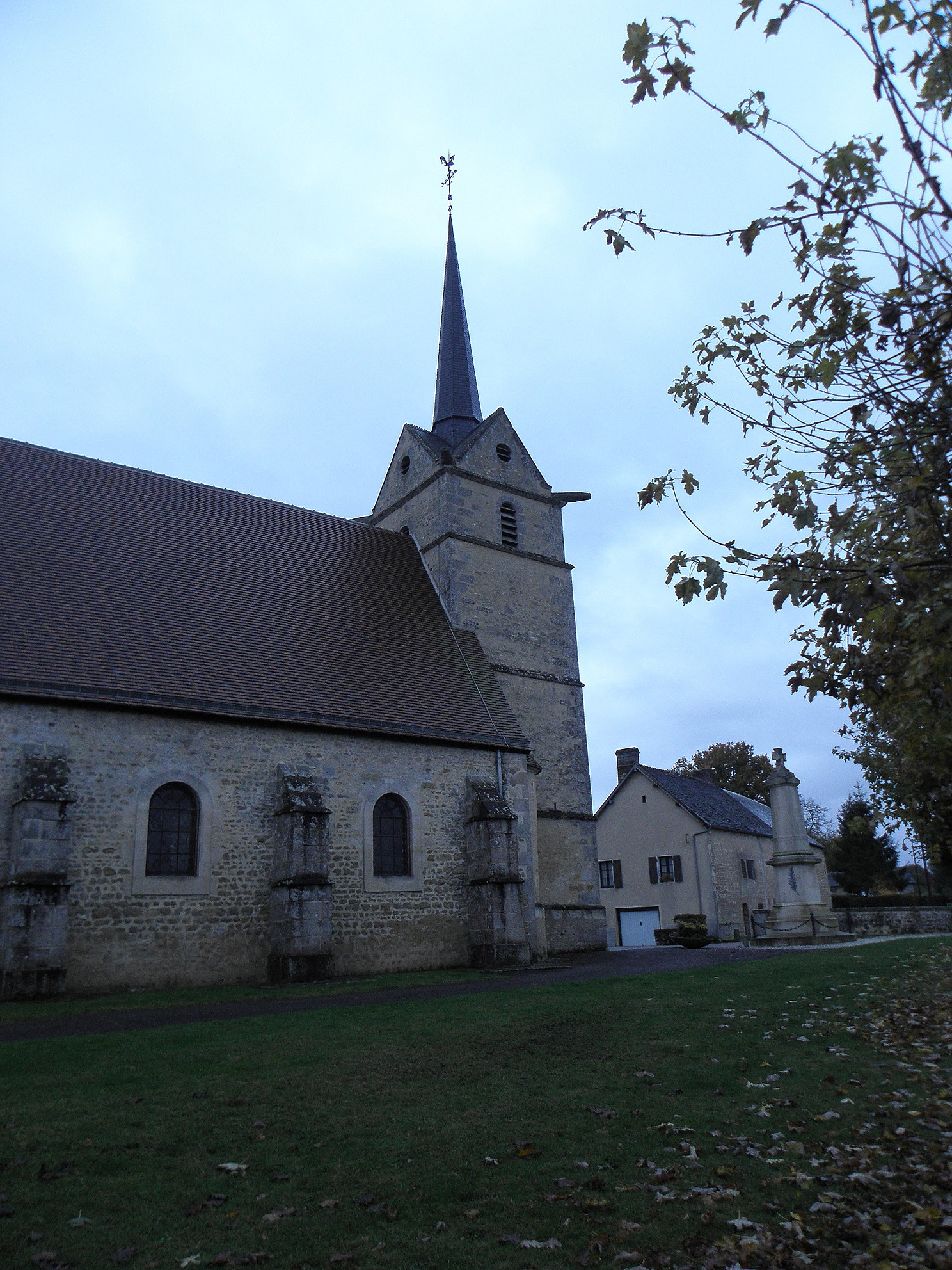
- The church in Saint-Aubin-d'Appenai
- Location of Saint-Aubin-d'Appenai
- Location within France Location within Normandy
- Coordinates: 48°32′11″N 0°20′29″E
- Country: France
- Region: Normandy
- Department: Orne
- Arrondissement: Alençon
- Canton: Écouves

Government
  - Mayor (2020–2026): Christophe Jehannin
- Area^{1}: 11.29 km^{2} (4.36 sq mi)
- Elevation: 192 m (630 ft)
- Highest elevation: 209 m (686 ft)
- Lowest elevation: 144 m (472 ft)
- Population (2023): 441
  - Density: 39.1/km^{2} (101/sq mi)
- Time zone: UTC+01:00 (CET)
  - Summer (DST): UTC+02:00 (CEST)
- INSEE/Postal code: 61365 /61170
- ^{1} French Land Register data, which excludes lakes, ponds, glaciers > 1 km^{2} (0.386 sq mi or 247 acres) and river estuaries.

Saint-Aubin-d'Appenai is a commune in the Orne department in north-western France.

== Geography ==
The commune is made up of the following collection of villages and hamlets, Ouilly, Dimorel, Les Haies, Saint-Aubin-d'Appenai, La Rablais, Les Morvengères and La Libé.

la Tanche flows through the commune, in addition to two of its tributaries Le Villedieu and Le Quincampoix.

The commune is in the Normandie-Maine Regional Natural Park.

== See also ==
- Communes of the Orne department
- Parc naturel régional Normandie-Maine
