= Saint-Germain-le-Vieux =

- Commune
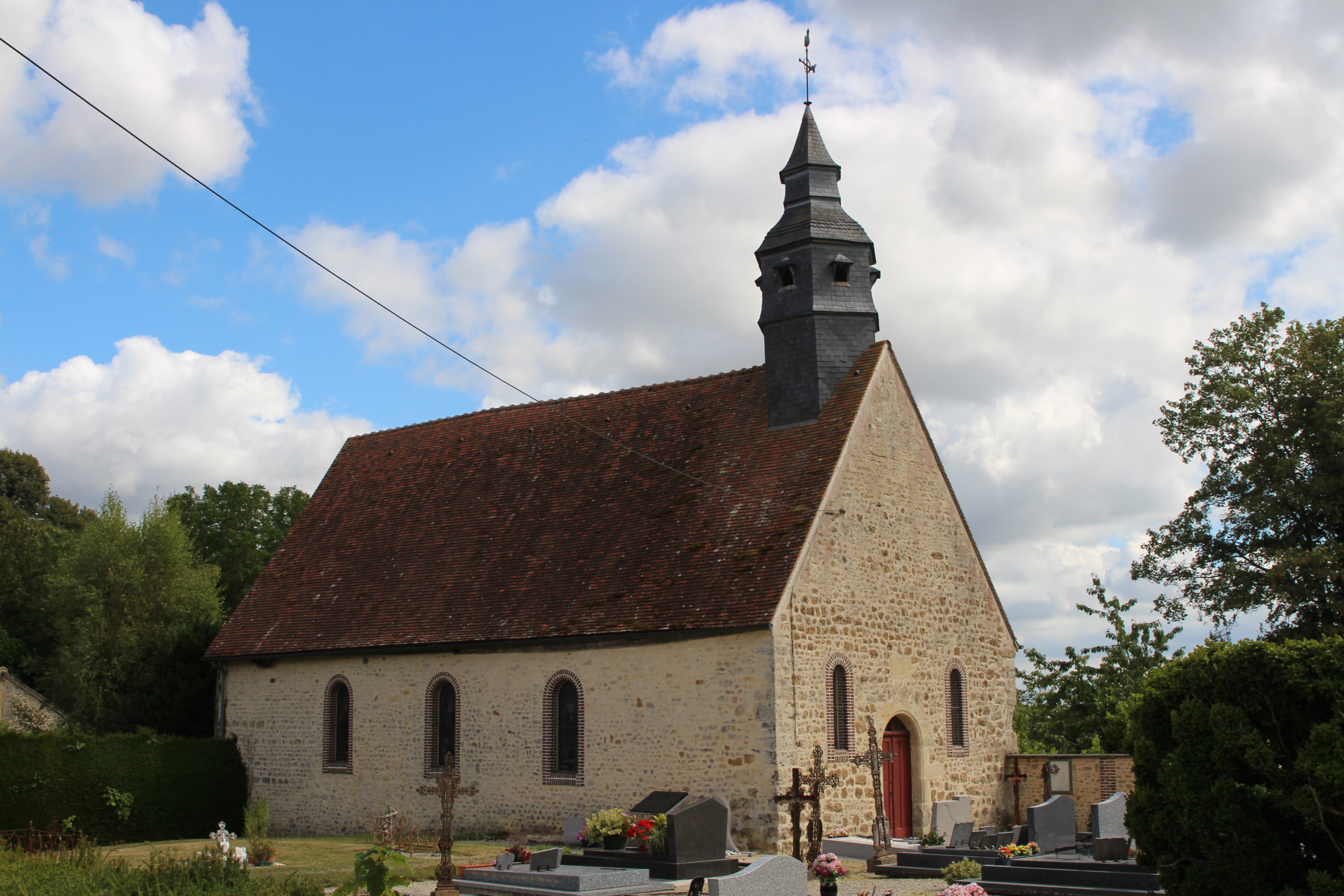
- Location of Saint-Germain-le-Vieux
- Location within France Location within Normandy
- Coordinates: 48°36′44″N 0°18′54″E
- Country: France
- Region: Normandy
- Department: Orne
- Arrondissement: Alençon
- Canton: Écouves

Government
  - Mayor (2020–2026): Sébastien Fossey
- Area^{1}: 3.16 km^{2} (1.22 sq mi)
- Elevation: 211 m (692 ft)
- Highest elevation: 234 m (768 ft)
- Lowest elevation: 186 m (610 ft)
- Population (2023): 62
  - Density: 20/km^{2} (51/sq mi)
- Time zone: UTC+01:00 (CET)
  - Summer (DST): UTC+02:00 (CEST)
- INSEE/Postal code: 61398 /61390
- ^{1} French Land Register data, which excludes lakes, ponds, glaciers > 1 km^{2} (0.386 sq mi or 247 acres) and river estuaries.

Saint-Germain-le-Vieux (French pronunciation: [sɛ̃ ʒɛʁmɛ̃ lə vjø]) is a commune in the Orne department in north-western France.

== Geography ==
Saint-Germain-le-Vieux along with another 65 communes is part of a 20,593 hectare, Natura 2000 conservation area, called the Haute vallée de l'Orne et affluents.

The La Fresbee river plus a stream, Ruisseau des Veaux Massees flow through the commune.

== See also ==
- Communes of the Orne department
