= Aunay-les-Bois =

- Commune
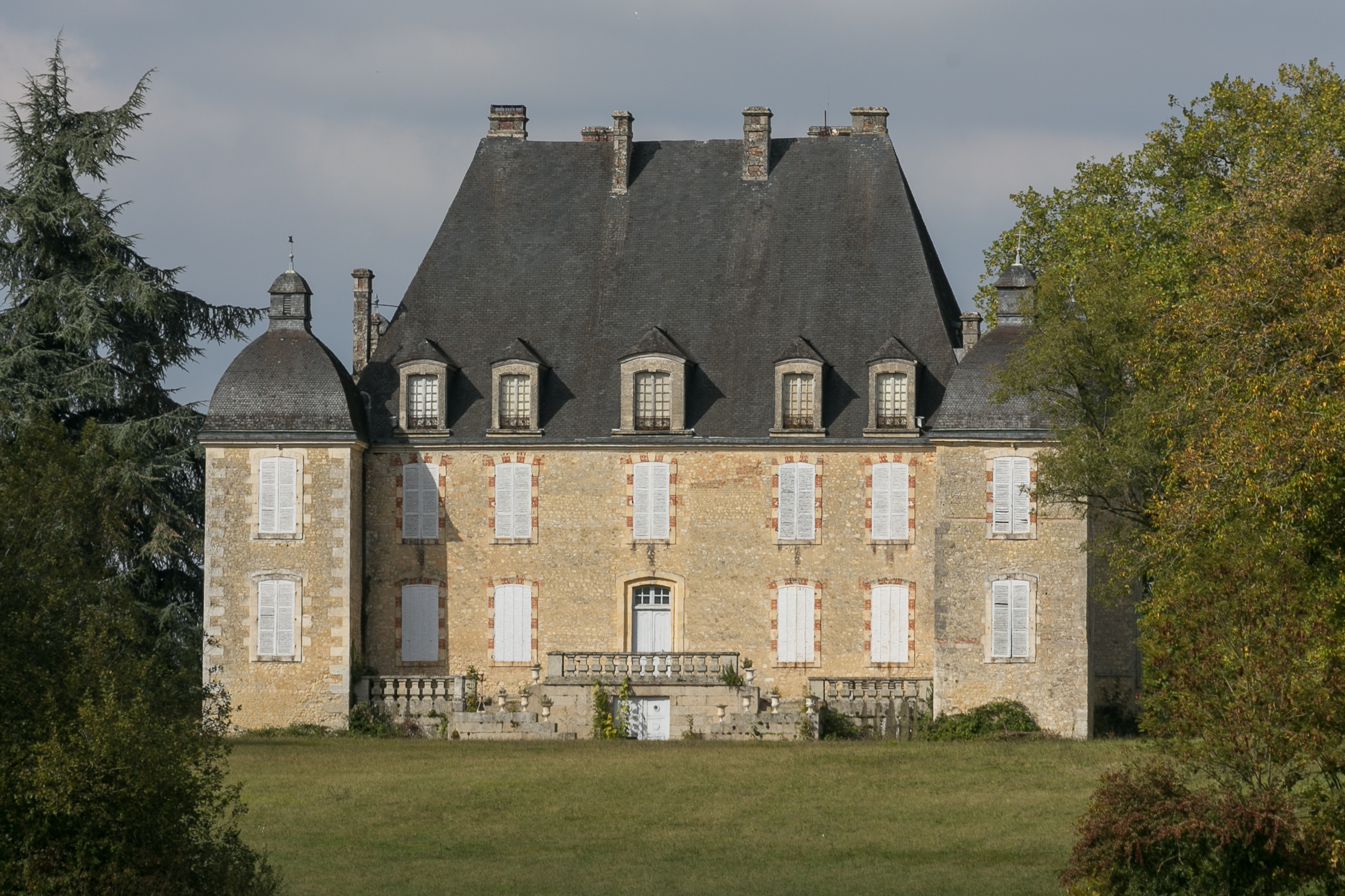
- Location of Aunay-les-Bois
- Location within France Location within Normandy
- Coordinates: 48°32′40″N 0°17′33″E
- Country: France
- Region: Normandy
- Department: Orne
- Arrondissement: Alençon
- Canton: Écouves
- Intercommunality: CC Vallée Haute Sarthe

Government
  - Mayor (2020–2026): Victor Marques
- Area^{1}: 8.53 km^{2} (3.29 sq mi)
- Elevation: 200 m (660 ft)
- Highest elevation: 203 m (666 ft)
- Lowest elevation: 147 m (482 ft)
- Population (2023): 138
  - Density: 16.2/km^{2} (41.9/sq mi)
- Time zone: UTC+01:00 (CET)
  - Summer (DST): UTC+02:00 (CEST)
- INSEE/Postal code: 61013 /61500
- ^{1} French Land Register data, which excludes lakes, ponds, glaciers > 1 km^{2} (0.386 sq mi or 247 acres) and river estuaries.

Aunay-les-Bois (French pronunciation: [onɛ le bwa]) is a commune in the Orne department of Normandy in northwestern France. It is notable for its Karting racetrack, which hosts rounds of the CIK-FIA Karting European Championship.

== Geography ==
The commune is made up of the following collection of villages and hamlets, L'Ogrière, Chambillon, Le Bourg Guérin, La Fortinière, Aunay-les-Bois and Champenou.

A river, la Tanche flows through the commune in addition to one of its tributaries Le Villedieu.

The commune is in the Normandie-Maine Regional Natural Park.

== Population ==
Historical population
Year	Pop.	±% p.a.
1968	133	—
1975	140	+0.74%
1982	141	+0.10%
1990	120	−2.00%
1999	144	+2.05%
2007	155	+0.92%
2012	186	+3.71%
2017	145	−4.86%
2023	138	−0.82%
Source: INSEE

== Notable buildings and places ==
- Circuit International D’Aunay Les Bois is a Karting racetrack that hosts rounds of the CIK-FIA Karting European Championship.

=== National heritage sites ===
- Château d'Aunay-les-Bois is a 17th-century chateau, declared as a Monument historique in 1971.

== See also ==
- Communes of the Orne department
- Parc naturel régional Normandie-Maine
