= Les Ventes-de-Bourse =

- Commune
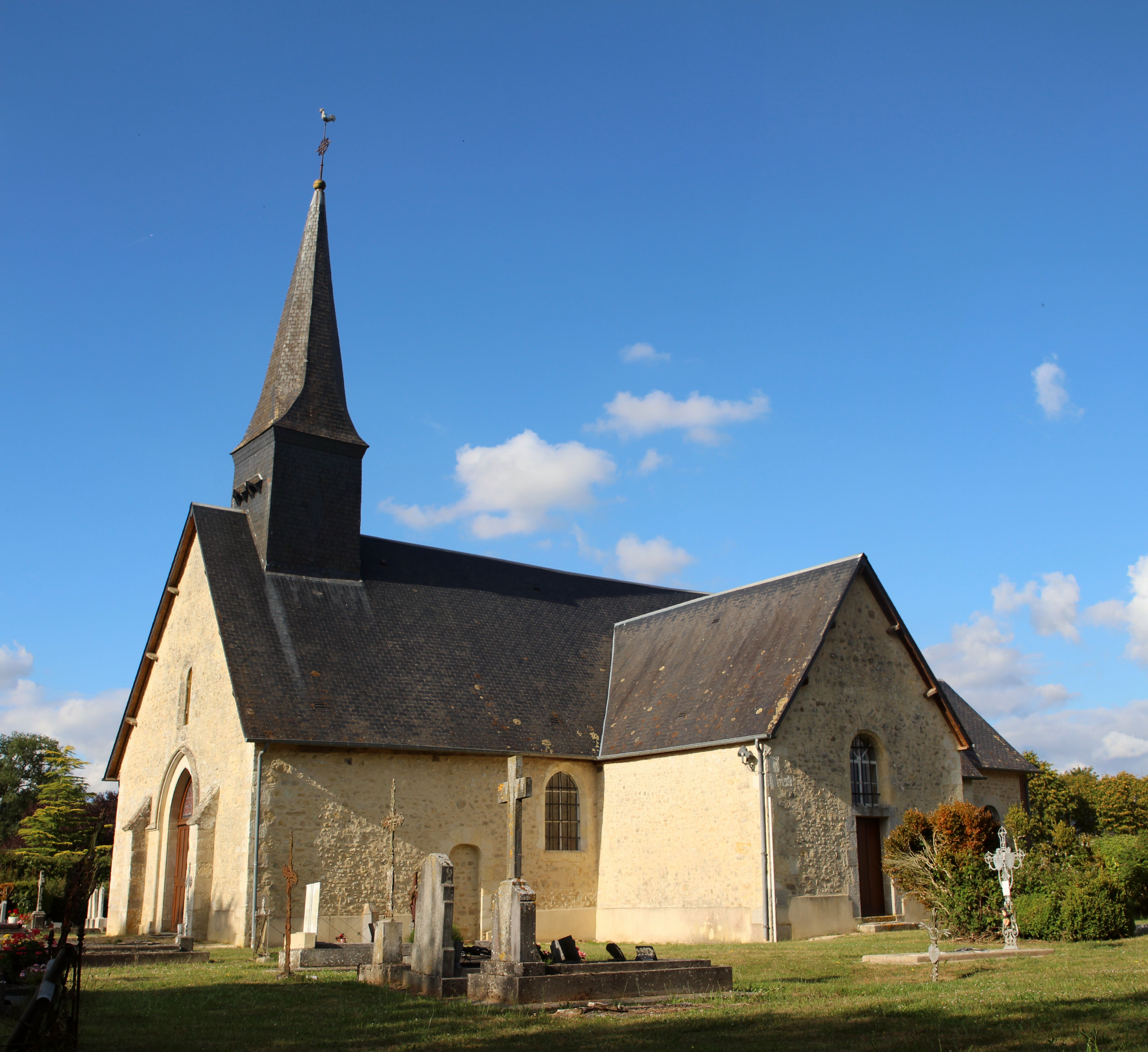
- The church in Les Ventes-de-Bourse
- Location of Les Ventes-de-Bourse
- Location within France Location within Normandy
- Coordinates: 48°30′39″N 0°16′42″E
- Country: France
- Region: Normandy
- Department: Orne
- Arrondissement: Alençon
- Canton: Écouves
- Intercommunality: Vallée de la Haute Sarthe

Government
  - Mayor (2020–2026): Raymond Herbreteau
- Area^{1}: 20.95 km^{2} (8.09 sq mi)
- Elevation: 143 m (469 ft)
- Highest elevation: 195 m (640 ft)
- Lowest elevation: 136 m (446 ft)
- Population (2023): 148
  - Density: 7.06/km^{2} (18.3/sq mi)
- Time zone: UTC+01:00 (CET)
  - Summer (DST): UTC+02:00 (CEST)
- INSEE/Postal code: 61499 /61170
- ^{1} French Land Register data, which excludes lakes, ponds, glaciers > 1 km^{2} (0.386 sq mi or 247 acres) and river estuaries.

Les Ventes-de-Bourse (French pronunciation: [le vɑ̃t də buʁs]) is a commune in the Orne department in north-western France.

== Geography ==
The commune along with another 32 communes is part of a 3,503 hectare, Natura 2000 conservation area, called the Haute vallée de la Sarthe.

The Sarthe river flows through the commune, in addition another two rivers, La Tanche and La Vézone also flow through the commune.

The commune is in the Normandie-Maine Regional Natural Park.

== See also ==
- Communes of the Orne department
- Parc naturel régional Normandie-Maine
