= Le Ménil-Guyon =

- Commune
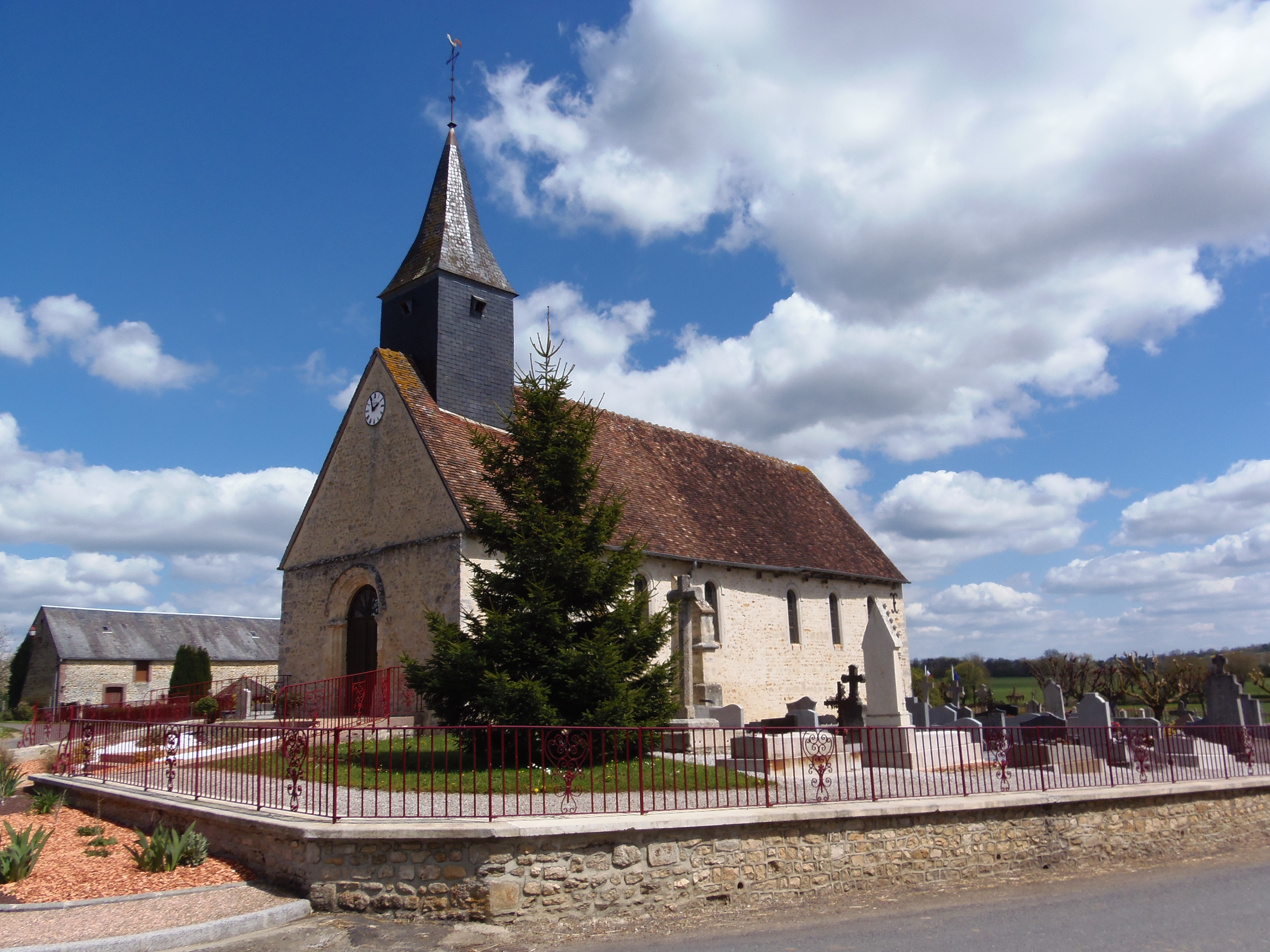
- The church in Le Ménil-Guyon
- Location of Le Ménil-Guyon
- Location within France Location within Normandy
- Coordinates: 48°34′59″N 0°17′44″E
- Country: France
- Region: Normandy
- Department: Orne
- Arrondissement: Alençon
- Canton: Écouves
- Intercommunality: Vallée de la Haute Sarthe

Government
  - Mayor (2020–2026): Yannick Levenez
- Area^{1}: 2.76 km^{2} (1.07 sq mi)
- Elevation: 172 m (564 ft)
- Highest elevation: 189 m (620 ft)
- Lowest elevation: 158 m (518 ft)
- Population (2023): 84
  - Density: 30/km^{2} (79/sq mi)
- Time zone: UTC+01:00 (CET)
  - Summer (DST): UTC+02:00 (CEST)
- INSEE/Postal code: 61266 /61170
- ^{1} French Land Register data, which excludes lakes, ponds, glaciers > 1 km^{2} (0.386 sq mi or 247 acres) and river estuaries.

Le Ménil-Guyon (French pronunciation: [lə menil ɡɥijɔ̃]) is a commune in the Orne department in north-western France.

== Geography ==
Le Ménil-Guyon is made up of the following collection of villages and hamlets, Le Ménil-Guyon, La Pavillerie and Charbonnet.

A river, la Tanche flows through the commune.

== See also ==
- Communes of the Orne department
