= Barville, Orne =

Barville
- Commune
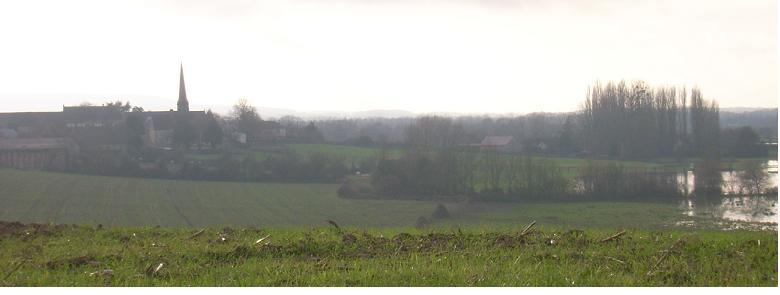
- A general view of Barville
- Location of Barville
- Location within France Location within Normandy
- Coordinates: 48°29′01″N 0°20′34″E
- Country: France
- Region: Normandy
- Department: Orne
- Arrondissement: Alençon
- Canton: Écouves

Government
  - Mayor (2020–2026): Bernard Leconte
- Area^{1}: 7.53 km^{2} (2.91 sq mi)
- Elevation: 161 m (528 ft)
- Highest elevation: 168 m (551 ft)
- Lowest elevation: 140 m (460 ft)
- Population (2023): 193
  - Density: 25.6/km^{2} (66.4/sq mi)
- Time zone: UTC+01:00 (CET)
  - Summer (DST): UTC+02:00 (CEST)
- INSEE/Postal code: 61026 /61170
- ^{1} French Land Register data, which excludes lakes, ponds, glaciers > 1 km^{2} (0.386 sq mi or 247 acres) and river estuaries.

Barville (French pronunciation: [baʁvil]) is a commune in the Orne department in north-western France.

== Geography ==
The commune is made up of the following collection of villages and hamlets, Barville, Blavette and Botrel.

The commune along with another 32 communes is part of a 3,503 hectare, Natura 2000 conservation area, called the Haute vallée de la Sarthe.

Two rivers, the Sarthe and the la Pervenche flows through the commune.

== Population ==
Historical population
Year	Pop.	±% p.a.
1968	210	—
1975	186	−1.72%
1982	181	−0.39%
1990	150	−2.32%
1999	153	+0.22%
2007	193	+2.95%
2012	197	+0.41%
2017	191	−0.62%
2023	193	+0.17%
Source: INSEE

== See also ==
- Communes of the Orne department
