= Larré, Orne =

Larré
- Commune
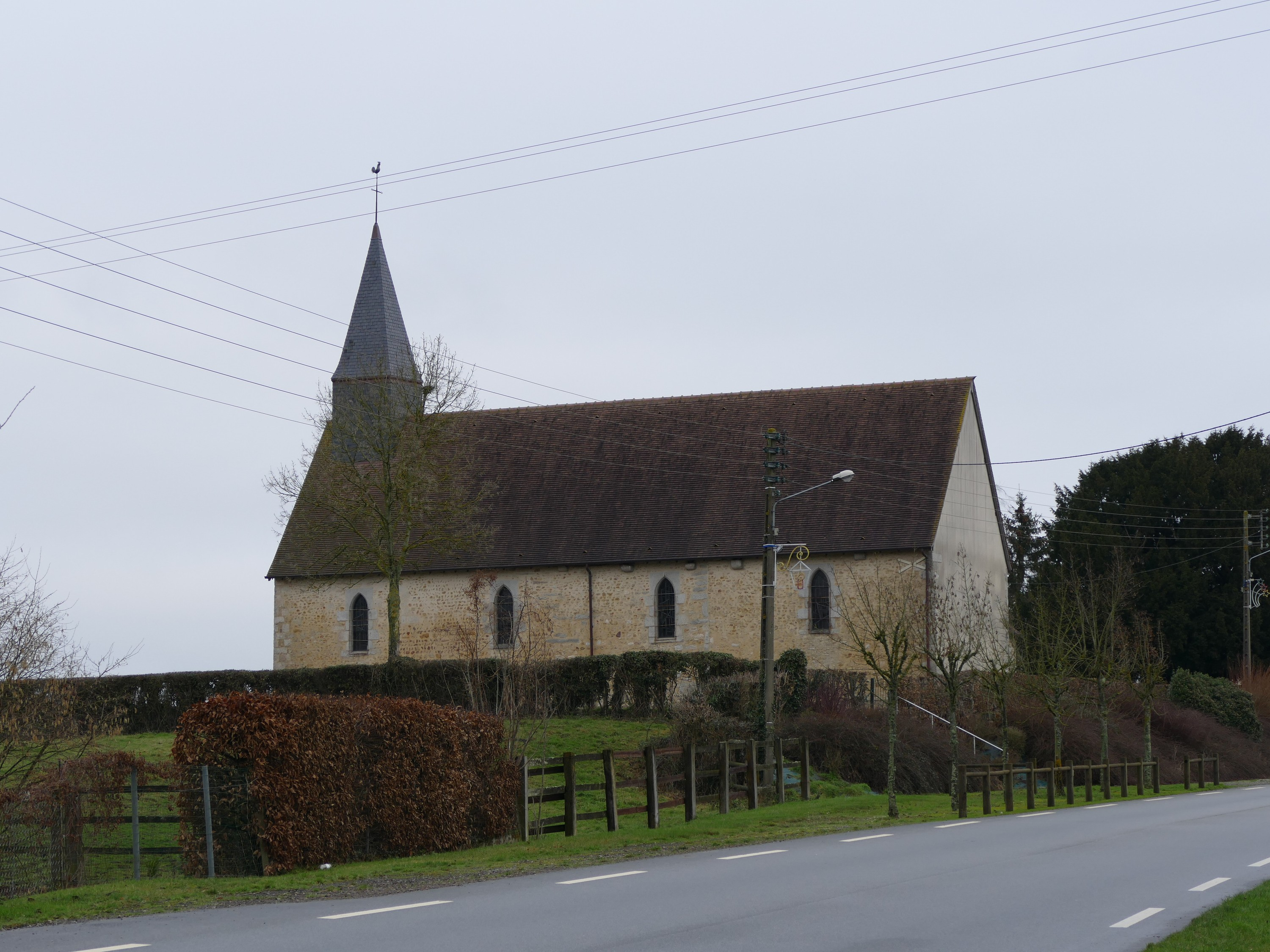
- The church in Larré
- Location of Larré
- Location within France Location within Normandy
- Coordinates: 48°29′43″N 0°09′55″E
- Country: France
- Region: Normandy
- Department: Orne
- Arrondissement: Alençon
- Canton: Écouves
- Intercommunality: CU Alençon

Government
  - Mayor (2020–2026): Maxence Sebert
- Area^{1}: 5.67 km^{2} (2.19 sq mi)
- Elevation: 180 m (590 ft)
- Highest elevation: 166 m (545 ft)
- Lowest elevation: 140 m (460 ft)
- Population (2023): 459
  - Density: 81.0/km^{2} (210/sq mi)
- Time zone: UTC+01:00 (CET)
  - Summer (DST): UTC+02:00 (CEST)
- INSEE/Postal code: 61224 /61250
- ^{1} French Land Register data, which excludes lakes, ponds, glaciers > 1 km^{2} (0.386 sq mi or 247 acres) and river estuaries.

Larré (French pronunciation: [laʁe]) is a commune in the Orne department in north-western France.

== Geography ==
Larré is made up of the following collection of villages and hamlets, La Fleurière, Les Rues, La Pettevinière, Larré, La Bénarderie, La Raiterie and La Chapisière.

The commune is in the Normandie-Maine Regional Natural Park.

Two rivers le Betz and la Forêt perambulate through the commune.

== See also ==
- Communes of the Orne department
