= Arrondissement of Alençon =

Coordinates: 48°25′54″N 0°05′19″E

Alençon
- Arrondissement
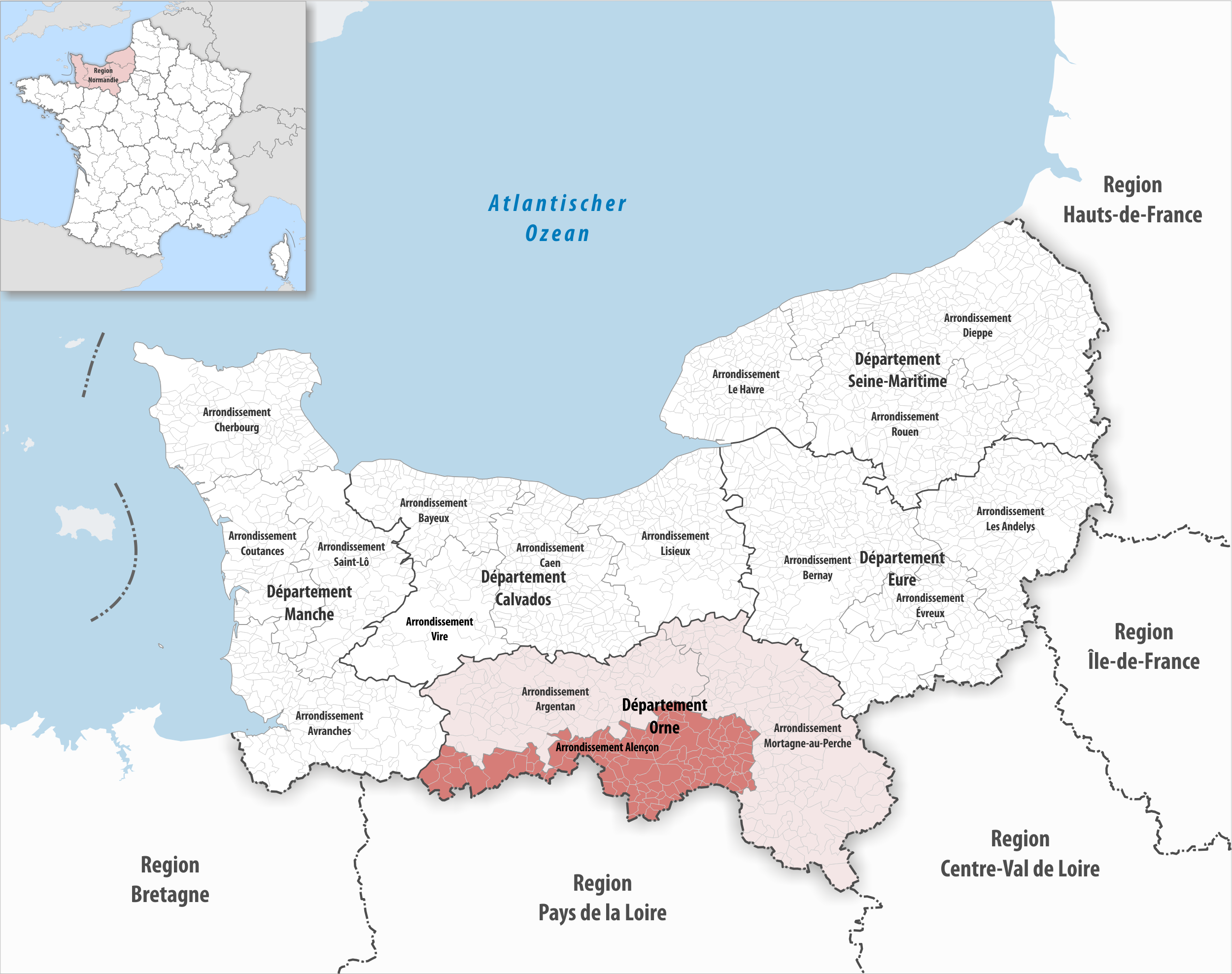
- Location within the region Normandy
- Country: France
- Region: Normandy
- Department: Orne
- No. of communes: {{{nbcomm}}}
- Area: 1,548.5 km^{2} (597.9 sq mi)
- Population (2023): 84,475
  - Density: 54.553/km^{2} (141.29/sq mi)
- INSEE code: 611

The arrondissement of Alençon is an arrondissement of France in the Orne department in the Normandy region. It has 111 communes. Its population is 84,879 (2021), and its area is 1,548.5 km^{2} (597.9 sq mi).

== Composition ==
The communes of the arrondissement of Alençon, and their INSEE codes, are:

1. Alençon (61001)
2. Almenêches
3. Aunay-les-Bois (61013)
4. Aunou-sur-Orne (61015)
5. Bagnoles de l'Orne Normandie (61483)
6. Barville (61026)
7. Beauvain (61035)
8. Belfonds (61036)
9. La Bellière
10. Boissei-la-Lande
11. Boitron (61051)
12. Le Bouillon (61056)
13. Brullemail (61064)
14. Buré (61066)
15. Bures (61067)
16. Bursard (61068)
17. Carrouges (61074)
18. Ceaucé (61075)
19. Le Cercueil (61076)
20. Cerisé (61077)
21. Chahains (61080)
22. Chailloué (61081)
23. Le Chalange (61082)
24. Le Champ-de-la-Pierre (61085)
25. La Chapelle-près-Sées (61098)
26. Le Château-d'Almenêches
27. La Chaux (61104)
28. Ciral (61107)
29. Colombiers (61111)
30. Condé-sur-Sarthe (61117)
31. Coulonges-sur-Sarthe (61126)
32. Courtomer (61133)
33. Cuissai (61141)
34. Damigny (61143)
35. Essay (61156)
36. Écouves (61341)
37. La Ferrière-Béchet (61164)
38. La Ferrière-Bochard (61165)
39. Ferrières-la-Verrerie (61166)
40. Francheville
41. Gandelain (61182)
42. Gâprée (61183)
43. Hauterive (61202)
44. Héloup (61203)
45. Joué-du-Bois (61209)
46. Juvigny-Val-d'Andaine (61211)
47. Lalacelle (61213)
48. Laleu (61215)
49. La Lande-de-Goult (61216)
50. Larré (61224)
51. Lonrai (61234)
52. Macé (61240)
53. Magny-le-Désert (61243)
54. Mantilly (61248)
55. Marchemaisons (61251)
56. Médavy
57. Méhoudin (61257)
58. Le Mêle-sur-Sarthe (61258)
59. Le Ménil-Broût (61261)
60. Ménil-Erreux (61263)
61. Le Ménil-Guyon (61266)
62. Le Ménil-Scelleur (61271)
63. Mieuxcé (61279)
64. Montchevrel (61284)
65. Montmerrei
66. Mortrée
67. La Motte-Fouquet (61295)
68. Neauphe-sous-Essai (61301)
69. Neuilly-le-Bisson (61304)
70. L'Orée-d'Écouves (61228)
71. Pacé (61321)
72. Passais-Villages (61324)
73. Perrou (61326)
74. Le Plantis (61331)
75. Rives-d'Andaine (61096)
76. La Roche-Mabile (61350)
77. Rouperroux (61357)
78. Saint-Agnan-sur-Sarthe (61360)
79. Saint-Aubin-d'Appenai (61365)
80. Saint-Céneri-le-Gérei (61372)
81. Saint-Denis-sur-Sarthon (61382)
82. Saint-Ellier-les-Bois (61384)
83. Sainte-Marguerite-de-Carrouges (61419)
84. Sainte-Marie-la-Robert (61420)
85. Sainte-Scolasse-sur-Sarthe (61454)
86. Saint-Fraimbault (61387)
87. Saint-Germain-du-Corbéis (61397)
88. Saint-Germain-le-Vieux (61398)
89. Saint-Gervais-du-Perron (61400)
90. Saint-Julien-sur-Sarthe (61412)
91. Saint-Léger-sur-Sarthe (61415)
92. Saint-Léonard-des-Parcs (61416)
93. Saint-Mars-d'Égrenne (61421)
94. Saint-Martin-des-Landes (61424)
95. Saint-Martin-l'Aiguillon (61427)
96. Saint-Nicolas-des-Bois (61433)
97. Saint-Ouen-le-Brisoult (61439)
98. Saint-Patrice-du-Désert (61442)
99. Saint-Quentin-de-Blavou (61450)
100. Saint-Roch-sur-Égrenne (61452)
101. Saint-Sauveur-de-Carrouges (61453)
102. Sées (61464)
103. Semallé (61467)
104. Tanville (61480)
105. Tellières-le-Plessis (61481)
106. Tessé-Froulay (61482)
107. Torchamp (61487)
108. Trémont (61492)
109. Valframbert (61497)
110. Les Ventes-de-Bourse (61499)
111. Vidai (61502)

== History ==
The arrondissement of Alençon was created in 1800. At the January 2017 reorganisation of the arrondissements of Orne, it gained nine communes from the arrondissement of Argentan and five communes from the arrondissement of Mortagne-au-Perche, and it lost 11 communes to the arrondissement of Argentan and one commune to the arrondissement of Mortagne-au-Perche.

As a result of the reorganisation of the cantons of France which came into effect in 2015, the borders of the cantons are no longer related to the borders of the arrondissements. The cantons of the arrondissement of Alençon were, as of January 2015:

1. Alençon-1
2. Alençon-2
3. Alençon-3
4. Carrouges
5. Courtomer
6. Domfront
7. La Ferté-Macé
8. Juvigny-sous-Andaine
9. Le Mêle-sur-Sarthe
10. Passais
11. Sées
