= La Lande =

La Lande may refer to:

== Places ==
- Boissei-la-Lande, a commune in the Orne department in northwestern France
- Camp de la Lande, also known as Calais Jungle, is a refugee and immigrant encampment
- La Lande-Chasles, a commune in the Maine-et-Loire department in western France
- La Lande-d'Airou, a commune in the Manche department in northwestern France in southwestern France.
- La Lande-sur-Eure, a former commune in the Orne department in northwestern France
- La Lande-de-Fronsac, a commune in the Gironde department in Nouvelle-Aquitaine
- La Lande-de-Goult, a commune in the Orne department in north-western France
- La Lande-de-Lougé, a commune in the Orne department in northwestern France
- La Lande Muree Formation, a geologic formation in France
- La Lande-Patry, a commune in the Orne department in northwestern France
- La Lande-Saint-Léger, a commune in the Eure department in Normandy in northern France
- La Lande-Saint-Siméon, a commune in the Orne department in northwestern France.
- La Lande-sur-Drôme, a former commune in Normandy in northwestern France
- Saint-Cyr-la-Lande, a commune in the Deux-Sèvres department in western France
- Saint-Germain-de-Tallevende-la-Lande-Vaumont, a former commune in the Calvados department in the Normandy region in northwestern France
- Saint-Jacques-de-la-Lande, a commune of Rennes Métropole in the Ille-et-Vilaine department of Britanny in northwestern France.
- Saint-Jean-de-la-Lande, Quebec, a municipality in Témiscouata Regional County Municipality in the Bas-Saint-Laurent region of Quebec, Canada.
- Saint-Jean-de-la-Lande, Chaudière-Appalaches, Quebec, a former parish municipality in Quebec
- Saint-Malo-de-la-Lande, a commune in the Manche department in Normandy in north-western France.
- Saint-Marc-la-Lande, a commune in the Deux-Sèvres department in western France

== People ==
- Jean de la Lande (died 1646), a Jesuit missionary at Sainte-Marie among the Hurons

== Others ==
- Chateau de la Lande, a list of what Chateau de la Lande may refer to
