= La Bellière =

La Bellière may refer to the following places in France:

- La Bellière, Orne, a commune in the Orne department
- La Bellière, Seine-Maritime, a commune in the Seine-Maritime department
