= Essai =

Essai may refer to:

- Essai (coin), an alternative term for a pattern coin
- Essaï Altounian, French Armenian singer

== See also ==
- Neauphe-sous-Essai, a commune in the Orne department in north-western France.
- Studio d'Essai, later called Club d'Essai, a center for the Resistance movement in French radio and, later, a center of musical activity
