= Vrigny =

Vrigny may refer to the following places in France:

- Vrigny, Loiret, a commune in the Loiret department
- Vrigny, Marne, a commune in the Marne department
- Vrigny, Orne, a commune in the Orne department
