= Boischampré =

- Commune
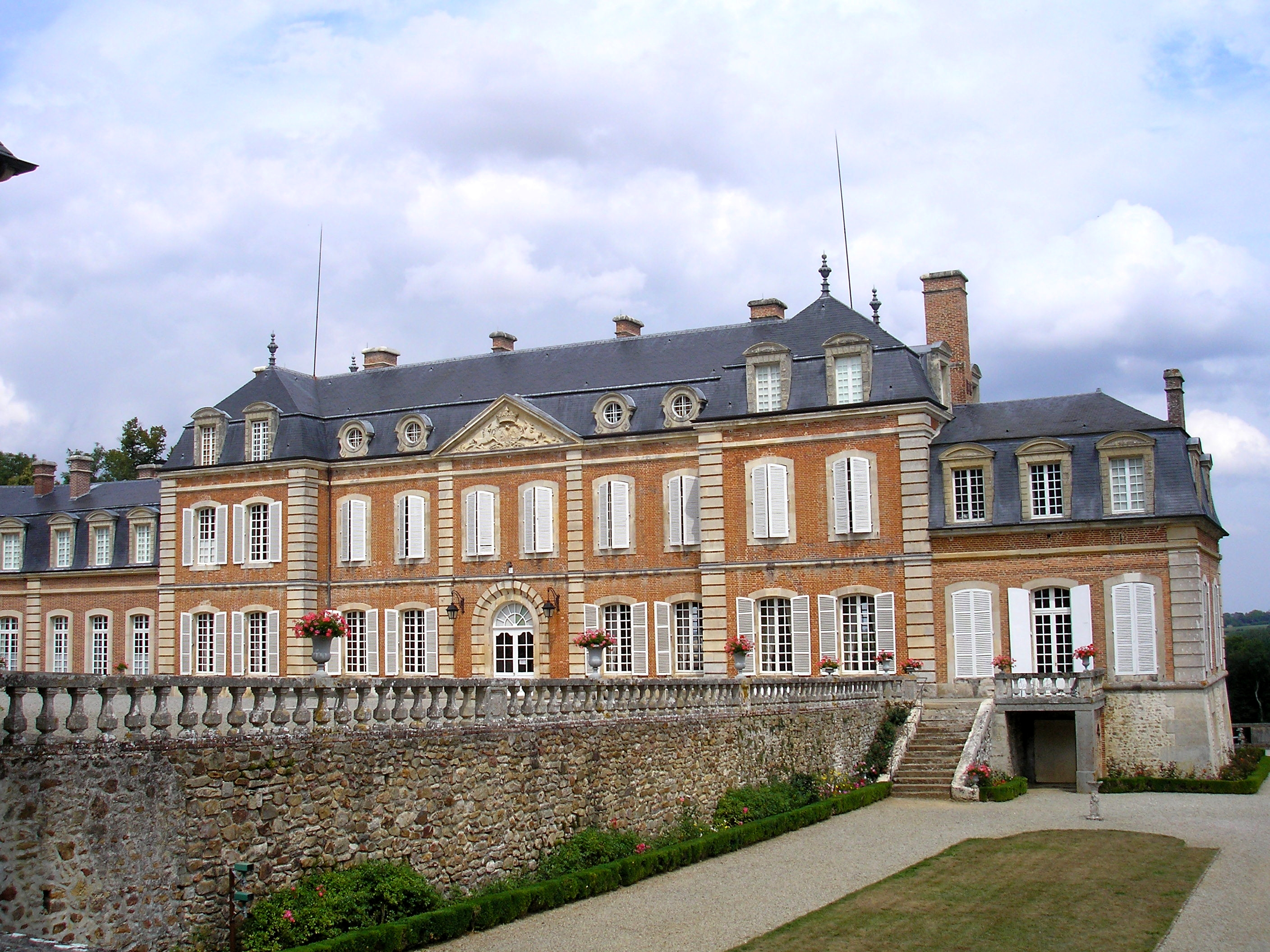
- The chateau of Sassy
- Location of Boischampré
- Location within France Location within Normandy
- Coordinates: 48°39′55″N 0°00′29″E
- Country: France
- Region: Normandy
- Department: Orne
- Arrondissement: Argentan
- Canton: Argentan-1
- Intercommunality: Terres d'Argentan Interco

Government
  - Mayor (2020–2026): Michel Lerat
- Area^{1}: 46.40 km^{2} (17.92 sq mi)
- Population (2023): 1,169
  - Density: 25.19/km^{2} (65.25/sq mi)
- Time zone: UTC+01:00 (CET)
  - Summer (DST): UTC+02:00 (CEST)
- INSEE/Postal code: 61375 /61570
- ^{1} French Land Register data, which excludes lakes, ponds, glaciers > 1 km^{2} (0.386 sq mi or 247 acres) and river estuaries.

Boischampré (French pronunciation: [bwaʃɑ̃pʁe]) is a commune in the Orne department in northwestern France. It was formed in 2015 by the merger of the former communes Saint-Christophe-le-Jajolet, Marcei, Saint-Loyer-des-Champs and Vrigny. The commune is part of the Forêt d'Écouves and Normandie-Maine Regional Natural Park.

== Geography ==
The commune is made up of the following collection of villages and hamlets, Le Bout de Bas, Le Moncel, Tercey, Boischampré, La Petite Rivière, La Grande Rivière, Les Landes, Le Poirier, Les Marais, Saint-Christophe-le-Jajolet, Les Rochers, Marcei, Les Rues, Flaugny and Benoise.

Parts of the commune make up the area, the Plaine d'Argentan, which is known for its cereal growing fields and horse stud farms.

Boischampré along with another 65 communes shares part of a 20,593 hectare, Natura 2000 conservation area, called the Haute vallée de l'Orne et affluents. In addition with another eight communes shares part of a 1,630 hectare, Natura 2000 conservation area, called Sites d'Ecouves.

The commune is within the Normandie-Maine Regional Natural Park and Forêt d'Écouves.

The Orne and the Baize are the two river running through the commune. In addition to the two rivers there are six streams flowing through the area, the Calvaire, the Rogneux, the Etangs, the Bel Usse, the Marais de Fleuriel and La Gironde.

== Notable buildings and places ==
Moulin de Tercey is a mill rebuilt in 1815 by Frin-Cormeray is listed as a Monument historique since 1995.

Manoir de la Baronnie is a 12th-century manor listed as a Monument historique since 1972.

Domaine du château de Sassy is an 18th-century chateau listed as a Monument historique since 1932. The gardens were designed by Achille Duchêne for Duke Etienne d'Audiffret-Pasquier. the garden is classified as a Jardins remarquables by the Ministry of Culture and the Comité des Parcs et Jardins de France.

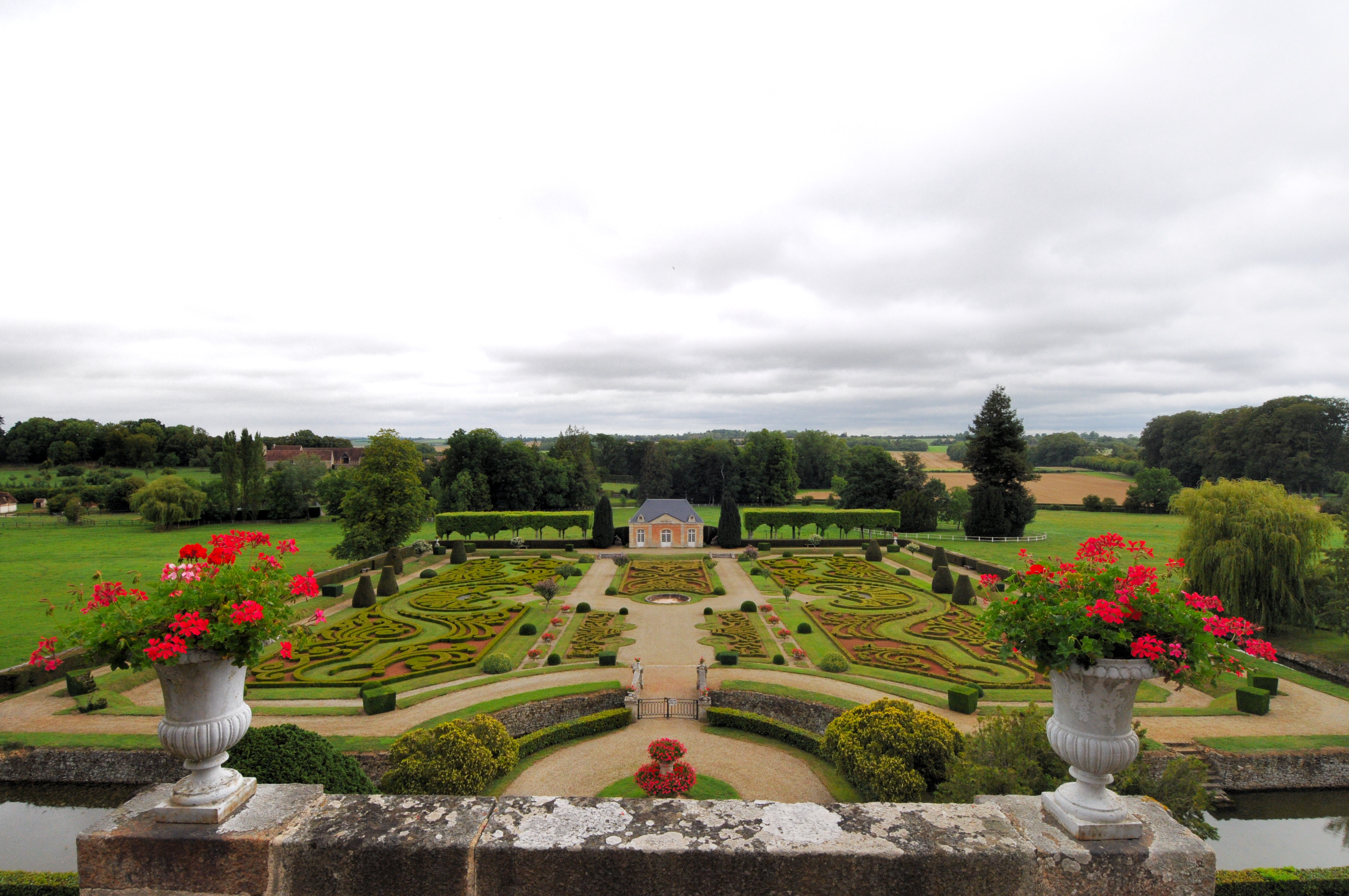
The garden of Château de Sassy

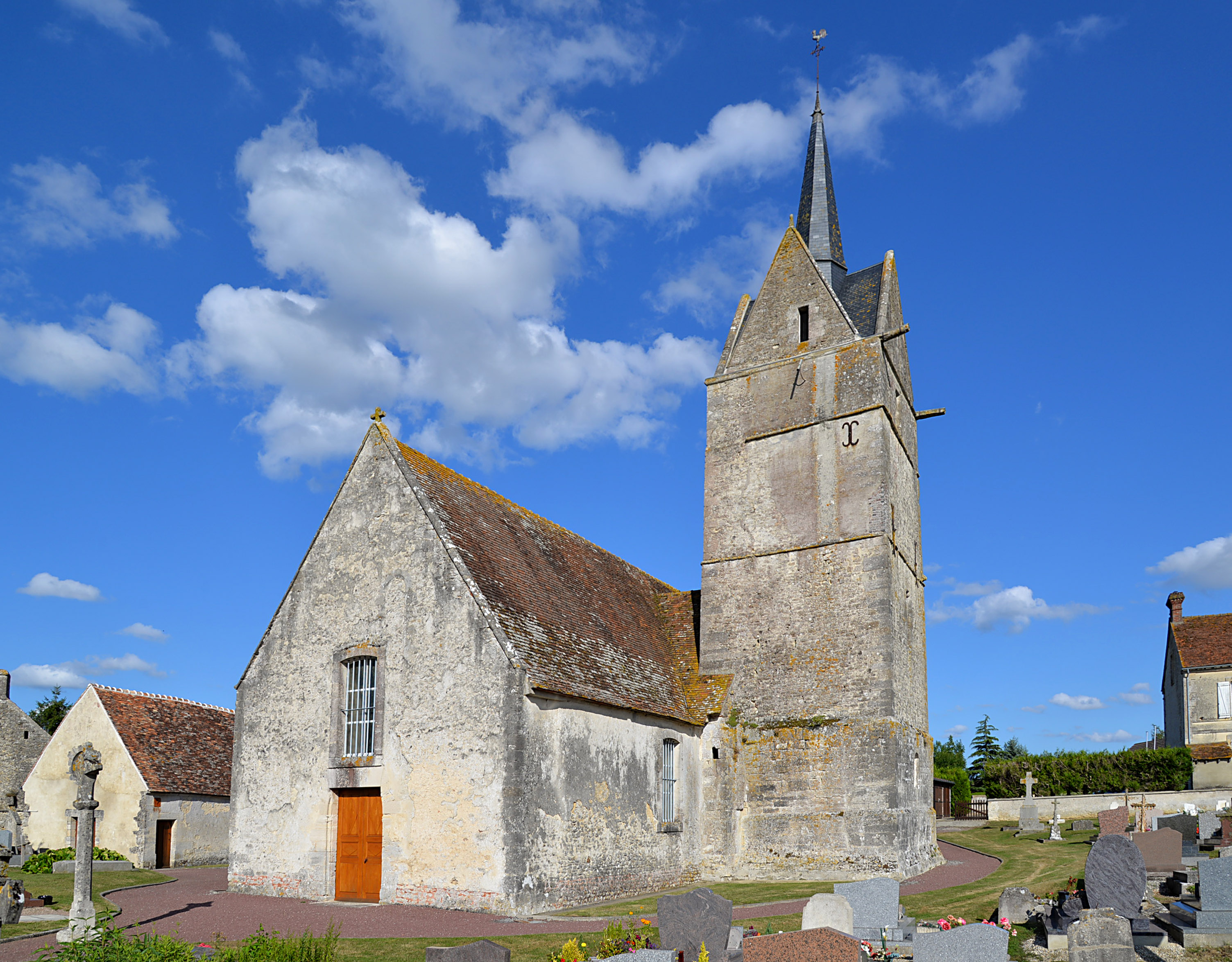
Saint-Loyer Church

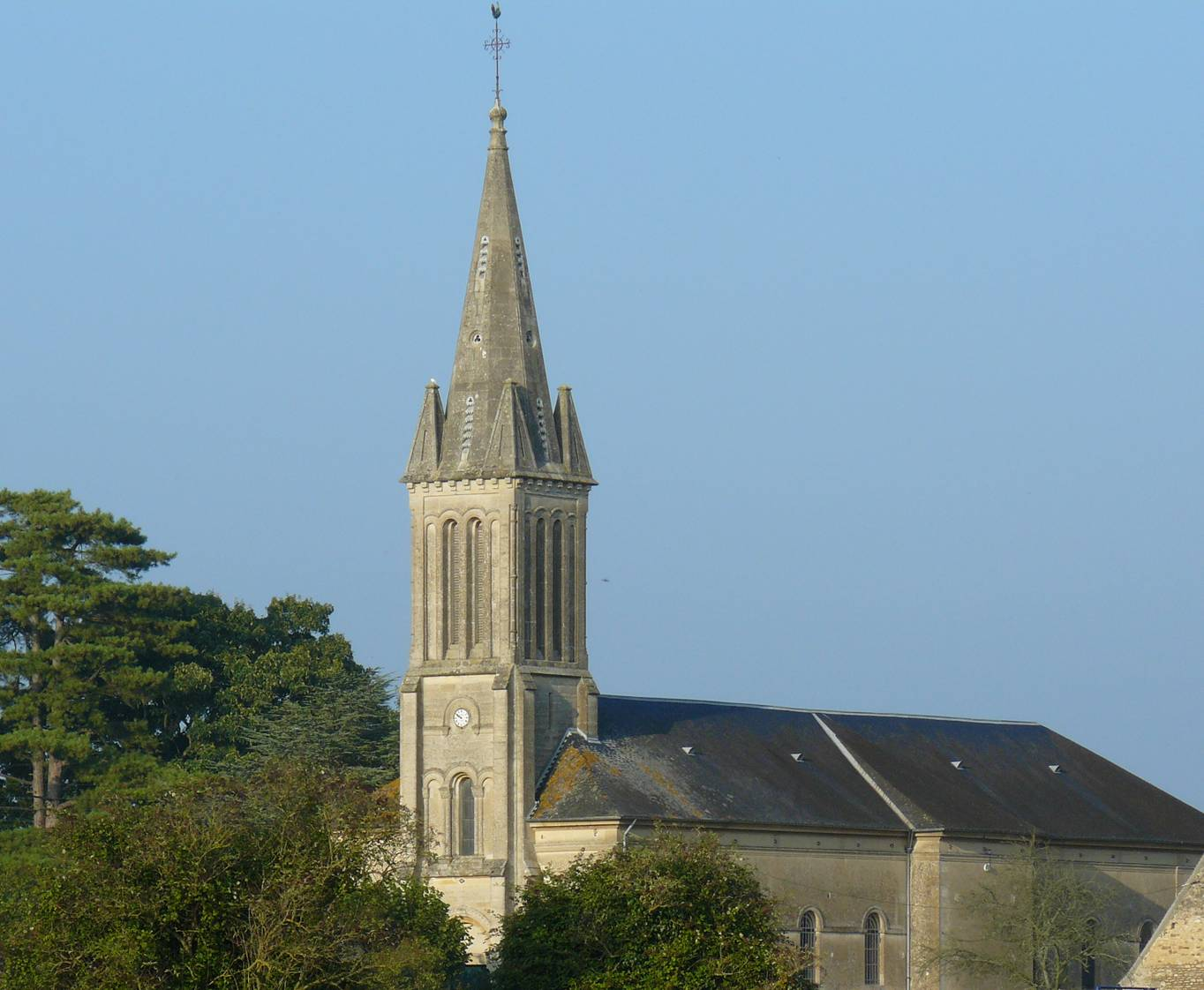
Vrigny Church

== Notable people ==
- Marie Emmanuelle Bayon Louis (1745 – 1825) a composer, pianist, and salonnière, was born here.
- Gaston d'Audiffret-Pasquier (1823 - 1905) a French politician and member of the Académie Française is buried here at the cimetière de Saint-Christophe-le-Jajolet.

== See also ==
- Communes of the Orne department
