= Le Cercueil =

- Commune
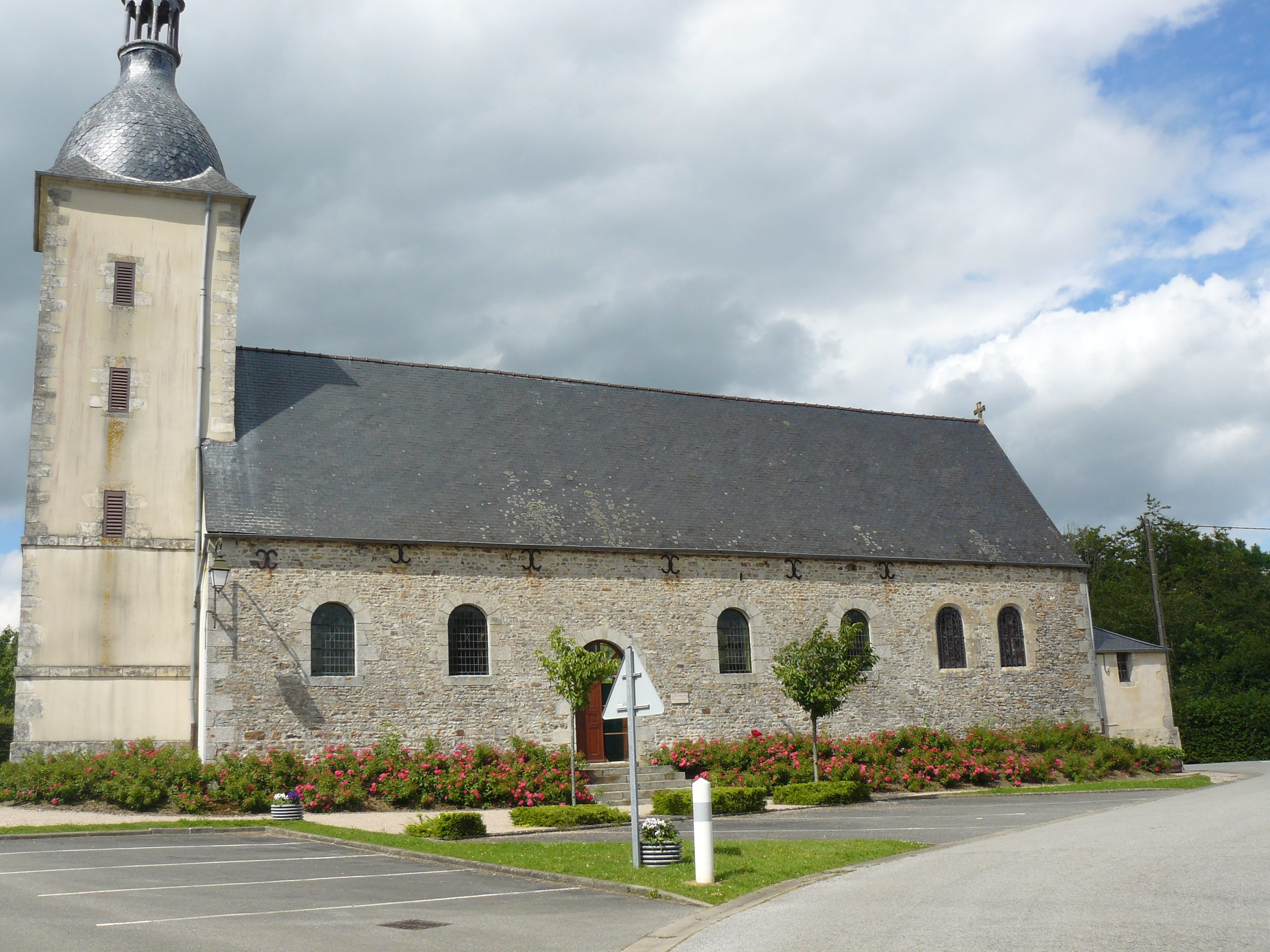
- The church in Le Cercueil
- Location of Le Cercueil
- Location within France Location within Normandy
- Coordinates: 48°35′52″N 0°01′26″E
- Country: France
- Region: Normandy
- Department: Orne
- Arrondissement: Alençon
- Canton: Sées
- Intercommunality: Sources de l'Orne

Government
  - Mayor (2020–2026): Stelliane Bettefort
- Area^{1}: 13.23 km^{2} (5.11 sq mi)
- Elevation: 363 m (1,191 ft)
- Highest elevation: 373 m (1,224 ft)
- Lowest elevation: 232 m (761 ft)
- Population (2023): 145
  - Density: 11.0/km^{2} (28.4/sq mi)
- Time zone: UTC+01:00 (CET)
  - Summer (DST): UTC+02:00 (CEST)
- INSEE/Postal code: 61076 /61500
- ^{1} French Land Register data, which excludes lakes, ponds, glaciers > 1 km^{2} (0.386 sq mi or 247 acres) and river estuaries.

Le Cercueil (French pronunciation: [lə sɛʁkœj]) is a commune in the Orne department in north-western France.

== Geography ==
The commune is made up of the following collection of villages and hamlets, Aprêl, La Gère, La Sevestrie and Le Cercueil.

It is 1,320 hectares (5.1 sq mi) in size. The highest point in the commune is 270 metres (890 ft).

The commune is within the Normandie-Maine Regional Natural Park and Forêt d'Écouves.

Le Cercueil along with another 65 communes is part of a 20,593 hectare, Natura 2000 conservation area, called the Haute vallée de l'Orne et affluents. In addition along with another eight communes shares part of a 1,630 hectare, Natura 2000 conservation area, called Sites d'Ecouves.

The commune has six watercourses flowing through it, la Thouane river, Clairefontaine stream, Vallees stream, Aprel stream, Cercueil stream and the Blanchelande stream.

== See also ==
- Communes of the Orne department
- Parc naturel régional Normandie-Maine
