= Tanville =

- Commune
- Location of Tanville
- Location within France Location within Normandy
- Coordinates: 48°34′09″N 0°00′32″E
- Country: France
- Region: Normandy
- Department: Orne
- Arrondissement: Alençon
- Canton: Sées
- Intercommunality: Sources de l'Orne

Government
  - Mayor (2020–2026): Jean-Marie Taupin
- Area^{1}: 13.32 km^{2} (5.14 sq mi)
- Elevation: 317 m (1,040 ft)
- Highest elevation: 406 m (1,332 ft)
- Lowest elevation: 255 m (837 ft)
- Population (2023): 227
  - Density: 17.0/km^{2} (44.1/sq mi)
- Time zone: UTC+01:00 (CET)
  - Summer (DST): UTC+02:00 (CEST)
- INSEE/Postal code: 61480 /61500
- ^{1} French Land Register data, which excludes lakes, ponds, glaciers > 1 km^{2} (0.386 sq mi or 247 acres) and river estuaries.

Tanville (French pronunciation: [tɑ̃vil]) is a commune in the Orne department in north-western France.

== Geography ==
The commune is made up of the following collection of villages and hamlets, Le Tertre, L'Être Perreaux, L'Aunai Géru, L'Être Haie and L'Être Ragaine.

The commune is within the Normandie-Maine Regional Natural Park and Forêt d'Écouves.

Tanville has two rivers that flow through its borders, La Senneviere & La Thouane, in addition to a single stream, Ruisseau de Blanchelande.

Tanville along with another 65 communes shares part of a 20,593 hectare, Natura 2000 conservation area, called the Haute vallée de l'Orne et affluents. In addition the commune along with another eight communes shares part of a 1,630 hectare, Natura 2000 conservation area, called Sites d'Ecouves.

== Notable buildings and places ==
=== National heritage sites ===
- Markers of Forêt d'Écouves a set of 80 markers positioned in the 18th century that mark the boundaries of the forest, they were registered as a Monument historique in 1987.

== See also ==
- Communes of the Orne department
- Parc naturel régional Normandie-Maine
