= La Ferrière-Béchet =

- Commune
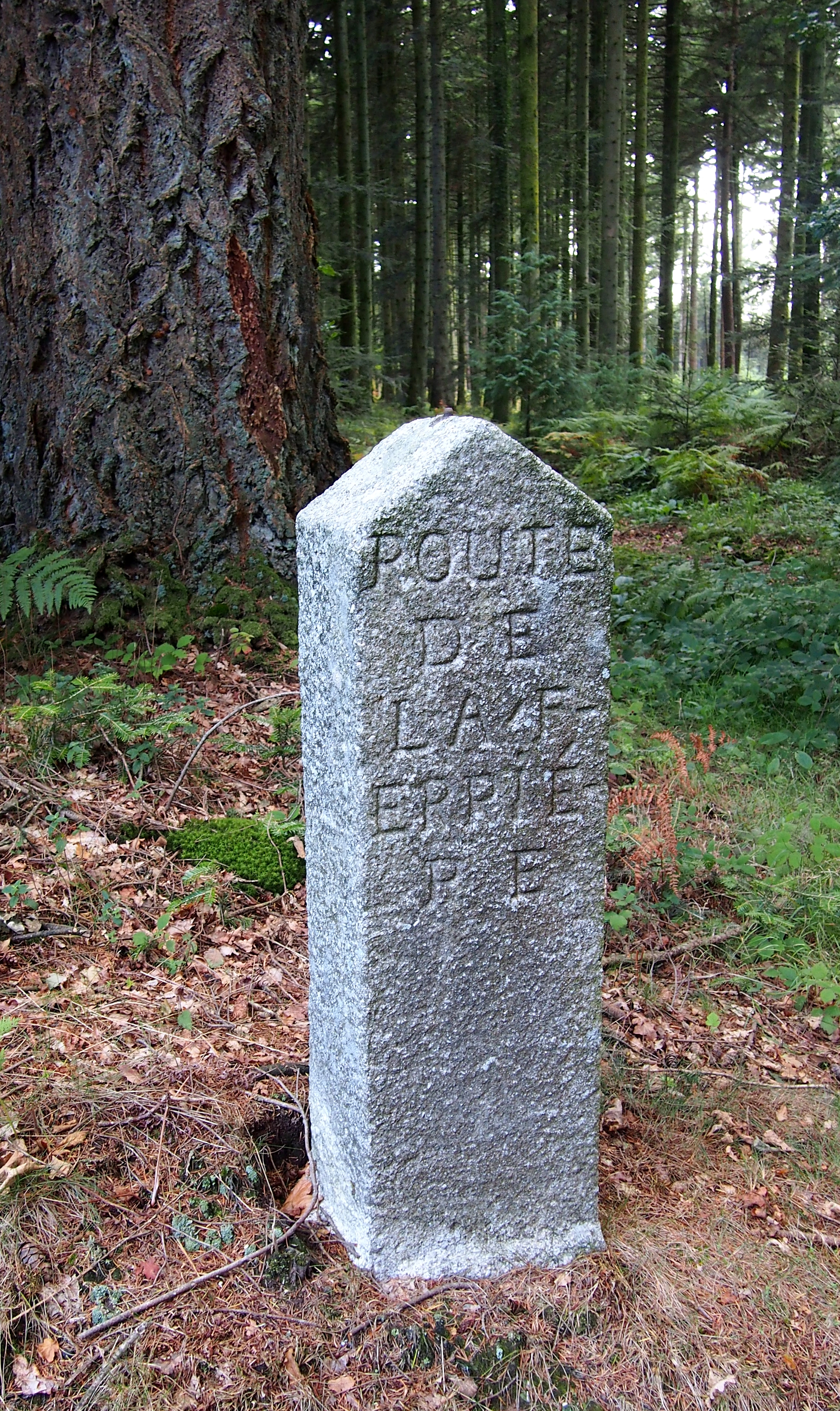
- Location of La Ferrière-Béchet
- Location within France Location within Normandy
- Coordinates: 48°34′50″N 0°04′21″E
- Country: France
- Region: Normandy
- Department: Orne
- Arrondissement: Alençon
- Canton: Sées
- Intercommunality: Sources de l'Orne

Government
  - Mayor (2022–2026): Christel Persehaye
- Area^{1}: 13.79 km^{2} (5.32 sq mi)
- Elevation: 300 m (980 ft)
- Highest elevation: 390 m (1,280 ft)
- Lowest elevation: 199 m (653 ft)
- Population (2023): 245
  - Density: 17.8/km^{2} (46.0/sq mi)
- Time zone: UTC+01:00 (CET)
  - Summer (DST): UTC+02:00 (CEST)
- INSEE/Postal code: 61164 /61500
- ^{1} French Land Register data, which excludes lakes, ponds, glaciers > 1 km^{2} (0.386 sq mi or 247 acres) and river estuaries.

La Ferrière-Béchet (French pronunciation: [la fɛʁjɛʁ beʃɛ]) is a commune in the Orne department in north-western France.

== Geography ==
The commune is made up of the following collection of villages and hamlets, Verdray, La Tourainnerie, Les Hayes, Les Hauts Champs and La Ferrière-Béchet.

It is 1,380 hectares (5.3 sq mi) in size. The highest point in the commune is 230 metres (750 ft).

The commune is within the Normandie-Maine Regional Natural Park and Forêt d'Écouves.

La Ferrière-Béchet along with another 65 communes is part of a 20,593 hectare, Natura 2000 conservation area, called the Haute vallée de l'Orne et affluents.

The Senneviere river, La Forêt stream and the Ponts Besnard stream are the three watercourses running through this area.

== Notable buildings and places ==
- Tourbière des Petits Riaux is a nature reserve set within a Peat bog, that features carnivorous plants.

=== National heritage sites ===
- Markers of Forêt d'Écouves a set of 80 markers positioned in the 18th century that mark the boundaries of the forest, they were registered as a Monument historique in 1987.

== See also ==
- Communes of the Orne department
- Parc naturel régional Normandie-Maine
