= Montmerrei =

- Commune
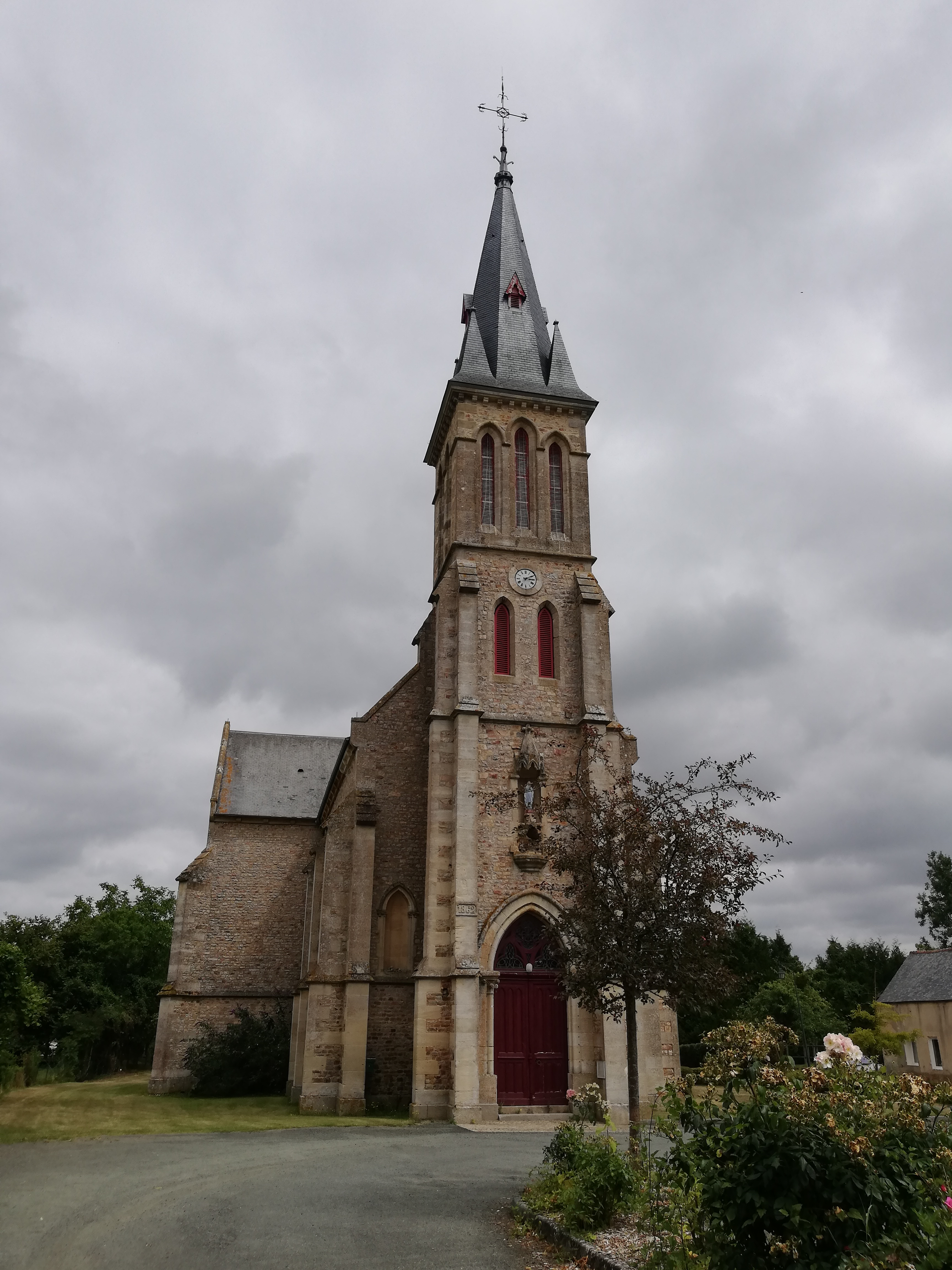
- Location of Montmerrei
- Location within France Location within Normandy
- Coordinates: 48°38′05″N 0°02′33″E
- Country: France
- Region: Normandy
- Department: Orne
- Arrondissement: Alençon
- Canton: Sées
- Intercommunality: Sources de l'Orne

Government
  - Mayor (2020–2026): Claude Duval
- Area^{1}: 12.67 km^{2} (4.89 sq mi)
- Elevation: 220 m (720 ft)
- Highest elevation: 333 m (1,093 ft)
- Lowest elevation: 175 m (574 ft)
- Population (2023): 560
  - Density: 44/km^{2} (110/sq mi)
- Time zone: UTC+01:00 (CET)
  - Summer (DST): UTC+02:00 (CEST)
- INSEE/Postal code: 61288 /61570
- ^{1} French Land Register data, which excludes lakes, ponds, glaciers > 1 km^{2} (0.386 sq mi or 247 acres) and river estuaries.

Montmerrei (French pronunciation: [mɔ̃mɛʁɛ]) is a commune in the Orne department in north-western France.

== Geography ==
The commune is made up of the following collection of villages and hamlets, La Villette, La Grande Forgé and Montmerrei.

It is 12,700 hectares (49.0 sq mi) in size. The highest point in the commune is 200 metres (660 ft).

Montmerrei along with another 65 communes shares part of a 20,593 hectare, Natura 2000 conservation area, called the Haute vallée de l'Orne et affluents. In addition the commune along with another eight communes shares part of a 1,630 hectare, Natura 2000 conservation area, called Sites d'Ecouves.

The commune is within the Normandie-Maine Regional Natural Park and Forêt d'Écouves.

The River Thouane, Landrion stream and Vallees stream are the three watercourses that flow through the commune.

== See also ==
- Communes of the Orne department
