= Marcei =

- Part of Boischampré
- Location of Marcei
- Location within France Location within Normandy
- Coordinates: 48°39′47″N 0°02′41″E
- Country: France
- Region: Normandy
- Department: Orne
- Arrondissement: Argentan
- Canton: Argentan-1
- Commune: Boischampré
- Area^{1}: 10.59 km^{2} (4.09 sq mi)
- Elevation: 250 m (820 ft)
- Highest elevation: 223 m (732 ft)
- Lowest elevation: 169 m (554 ft)
- Population (2022): 203
  - Density: 19.2/km^{2} (49.6/sq mi)
- Time zone: UTC+01:00 (CET)
  - Summer (DST): UTC+02:00 (CEST)
- Postal code: 61570
- ^{1} French Land Register data, which excludes lakes, ponds, glaciers > 1 km^{2} (0.386 sq mi or 247 acres) and river estuaries.

Marcei (French pronunciation: [maʁsɛ]) is a former commune in the Orne department in north-western France. In 2015 it became part of Boischampré.

== See also ==
- Communes of the Orne department
