= Francheville, Orne =

Francheville
- Commune
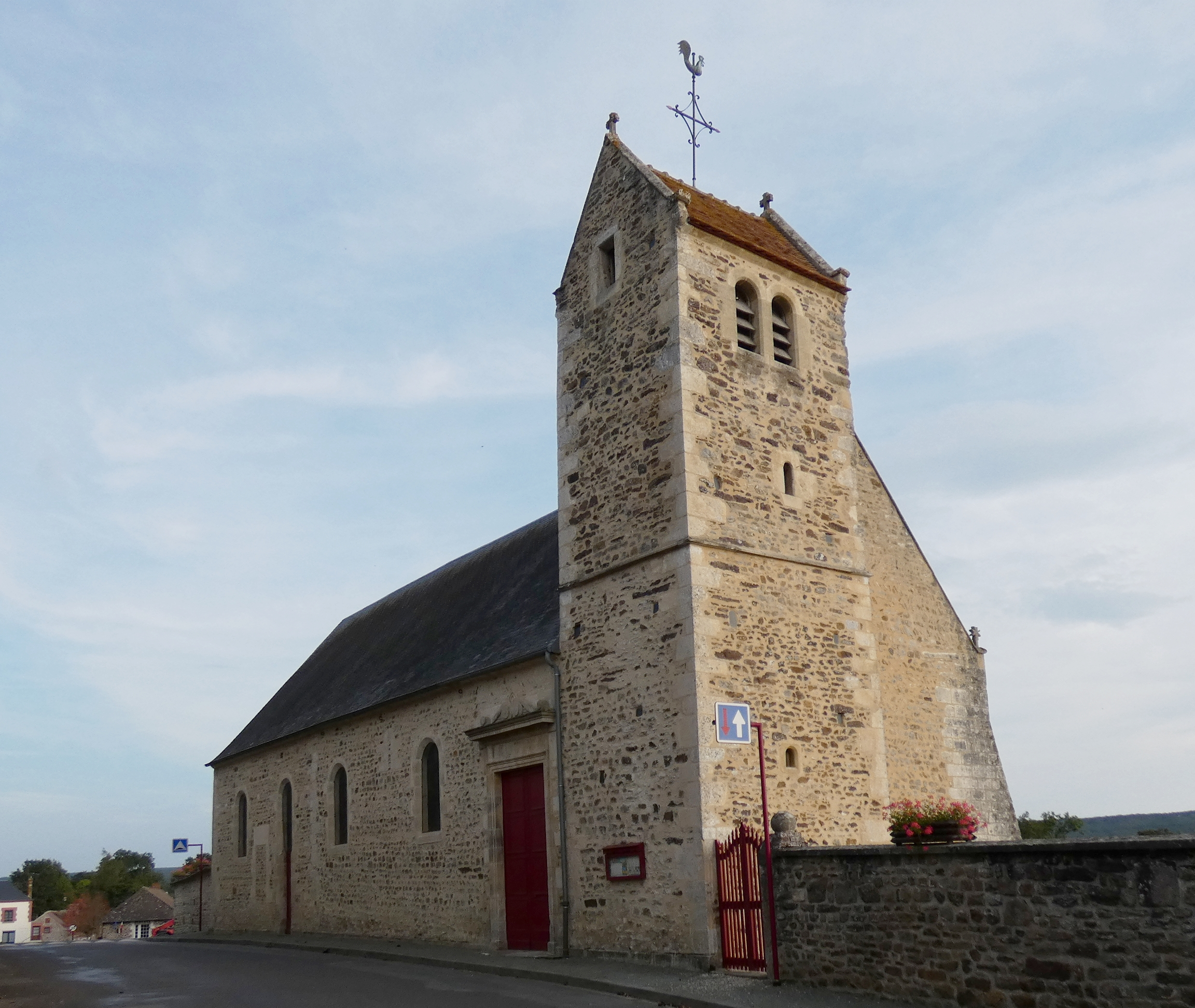
- Location of Francheville
- Location within France Location within Normandy
- Coordinates: 48°38′14″N 0°03′19″W
- Country: France
- Region: Normandy
- Department: Orne
- Arrondissement: Alençon
- Canton: Sées
- Intercommunality: Sources de l'Orne

Government
  - Mayor (2020–2026): Guy-Raoul d'Harambure
- Area^{1}: 9.72 km^{2} (3.75 sq mi)
- Elevation: 217 m (712 ft)
- Highest elevation: 287 m (942 ft)
- Lowest elevation: 170 m (560 ft)
- Population (2023): 130
  - Density: 13/km^{2} (35/sq mi)
- Time zone: UTC+01:00 (CET)
  - Summer (DST): UTC+02:00 (CEST)
- INSEE/Postal code: 61176 /61570
- ^{1} French Land Register data, which excludes lakes, ponds, glaciers > 1 km^{2} (0.386 sq mi or 247 acres) and river estuaries.

Francheville (French pronunciation: [fʁɑ̃ʃvil]) is a commune in the Orne department in north-western France.

== Geography ==
The commune is made up of the following collection of villages and hamlets, Mahey, La Pêcherie and Francheville.

It is 970 hectares (3.7 sq mi) in size. The highest point in the commune is 201 metres (659 ft).

The commune is within the Normandie-Maine Regional Natural Park and Forêt d'Écouves.

Francheville along with another 65 communes shares part of a 20,593 hectare, Natura 2000 conservation area, called the Haute vallée de l'Orne et affluents. In addition the commune along with another eight communes shares part of a 1,630 hectare, Natura 2000 conservation area, called Sites d'Ecouves.

Francheville has a total of five water courses running through it, the river Cance, Clairefontaine stream, Landrion stream, Etangs stream and the Landelles stream.

== See also ==
- Communes of the Orne department
- Parc naturel régional Normandie-Maine
