= Cance =

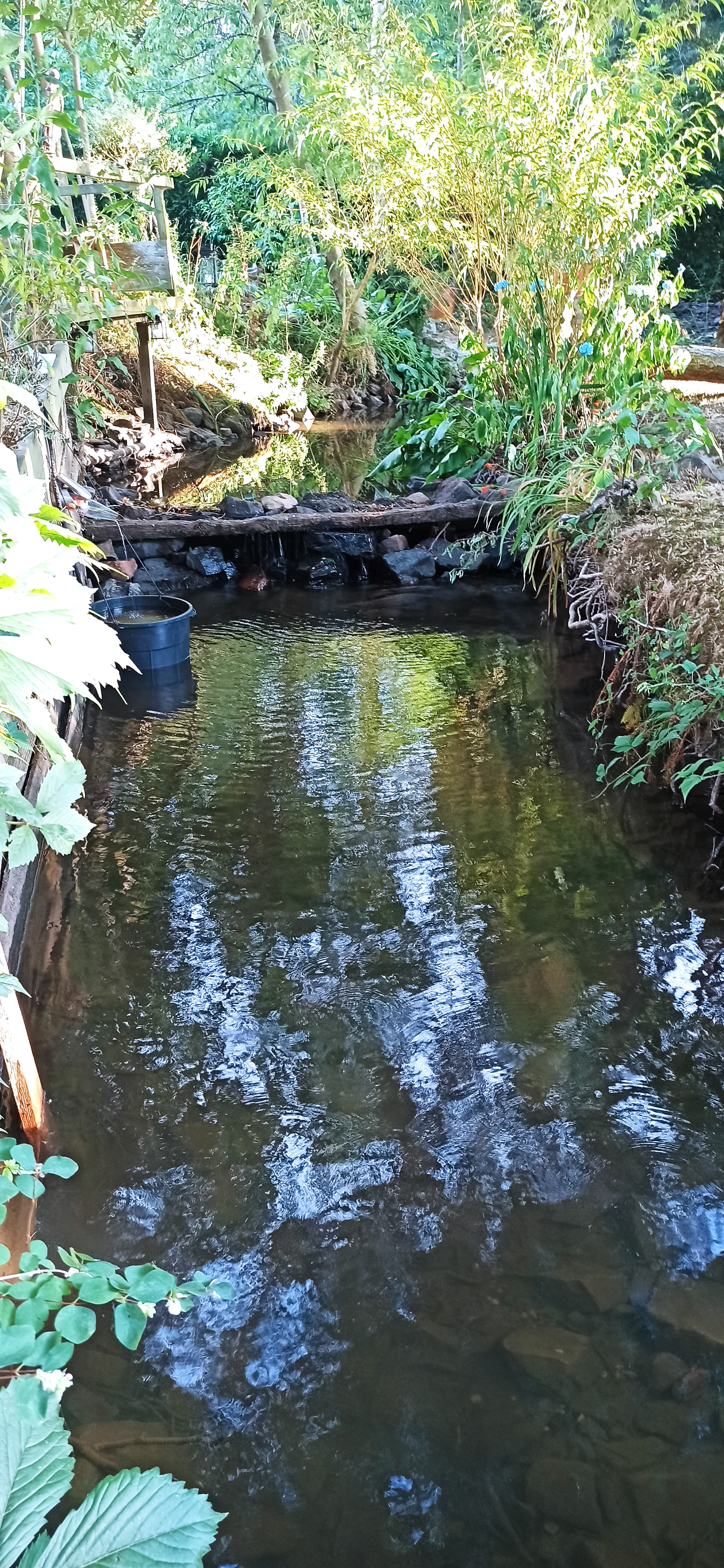
- The Cance flowing through Francheville

- Location within France Location within Normandy

Location
- Country: France

Physical characteristics
- Source
  - location: La Lande-de-Goult, Orne
- Mouth: Orne
  - coordinates: 48°34′18″N 0°01′34″W
- Length: 25.56 km (15.88 mi)

Basin features
- Progression: Orne→ English Channel

The Cance (French pronunciation: [kɑ̃s]) is a river in northwestern France, crossing the department of the Orne. It is 25.56 km long. Its source is in La Lande-de-Goult, and it flows into the river Orne in the commune of Écouché-les-Vallées.

The river flows through the area known as the Plaine d'Argentan.

== Tributaries ==
The three biggest tributaries for the Cance are:

1. Ruisseau des Landelles (11 km long)
2. Ruisseau de Clairefontaine (6 km long)
3. Ruisseau de Bel Usse (6 km long)

== Communes ==
The Cance passes through the following Communes:

1. Avoine
2. Boucé
3. Écouché-les-Vallées
4. Francheville
5. La Lande-de-Goult
6. Tanques
