= Le Bouillon =

- Commune
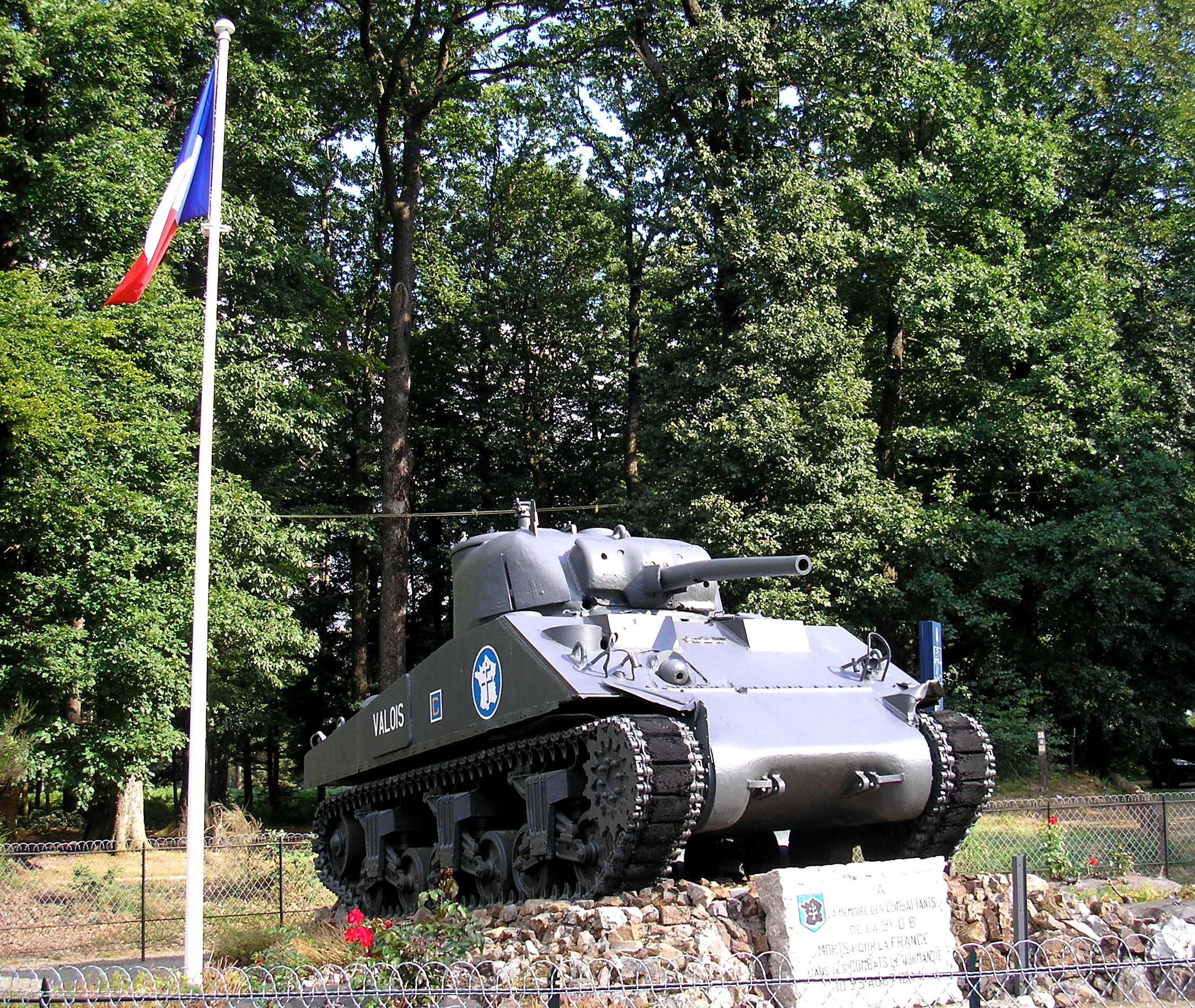
- A M4 Sherman tank at the cross of Médavy
- Location of Le Bouillon
- Location within France Location within Normandy
- Coordinates: 48°33′44″N 0°06′15″E
- Country: France
- Region: Normandy
- Department: Orne
- Arrondissement: Alençon
- Canton: Sées

Government
  - Mayor (2020–2026): Élisabeth Mesnel
- Area^{1}: 17.77 km^{2} (6.86 sq mi)
- Elevation: 400 m (1,300 ft)
- Highest elevation: 393 m (1,289 ft)
- Lowest elevation: 197 m (646 ft)
- Population (2023): 167
  - Density: 9.40/km^{2} (24.3/sq mi)
- Time zone: UTC+01:00 (CET)
  - Summer (DST): UTC+02:00 (CEST)
- INSEE/Postal code: 61056 /61500
- ^{1} French Land Register data, which excludes lakes, ponds, glaciers > 1 km^{2} (0.386 sq mi or 247 acres) and river estuaries.

Le Bouillon (French pronunciation: [lə bujɔ̃]) is a commune in the Orne department in northwestern France.

== Geography ==
The commune is made up of the following collection of villages and hamlets, Les Tertres, La Cheunière, La Foretterie, La Vallière, La Monnerie, Le Bouillon and L'Angle.

The commune is within the Normandie-Maine Regional Natural Park and Forêt d'Écouves.

La Briante is the sole watercourse that flows through the commune.

== Points of interest ==
- Parc Animalier d'Écouves is a zoo covering 18 hectares that was established in 2006. The zoo has over 400 animals.

=== National heritage sites ===
- Markers of Forêt d'Écouves a set of 80 markers positioned in the 18th century that mark the boundaries of the forest, they were registered as a Monument historique in 1987.

== Population ==
Historical population
Year	Pop.	±% p.a.
1968	154	—
1975	158	+0.37%
1982	138	−1.91%
1990	156	+1.54%
1999	151	−0.36%
2007	144	−0.59%
2012	169	+3.25%
2017	171	+0.24%
2023	167	−0.39%
Source: INSEE

== See also ==
- Communes of the Orne department
- Parc naturel régional Normandie-Maine
