= Saint-Christophe-le-Jajolet =

- Part of Boischampré
- Location of Saint-Christophe-le-Jajolet
- Location within France Location within Normandy
- Coordinates: 48°39′58″N 0°00′32″E
- Country: France
- Region: Normandy
- Department: Orne
- Arrondissement: Argentan
- Canton: Argentan-1
- Commune: Boischampré
- Area^{1}: 9.50 km^{2} (3.67 sq mi)
- Elevation: 174 m (571 ft)
- Highest elevation: 269 m (883 ft)
- Lowest elevation: 162 m (531 ft)
- Population (2022): 236
  - Density: 24.8/km^{2} (64.3/sq mi)
- Time zone: UTC+01:00 (CET)
  - Summer (DST): UTC+02:00 (CEST)
- Postal code: 61570
- ^{1} French Land Register data, which excludes lakes, ponds, glaciers > 1 km^{2} (0.386 sq mi or 247 acres) and river estuaries.

Saint-Christophe-le-Jajolet (French pronunciation: [sɛ̃ kʁistɔf lə ʒaʒɔlɛ]) is a former commune in the Orne department in north-western France. In 2015 it became part of Boischampré.

== See also ==
- Communes of the Orne department
- Parc naturel régional Normandie-Maine
