= Forêt d'Écouves =

Écouves Forest French: Forêt d'Écouves
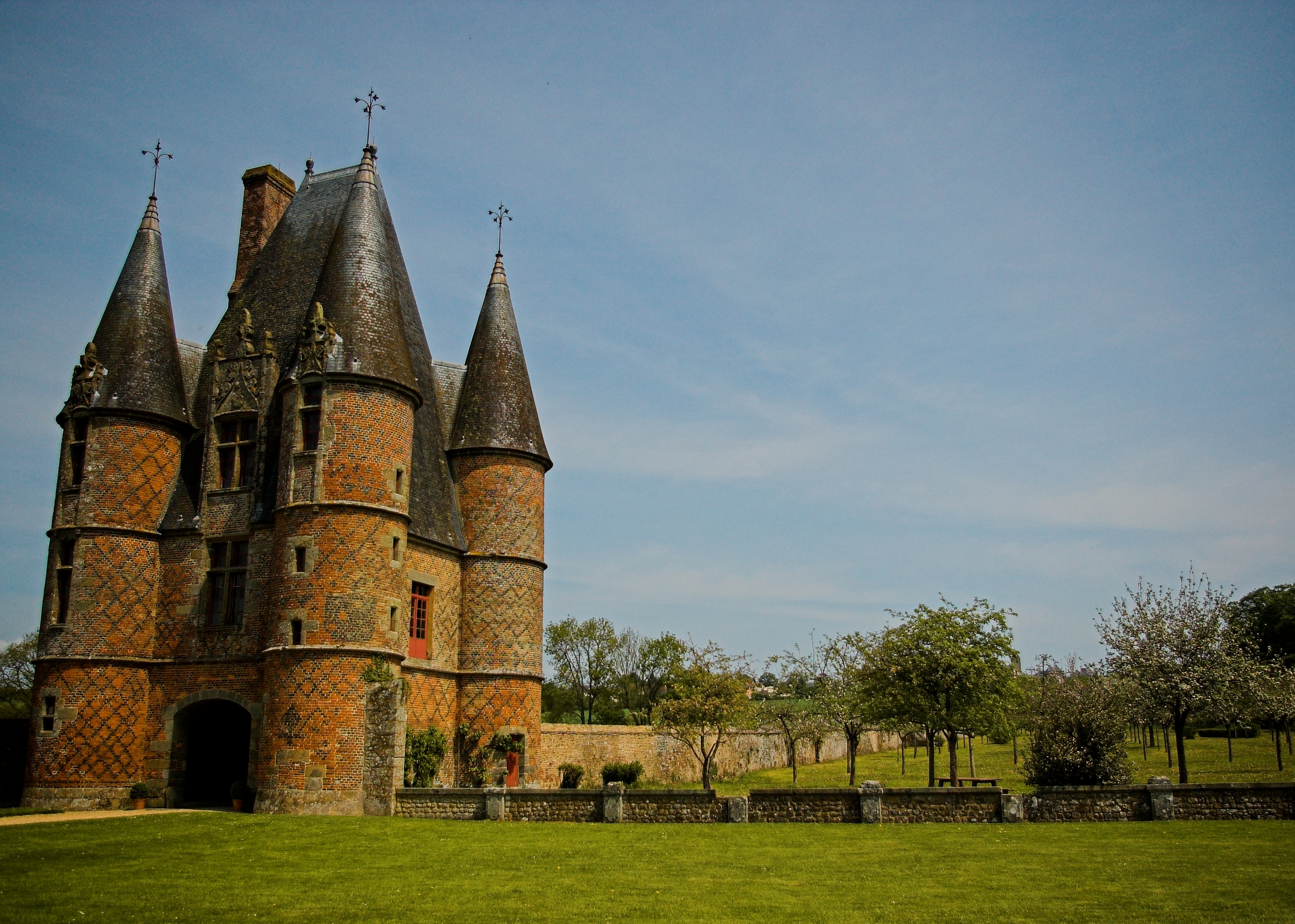
- The Château de Carrouges is located within the forest

- Location within France

Geography
- Location: Orne, Basse-Normandie, France
- Coordinates: 48°32′42″N 0°03′53″E
- Elevation: 100 to 417 metres (328 to 1,368 ft)
- Area: ≈ 15,000 ha (37,000 acres)

Administration
- Events: Falaise Pocket, Lothar storm
- Authority: Office national des forêts

Ecology
- Dominant tree species: Sessile oak, beech, Scots pine

The Forêt d'Écouves (French pronunciation: [fɔʁɛ dekuv]; transl. Écouves Forest) is a large area of woodland in the Normandy region of northern France.

== Location and topography ==
The forest is located in the Orne département of France, north of Alençon, between the communes of Carrouges in the west and Sées in the east. It covers an area of approximately 15,000 hectares (58 sq mi), being 18 kilometres (11 mi) east to west and between 8 and 10 kilometres (5.0 and 6.2 mi) wide. It is generally between 100 and 400 metres (330 and 1,310 ft) above sea level, although at one point the elevation rises to 417 metres (1,368 ft) above sea level, which is the highest point in all of Normandy.

The forest comprises part of the Normandie-Maine Regional Natural Park, founded in 1975, along with the Andaines and Perseigne forests.

=== Communes ===
The Forest is spread over 27 communes.

1. Boischampré
2. Chahains
3. Cuissai
4. Écouves
5. Fleuré
6. Francheville
7. Gandelain
8. La Bellière
9. La Chapelle-près-Sées
10. La Ferrière-Béchet
11. La Lande-de-Goult
12. La Roche-Mabile
13. Lalacelle
14. Le Bouillon
15. Le Cercueil
16. L'Orée-d'Écouves
17. Montmerrei
18. Mortrée
19. Neauphe-sous-Essai
20. Rouperroux
21. Saint-Denis-sur-Sarthon
22. Saint-Gervais-du-Perron
23. Saint-Nicolas-des-Bois
24. Saint-Sauveur-de-Carrouges
25. Sées
26. Tanques
27. Tanville

== Flora and fauna ==
Approximately 8,200 hectares (20,000 acres) of the land covered by the forest is varied planting of broad-leaved (mainly sessile oak and beech) and pine (mainly Scots pine) trees. It is well known for its varied wildlife, particularly deer and birds. Gray wolves were historically a common feature of the forest, the last recorded capture being in 1882.

The Lothar Storm hit the forest on 26 December 1999, with recorded gusts reaching 166 km/h (103 mph). This devastated 838 hectares (2,070 acres), felling 180,000 m^{3} (6,400,000 cu ft) of woodland (approximately 40% deciduous and 60% coniferous trees). The Office national des forêts authorities implemented a replanting programme shortly afterwards to restore the forest habitat.

== The Battle of Le Gatey ==
A significant skirmish took place in the forest in August 1944 as part of the wider battle of the Falaise Pocket. The 2nd French Armoured Division had landed at Utah Beach in Normandy on 1 August 1944, about two months after the D-Day landings, and served under General Patton's Third Army. Following the recapture of Alençon on 12 August 1944, the Division, led by General Leclerc, proceeded north towards Argentan. The armoured column entered the forest by the south in order to tackle the 9th Panzer Division, which was hidden in the forest. In Le Gateys, on the only road, a Sherman tank was hit by a German anti tank missile, resulting in the death of Colonel Rémy's eighteen-year-old son, Roger. At La Croix de Medavy, Sherman and Panzers clashed but the French were reinforced by the Putz armoured column which had recently set out from Sées. The following day, on 13 August 1944, the two French armoured columns, named Roumiantzoff and Putz, triumphed.

The small Les Gateys National Cemetery contains 19 soldiers from the 2nd French Armoured Division killed during the battle.

== Notable sites ==
- A 16th-century priory dedicated to St. Catherine of Alexandria
- The Château de Carrouges
- The Château d'Ô
- The Château de Sassy
- Two monuments from the Battle of Le Gatey - a small cemetery of nineteen French soldiers of the 2nd Armoured Division and a memorial to Roger Rémy.
- Parc Animalier d'Écouves is a zoo covering 18 hectares and has over 400 animals in Le Bouillon.

== The forest in art ==
The Écouves Forest is particularly present in the work of artists Georges Lacombe (1868–1916) and Charles Maundrell (1860-?1924)

== Current use ==
On the first Sunday of September each year, the forest is host to the Trans Écouves mountain biking event. This meeting of VTT (vélo tout terrain) enthusiasts has been part of the all-terrain biking scene since 1990. The event is usually based from Radon, a small commune in the south-east of the forest.
