= Saint-Loyer-des-Champs =

- Part of Boischampré
- Location of Saint-Loyer-des-Champs
- Location within France Location within Normandy
- Coordinates: 48°42′08″N 0°01′11″E
- Country: France
- Region: Normandy
- Department: Orne
- Arrondissement: Argentan
- Canton: Argentan-1
- Commune: Boischampré
- Area^{1}: 10.29 km^{2} (3.97 sq mi)
- Elevation: 200 m (660 ft)
- Highest elevation: 213 m (699 ft)
- Lowest elevation: 157 m (515 ft)
- Population (2022): 365
  - Density: 35.5/km^{2} (91.9/sq mi)
- Time zone: UTC+01:00 (CET)
  - Summer (DST): UTC+02:00 (CEST)
- Postal code: 61570
- ^{1} French Land Register data, which excludes lakes, ponds, glaciers > 1 km^{2} (0.386 sq mi or 247 acres) and river estuaries.

Saint-Loyer-des-Champs (French pronunciation: [sɛ̃ lwaje de ʃɑ̃]) is a former commune in the Orne department in north-western France. In 2015 it became part of Boischampré.

== See also ==
- Communes of the Orne department
