= Tanques =

- Commune
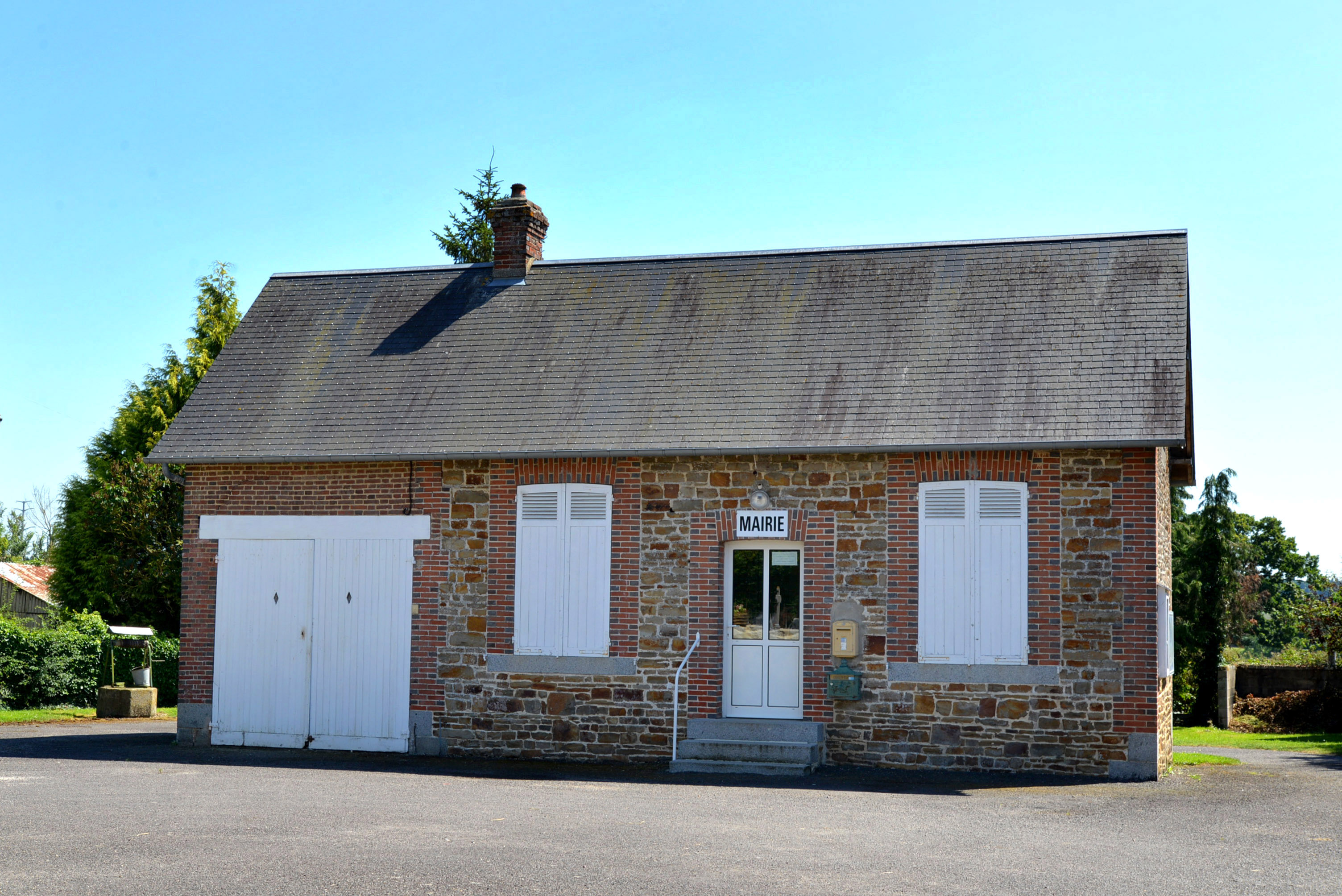
- The town hall in Tanques
- Location of Tanques
- Location within France Location within Normandy
- Coordinates: 48°41′17″N 0°04′19″W
- Country: France
- Region: Normandy
- Department: Orne
- Arrondissement: Argentan
- Canton: Magny-le-Désert
- Intercommunality: Terres d'Argentan Interco

Government
  - Mayor (2020–2026): Lucienne Morin
- Area^{1}: 6.22 km^{2} (2.40 sq mi)
- Elevation: 163 m (535 ft)
- Highest elevation: 234 m (768 ft)
- Lowest elevation: 153 m (502 ft)
- Population (2023): 157
  - Density: 25.2/km^{2} (65.4/sq mi)
- Time zone: UTC+01:00 (CET)
  - Summer (DST): UTC+02:00 (CEST)
- INSEE/Postal code: 61479 /61150
- ^{1} French Land Register data, which excludes lakes, ponds, glaciers > 1 km^{2} (0.386 sq mi or 247 acres) and river estuaries.

Tanques (French pronunciation: [tɑ̃k]) is a commune in the Orne department in north-western France.

== Geography ==
The commune is made up of the following collection of villages and hamlets, Mengné, Les Coudraies and Tanques.

The commune is within the area known as the Plaine d'Argentan, which is known for its cereal growing fields and horse stud farms.

The commune is within the Normandie-Maine Regional Natural Park and Forêt d'Écouves.

Tanques along with another 65 communes is part of a 20,593 hectare, Natura 2000 conservation area, called the Haute vallée de l'Orne et affluents.

It is 620 hectares (2.4 sq mi) in size. The highest point in the commune is 166 metres (545 ft). The River Cance, Marais de Fleuriel stream and the Bel Usse stream flow through the commune.

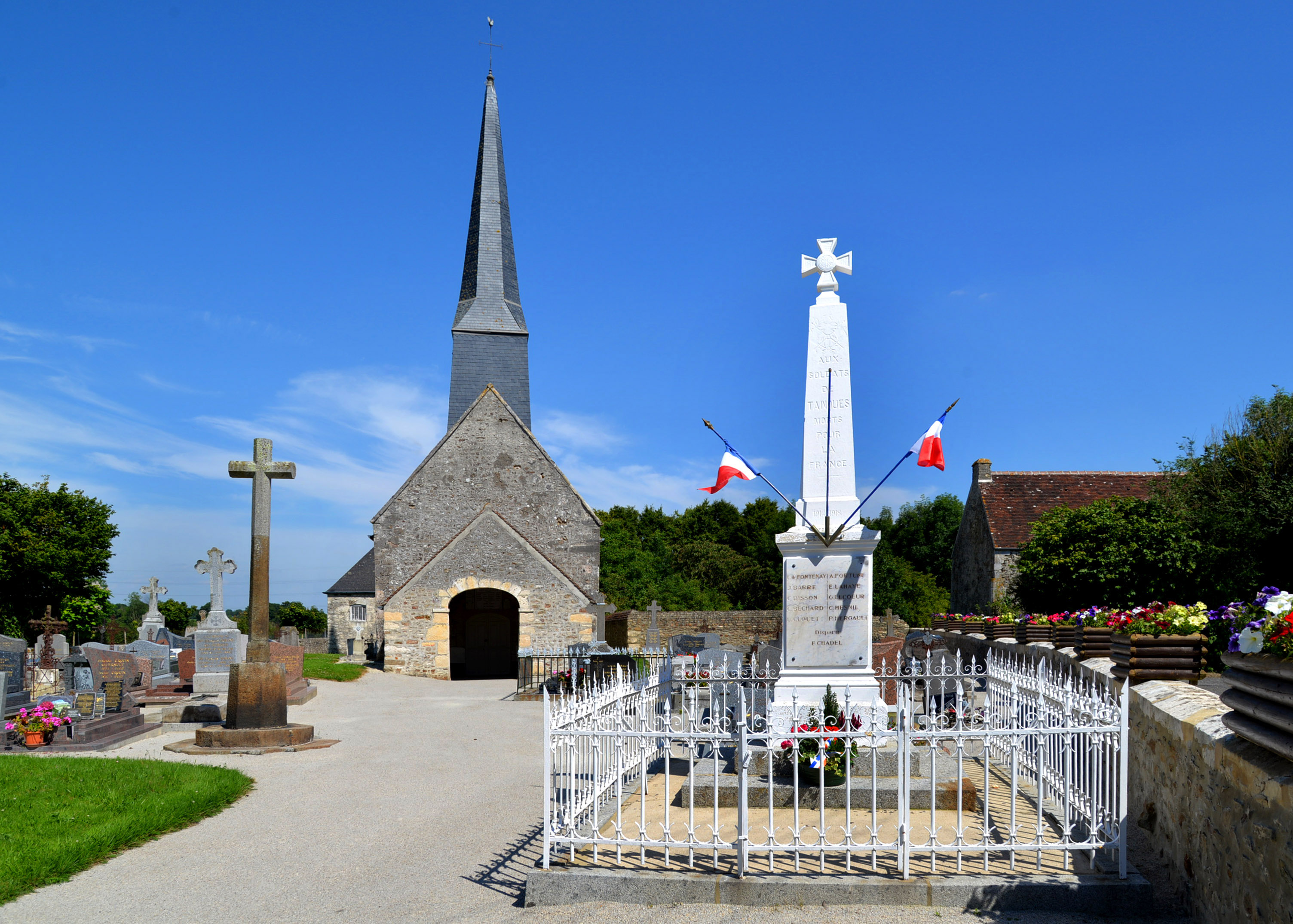
Saint-Pierre Church and War memorial

== See also ==
- Communes of the Orne department
- Château de la Motte, Joué du Plain
