= Sites d'Ecouves =

Sites d'Ecouves is a Natura 2000 site within the Orne department. The protected area is based on the Cance River.

== Geography ==
The area is 1,630 hectares in size and is located on one of the last foothills of the eastern Armorican base, the Ecouves massif.

It is spread across nine different communes all within the Orne department;

1. La Bellière
2. Boischampré
3. Boucé
4. Le Cercueil
5. Fleuré
6. Francheville
7. La Lande-de-Goult
8. Montmerrei
9. Tanville

Some of the protected site is within the Normandie-Maine Regional Natural Park.

== Conservation ==
The conservation area has eighteen species listed in Annex 2 of the Habitats Directive;

1. Northern crested newt
2. European bullhead
3. Cottus perifretum
4. Brook lamprey
5. White-clawed crayfish
6. Marsh fritillary
7. Jersey tiger
8. European stag beetle
9. Eurasian otter

In addition the Natura 2000 site has 14 habitats protected under the Habitats Directive.
