= Fleuré, Orne =

Fleuré
- Commune
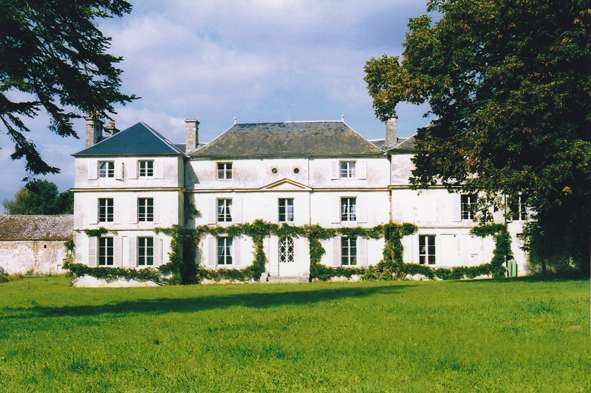
- The chateau in Fleuré
- Location of Fleuré
- Location within France Location within Normandy
- Coordinates: 48°41′29″N 0°03′20″W
- Country: France
- Region: Normandy
- Department: Orne
- Arrondissement: Argentan
- Canton: Magny-le-Désert
- Intercommunality: Terres d'Argentan Interco

Government
  - Mayor (2020–2026): Thierry Clérembaux
- Area^{1}: 11.8 km^{2} (4.6 sq mi)
- Elevation: 164 m (538 ft)
- Highest elevation: 265 m (869 ft)
- Lowest elevation: 156 m (512 ft)
- Population (2023): 203
  - Density: 17.2/km^{2} (44.6/sq mi)
- Time zone: UTC+01:00 (CET)
  - Summer (DST): UTC+02:00 (CEST)
- INSEE/Postal code: 61170 /61200
- ^{1} French Land Register data, which excludes lakes, ponds, glaciers > 1 km^{2} (0.386 sq mi or 247 acres) and river estuaries.

Fleuré (French pronunciation: [flœʁe]) is a commune in the Orne department in north-western France.

== Geography ==
The commune is made up of the following collection of villages and hamlets, Fleuriel and Fleuré.

Parts of the commune make up the area, the Plaine d'Argentan, which is known for its cereal growing fileds and horse stud farms.

It is 1,180 hectares (4.6 sq mi) in size. The highest point in the commune is 165 metres (541 ft).

Fleuré along with another 65 communes shares part of a 20,593 hectare, Natura 2000 conservation area, called the Haute vallée de l'Orne et affluents. In addition the commune along with another eight communes shares part of a 1,630 hectare, Natura 2000 conservation area, called Sites d'Ecouves.

The Etangs stream, Marais de Fleuriel stream and the Bel Usse stream flow through the commune.

The commune is within the Normandie-Maine Regional Natural Park and Forêt d'Écouves.

== Notable buildings and places ==
- Stèle Étienne Panthou is a memorial remembering where a French Resistance fighter, Étienne Panthou, and an unknown person were executed in June 1944.
The Mayors office and Church

Stèle Étienne Panthou

== See also ==
- Communes of the Orne department
- Château de la Motte, Joué du Plain
