= Parc Animalier d'Écouves =

- Interactive map of Parc Animalier d'Écouves
- 48°34′1″N 0°8′9″E
- Date opened: 2006
- Location: Le Bouillon, France
- Land area: 12 hectares
- No. of animals: 400 (2025)
- No. of species: 45 (2024)
- Annual visitors: 38,000
- Memberships: The French Association of Zoological Parks (AFdPZ)
- Website: park-animal-ecouves.com

Parc Animalier d'Écouves is a zoological park in Le Bouillon, Orne department of France. It is within the area known as the Forêt d'Écouves.

The park covers an area of 12 hectares (30 acres). It contains 45 separate species of animals.

The Park is open from February to November. It receives approximately 38,000 visitors per year.

The park is one of the members of The French Association of Zoological Parks (AFdPZ).
