= Canton of Sées =

Coordinates: 48.60°N 0.17°E

The canton of Sées is an administrative division of the Orne department, northwestern France. Its borders were modified at the French canton reorganisation which came into effect in March 2015. Its seat is in Sées.

It consists of the following communes:

1. Almenêches
2. Aunou-sur-Orne
3. Belfonds
4. La Bellière
5. Boissei-la-Lande
6. Boitron
7. Le Bouillon
8. Le Cercueil
9. Chailloué
10. La Chapelle-près-Sées
11. Le Château-d'Almenêches
12. La Ferrière-Béchet
13. Francheville
14. Macé
15. Médavy
16. Montmerrei
17. Mortrée
18. Neauphe-sous-Essai
19. Saint-Gervais-du-Perron
20. Sées
21. Tanville
