= Boucé, Orne =

Boucé
- Commune
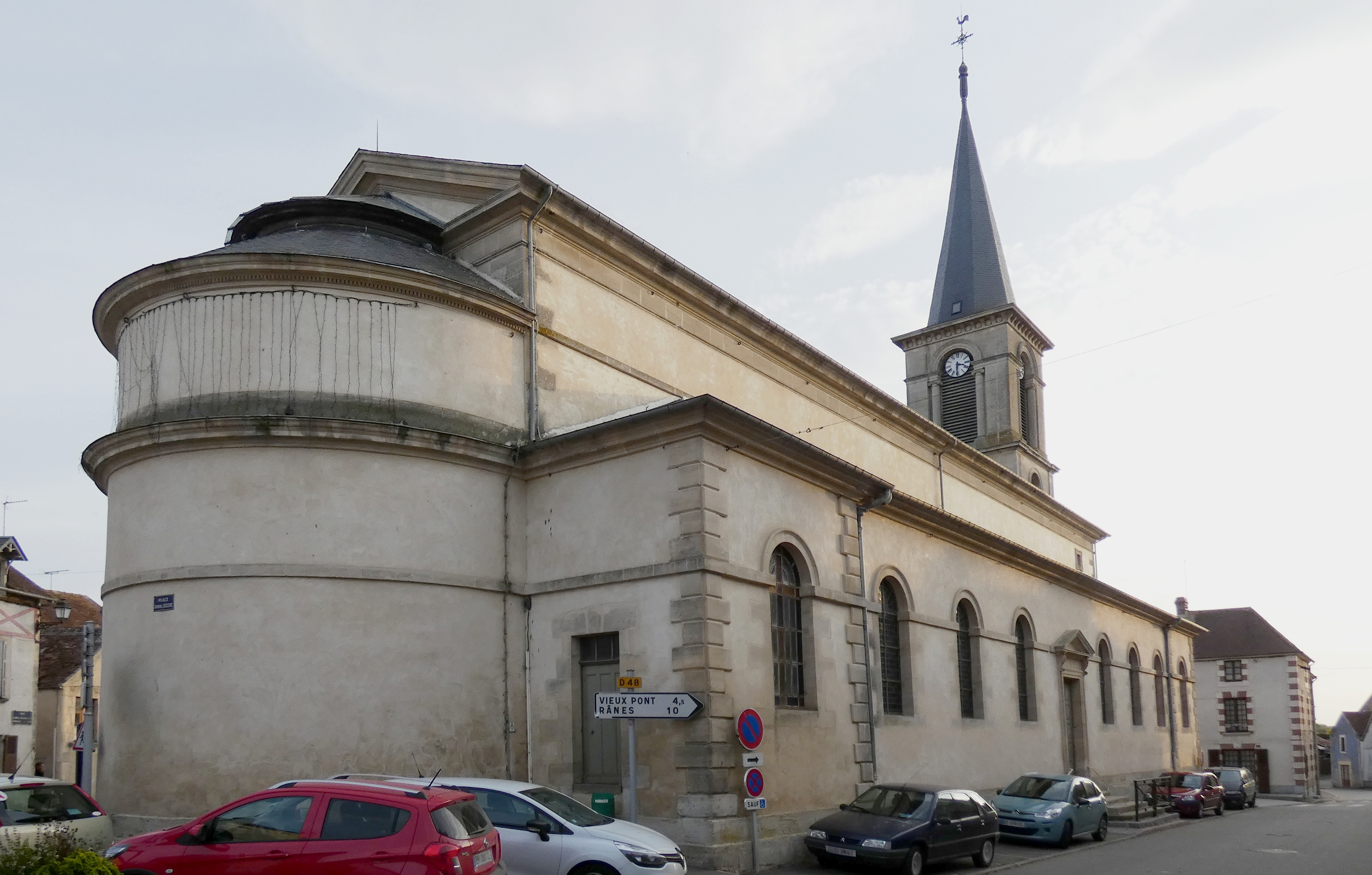
- Location of Boucé
- Location within France Location within Normandy
- Coordinates: 48°38′51″N 0°05′21″W
- Country: France
- Region: Normandy
- Department: Orne
- Arrondissement: Argentan
- Canton: Magny-le-Désert
- Intercommunality: Terres d'Argentan Interco

Government
  - Mayor (2020–2026): Brigitte Messager
- Area^{1}: 20.39 km^{2} (7.87 sq mi)
- Elevation: 191 m (627 ft)
- Highest elevation: 268 m (879 ft)
- Lowest elevation: 172 m (564 ft)
- Population (2023): 570
  - Density: 28/km^{2} (72/sq mi)
- Time zone: UTC+01:00 (CET)
  - Summer (DST): UTC+02:00 (CEST)
- INSEE/Postal code: 61055 /61570
- ^{1} French Land Register data, which excludes lakes, ponds, glaciers > 1 km^{2} (0.386 sq mi or 247 acres) and river estuaries.

Boucé (French pronunciation: [buse]) is a commune in the Orne department in northwestern France.

== Geography ==
The commune is made up of the following collection of villages and hamlets, Le Bellenger, Le Bois Pépin, La Pelletrie, La Farinière, Le Gassel, Le Cruchet and Boucé.

Parts of the commune make up the area, the Plaine d'Argentan, which is known for its cereal growing fields and horse stud farms.

It is 2,040 hectares (7.9 sq mi) in size. The highest point in the commune is 187 metres (614 ft).

Boucé along with another 65 communes shares part of a 20,593 hectare, Natura 2000 conservation area, called the Haute vallée de l'Orne et affluents. In addition along with another eight communes shares part of a 1,630 hectare, Natura 2000 conservation area, called Sites d'Ecouves.

Boucé has a total of five water courses running through it, the river Cance, Clairefontaine stream, Gue de la Heze stream, Moulin de Besnard stream and the Landelles stream.

== Population ==
Historical population
Year	Pop.	±% p.a.
1968	784	—
1975	700	−1.61%
1982	645	−1.16%
1990	630	−0.29%
1999	619	−0.20%
2007	586	−0.68%
2012	622	+1.20%
2017	615	−0.23%
2023	570	−1.26%
Source: INSEE

== Notable buildings and places ==
=== National heritage sites ===
Feudal mound a 10th or 12th century Motte, which was classified as a Monument historique in 1975.

== See also ==
- Communes of the Orne department
