= La Chapelle-près-Sées =

- Commune
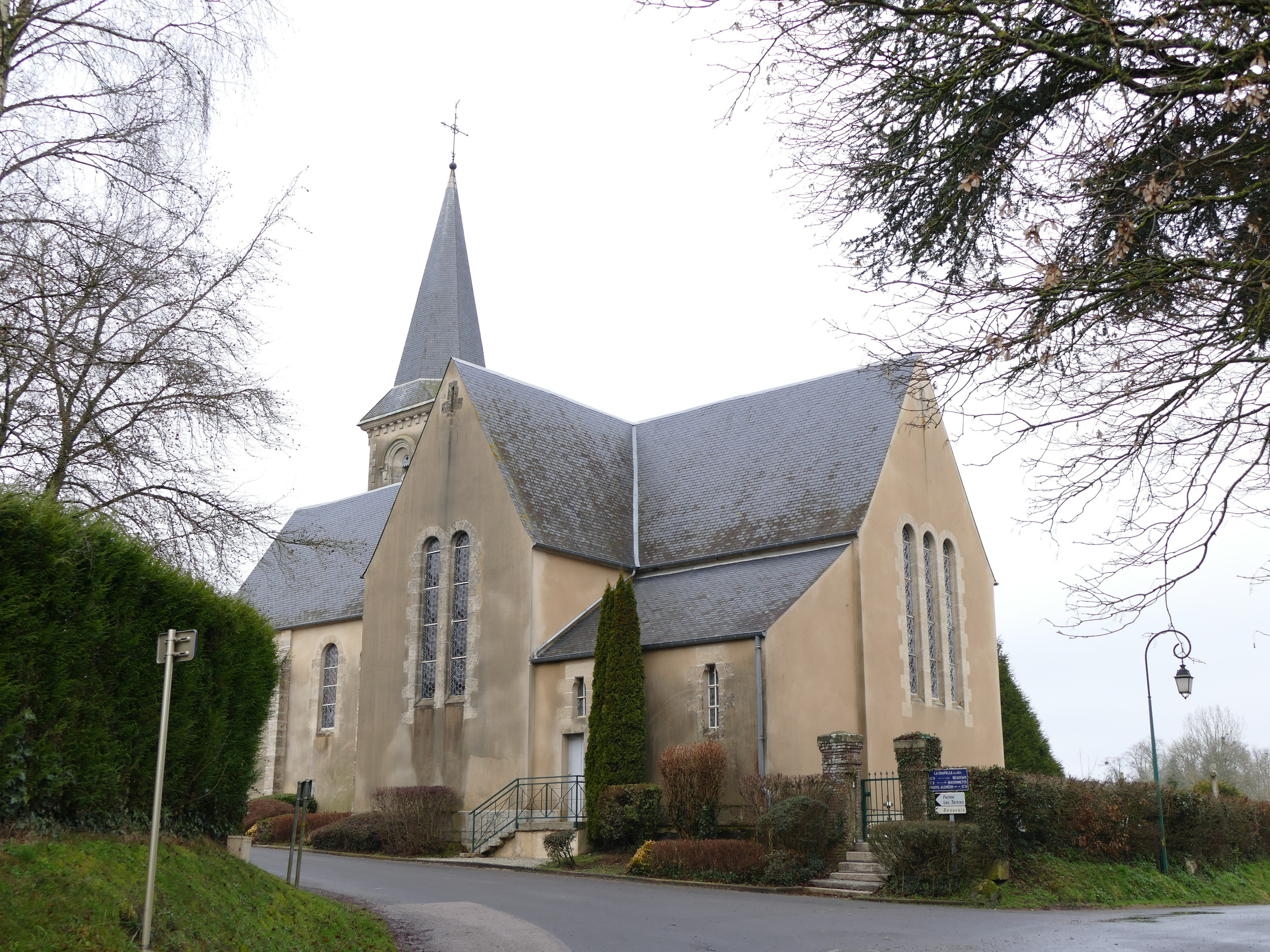
- The church in La Chapelle-près-Sées
- Location of La Chapelle-près-Sées
- Location within France Location within Normandy
- Coordinates: 48°34′17″N 0°09′45″E
- Country: France
- Region: Normandy
- Department: Orne
- Arrondissement: Alençon
- Canton: Sées
- Intercommunality: Sources de l'Orne

Government
  - Mayor (2024–2026): Jean-Michel Cuisinier
- Area^{1}: 9.95 km^{2} (3.84 sq mi)
- Elevation: 200 m (660 ft)
- Highest elevation: 260 m (850 ft)
- Lowest elevation: 168 m (551 ft)
- Population (2023): 492
  - Density: 49.4/km^{2} (128/sq mi)
- Time zone: UTC+01:00 (CET)
  - Summer (DST): UTC+02:00 (CEST)
- INSEE/Postal code: 61098 /61500
- ^{1} French Land Register data, which excludes lakes, ponds, glaciers > 1 km^{2} (0.386 sq mi or 247 acres) and river estuaries.

La Chapelle-près-Sées (French pronunciation: [la ʃapɛl pʁɛ se], literally La Chapelle near Sées) is a commune in the Orne department in north-western France.

== Geography ==
The commune is made up of the following collection of villages and hamlets, Le Clos Roulin, Beauvais and La Chapelle-près-Sées.

The commune is within the Normandie-Maine Regional Natural Park and Forêt d'Écouves.

La Chapelle-près-Sées along with another 65 communes is part of a 20,593 hectare, Natura 2000 conservation area, called the Haute vallée de l'Orne et affluents.

Ruisseau de la Lavandiere is the sole watercourse that flows through the commune.

== Points of Interest ==
=== National heritage sites ===
- Markers of Forêt d'Écouves a set of 80 markers positioned in the 18th century that mark the boundaries of the forest, they were registered as a Monument historique in 1987.

== See also ==
- Communes of the Orne department
- Parc naturel régional Normandie-Maine
