= Saint-Gervais-du-Perron =

- Commune
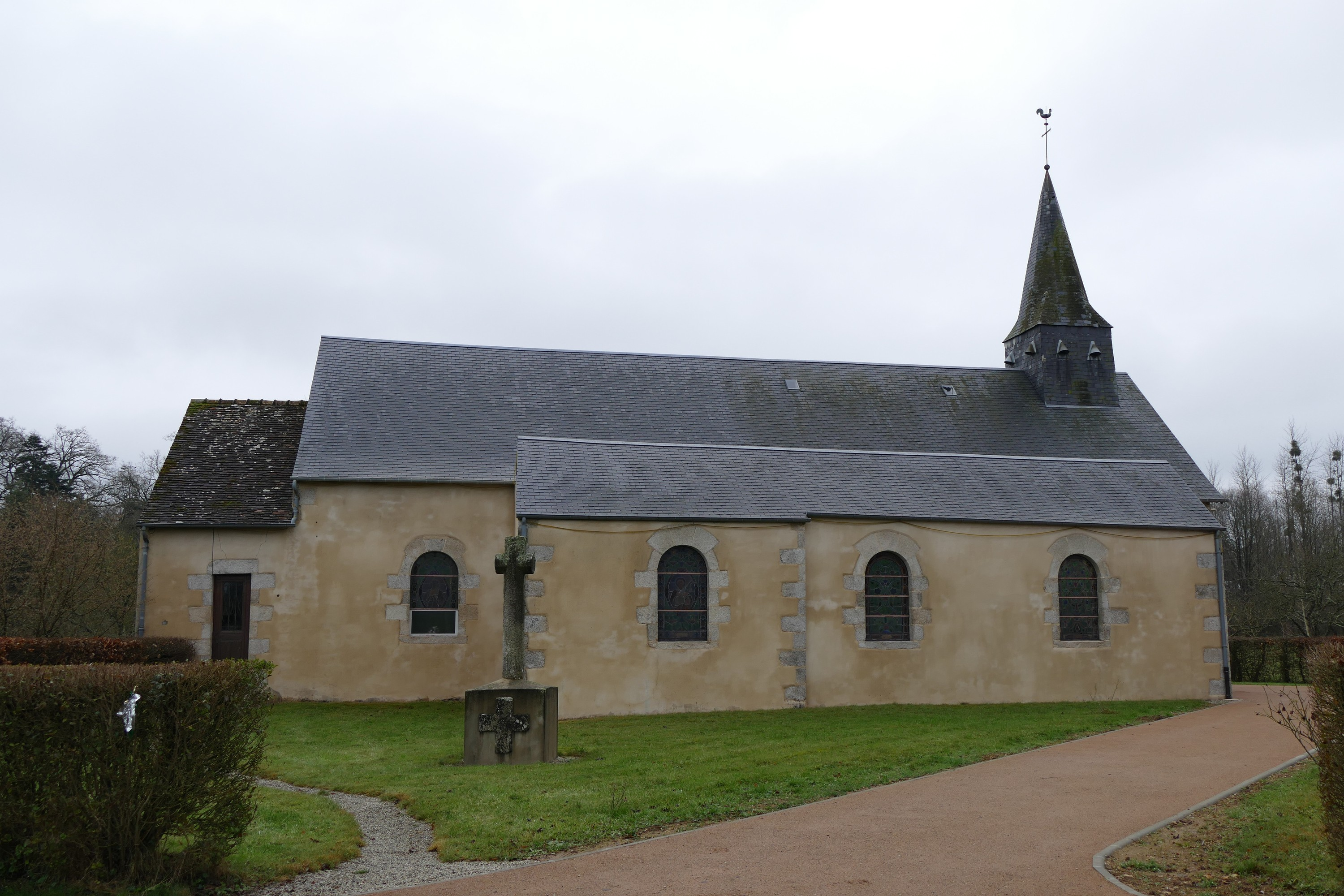
- The church in Saint-Gervais-du-Perron
- Location of Saint-Gervais-du-Perron
- Location within France Location within Normandy
- Coordinates: 48°32′09″N 0°08′55″E
- Country: France
- Region: Normandy
- Department: Orne
- Arrondissement: Alençon
- Canton: Sées

Government
  - Mayor (2020–2026): Damien Roger
- Area^{1}: 11.28 km^{2} (4.36 sq mi)
- Highest elevation: 333 m (1,093 ft)
- Lowest elevation: 151 m (495 ft)
- Population (2023): 341
  - Density: 30.2/km^{2} (78.3/sq mi)
- Time zone: UTC+01:00 (CET)
  - Summer (DST): UTC+02:00 (CEST)
- INSEE/Postal code: 61400 /61500
- ^{1} French Land Register data, which excludes lakes, ponds, glaciers > 1 km^{2} (0.386 sq mi or 247 acres) and river estuaries.

Saint-Gervais-du-Perron (French pronunciation: [sɛ̃ ʒɛʁvɛ dy pɛʁɔ̃]) is a commune in the Orne department in north-western France.

== Geography ==
The commune is made up of the following collection of villages and hamlets, Saint-Gervais-du-Perron, La Guélandière, La Truelle, Le Perron and Saint-Laurent de Beauménil.

The commune is within the Normandie-Maine Regional Natural Park and Forêt d'Écouves.

== Notable buildings and places ==
=== National heritage sites ===
- Markers of Forêt d'Écouves a set of 80 markers positioned in the 18th century that mark the boundaries of the forest, they were registered as a Monument historique in 1987.

== Notable people ==
- Pierre Cardin (1922–2020), an Italian-born naturalised-French fashion designer, lived here between 1960 and 1972 at Beaumesnil manor.

== See also ==
- Communes of the Orne department
- Parc naturel régional Normandie-Maine
