= La Lande-de-Goult =

- Commune
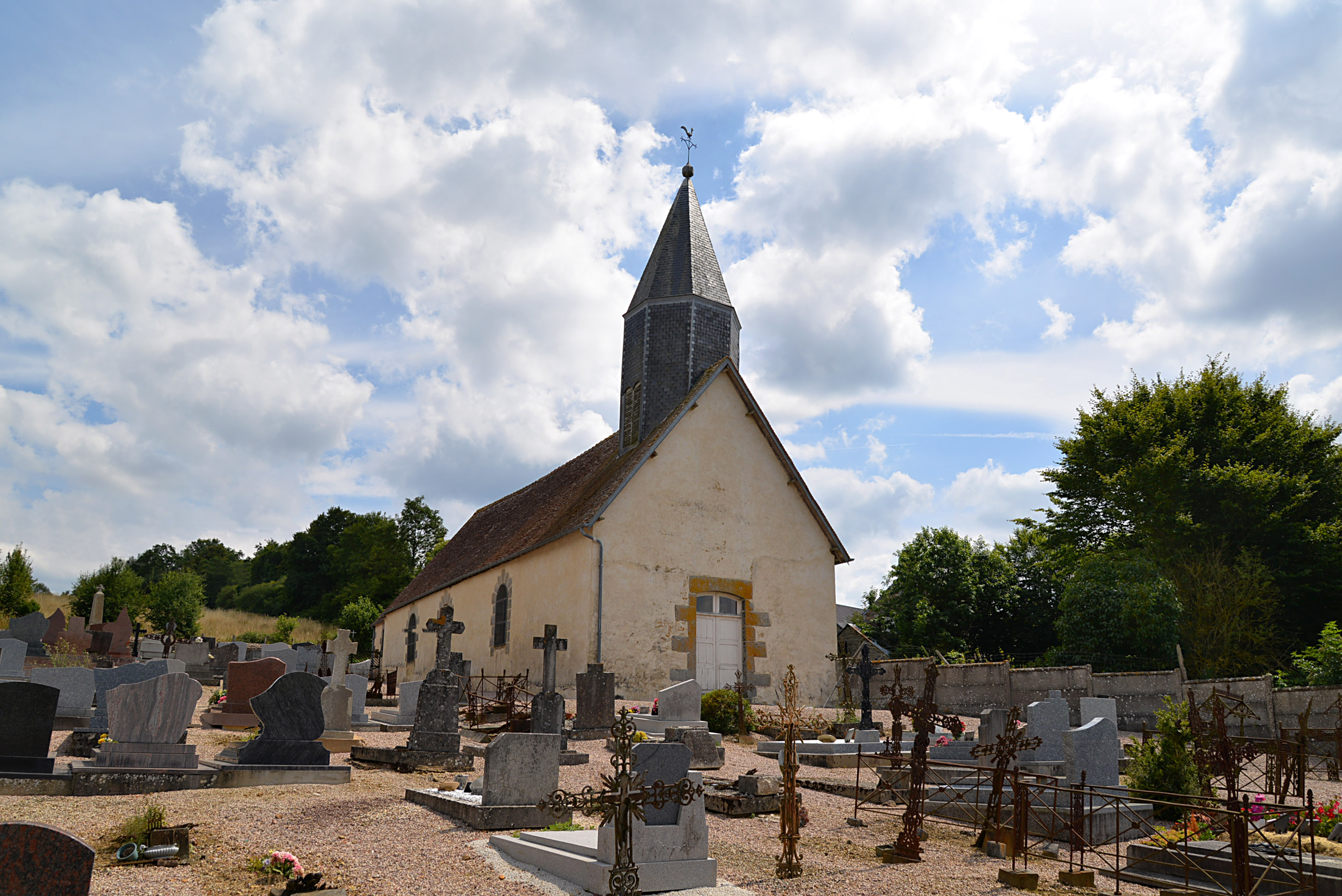
- The church in La Lande-de-Goult
- Location of La Lande-de-Goult
- Location within France Location within Normandy
- Coordinates: 48°35′09″N 0°02′46″W
- Country: France
- Region: Normandy
- Department: Orne
- Arrondissement: Alençon
- Canton: Magny-le-Désert
- Intercommunality: Pays fertois et Bocage carrougien

Government
  - Mayor (2020–2026): Jean-Marc Bisson
- Area^{1}: 28.57 km^{2} (11.03 sq mi)
- Elevation: 302 m (991 ft)
- Highest elevation: 413 m (1,355 ft)
- Lowest elevation: 217 m (712 ft)
- Population (2023): 182
  - Density: 6.37/km^{2} (16.5/sq mi)
- Time zone: UTC+01:00 (CET)
  - Summer (DST): UTC+02:00 (CEST)
- INSEE/Postal code: 61216 /61320
- ^{1} French Land Register data, which excludes lakes, ponds, glaciers > 1 km^{2} (0.386 sq mi or 247 acres) and river estuaries.

La Lande-de-Goult (French pronunciation: [la lɑ̃d də ɡu]) is a commune in the Orne department in north-western France.

== Geography ==
The commune is made up of the following collection of villages and hamlets, Goult, La Forêt, Le Tertre, Le Flochet and La Lande-de-Goult.

It is 2,860 hectares (11.0 sq mi) in size. The highest point in the commune is 293 metres (961 ft).

The commune is within the Normandie-Maine Regional Natural Park and Forêt d'Écouves.

La Lande-de-Goult along with another 65 communes shares part of a 20,593 hectare, Natura 2000 conservation area, called the Haute vallée de l'Orne et affluents. In addition the commune along with another eight communes shares part of a 1,630 hectare, Natura 2000 conservation area, called Sites d'Ecouves.

The commune has five watercourses flowing through it, La Cance river, Clairefontaine stream, Coupigny stream, Landelles stream and the Blanchelande stream.

== Notable buildings and places ==
- Tourbière des Petits Riaux a nature reserve consisting of a peat bog with carnivorous plants.

=== National heritage sites ===
The Commune has three buildings and areas listed as a Monument historique.

- Markers of Forêt d'Écouves a set of 80 markers positioned in the 18th century that mark the boundaries of the forest, they were registered as a Monument historique in 1987.
- Remains of the ancient camp of Goult - A Protohistoric site that was listed as a monument in 1963.
- Goult Priory - A 12th century priory that was listed as a monument in 1989.

== See also ==
- Communes of the Orne department
- Parc naturel régional Normandie-Maine
