= Saint-Marc-la-Lande =

- Commune
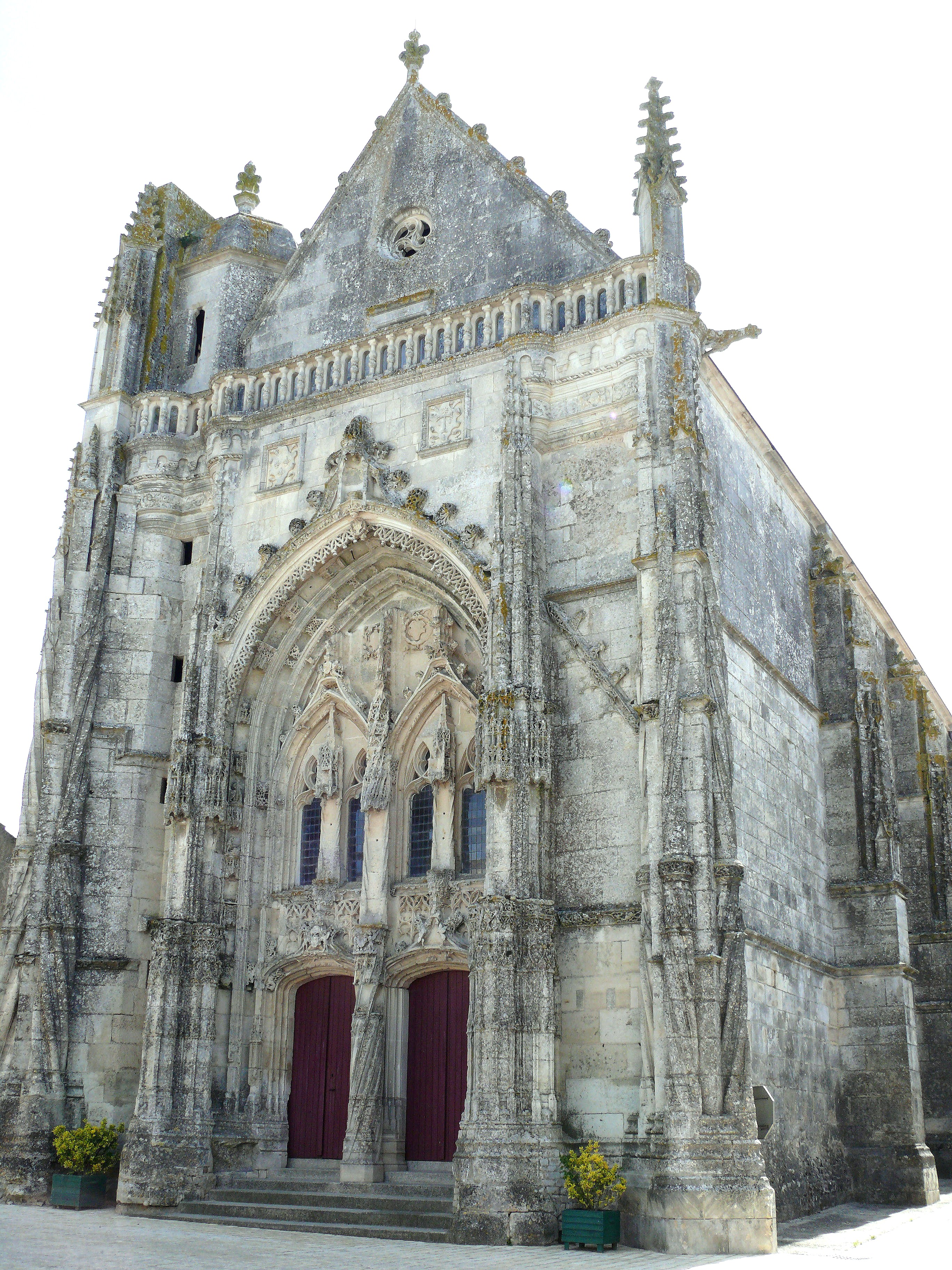
- The church in Saint-Marc-la-Lande
- Location of Saint-Marc-la-Lande
- Location within France Location within Nouvelle-Aquitaine
- Coordinates: 46°31′15″N 0°22′41″W
- Country: France
- Region: Nouvelle-Aquitaine
- Department: Deux-Sèvres
- Arrondissement: Parthenay
- Canton: La Gâtine

Government
  - Mayor (2020–2026): Pascal Olivier
- Area^{1}: 10.22 km^{2} (3.95 sq mi)
- Elevation: 170 m (560 ft)
- Highest elevation: 217 m (712 ft)
- Lowest elevation: 120 m (390 ft)
- Population (2023): 356
  - Density: 34.8/km^{2} (90.2/sq mi)
- Time zone: UTC+01:00 (CET)
  - Summer (DST): UTC+02:00 (CEST)
- INSEE/Postal code: 79271 /79310
- ^{1} French Land Register data, which excludes lakes, ponds, glaciers > 1 km^{2} (0.386 sq mi or 247 acres) and river estuaries.

Saint-Marc-la-Lande (French pronunciation: [sɛ̃ maʁ la lɑ̃d]) is a commune in the Deux-Sèvres department in western France.

== See also ==
- Communes of the Deux-Sèvres department
