= Boissei-la-Lande =

- Commune
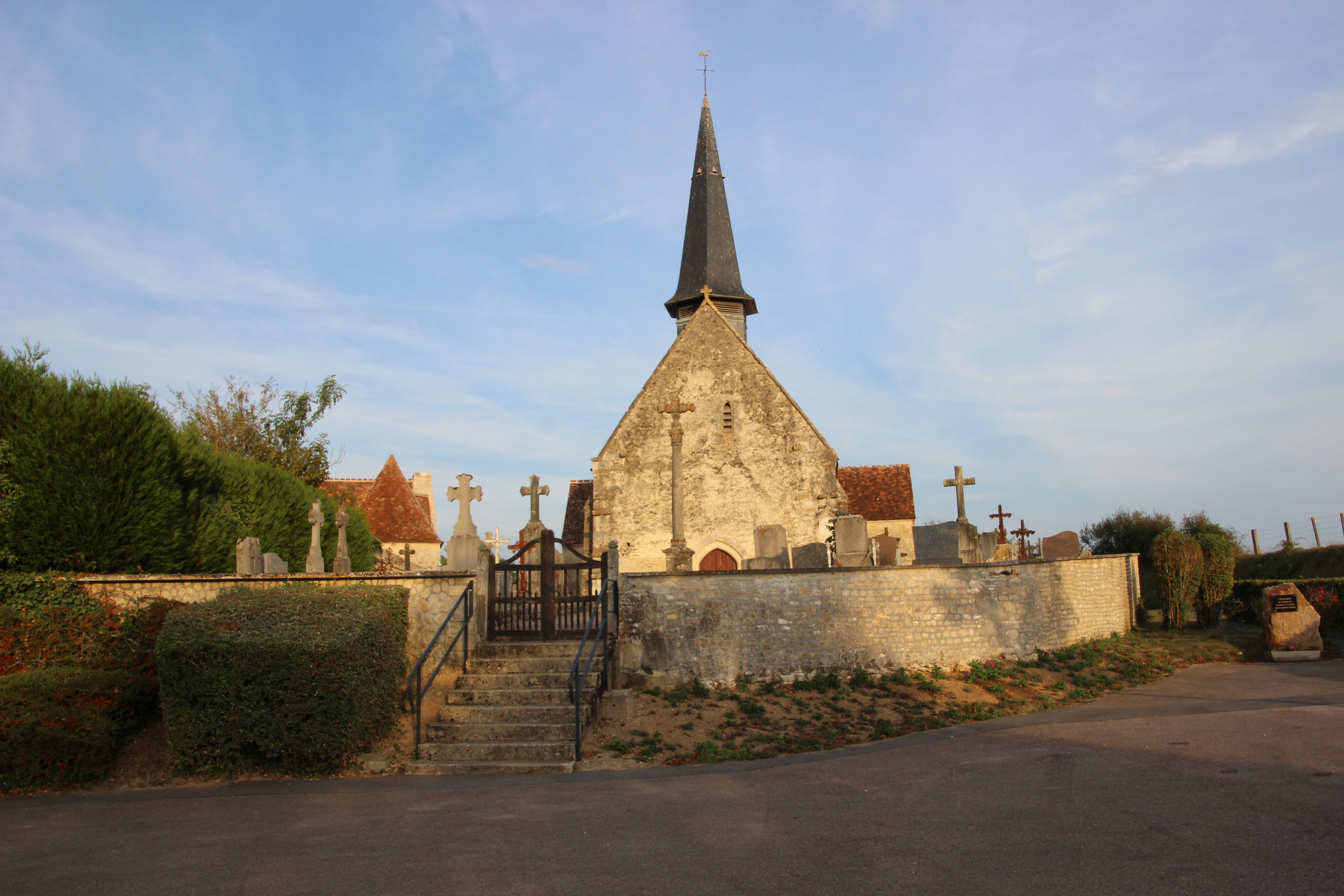
- Location of Boissei-la-Lande
- Location within France Location within Normandy
- Coordinates: 48°41′01″N 0°03′47″E
- Country: France
- Region: Normandy
- Department: Orne
- Arrondissement: Alençon
- Canton: Sées

Government
  - Mayor (2020–2026): Yves Grasland
- Area^{1}: 7.11 km^{2} (2.75 sq mi)
- Elevation: 166 m (545 ft)
- Highest elevation: 193 m (633 ft)
- Lowest elevation: 159 m (522 ft)
- Population (2023): 108
  - Density: 15.2/km^{2} (39.3/sq mi)
- Time zone: UTC+01:00 (CET)
  - Summer (DST): UTC+02:00 (CEST)
- INSEE/Postal code: 61049 /61570
- ^{1} French Land Register data, which excludes lakes, ponds, glaciers > 1 km^{2} (0.386 sq mi or 247 acres) and river estuaries.

Boissei-la-Lande (French pronunciation: [bwasɛ la lɑ̃d]) is a commune in the Orne department in northwestern France.

== Geography ==
The commune is made up of the following collection of villages and hamlets, Le Friche du Val,Thion, Le Theil, La Rivière,Pillou,La Hauteville and Boissei-la-Lande.

Boissei-la-Lande along with another 65 communes is part of a 20,593 hectare, Natura 2000 conservation area, called the Haute vallée de l'Orne et affluents.

In addition to the river Orne, the commune also has three streams running through it, the Calvaire, L'Epinet and La Gironde.

== Population ==
Historical population
Year	Pop.	±% p.a.
1968	113	—
1975	103	−1.31%
1982	115	+1.59%
1990	104	−1.25%
1999	115	+1.12%
2007	121	+0.64%
2012	107	−2.43%
2017	124	+2.99%
2023	108	−2.28%
Source: INSEE

== Notable buildings and places ==
=== National heritage sites ===
The Commune has 2 buildings and areas listed as a Monument historique.

- Church Farm a 16th-century farmhouse listed as a monument in 1986.
- Church of Boissei-la-Lande a 16th-century church listed as a monument in 1986.
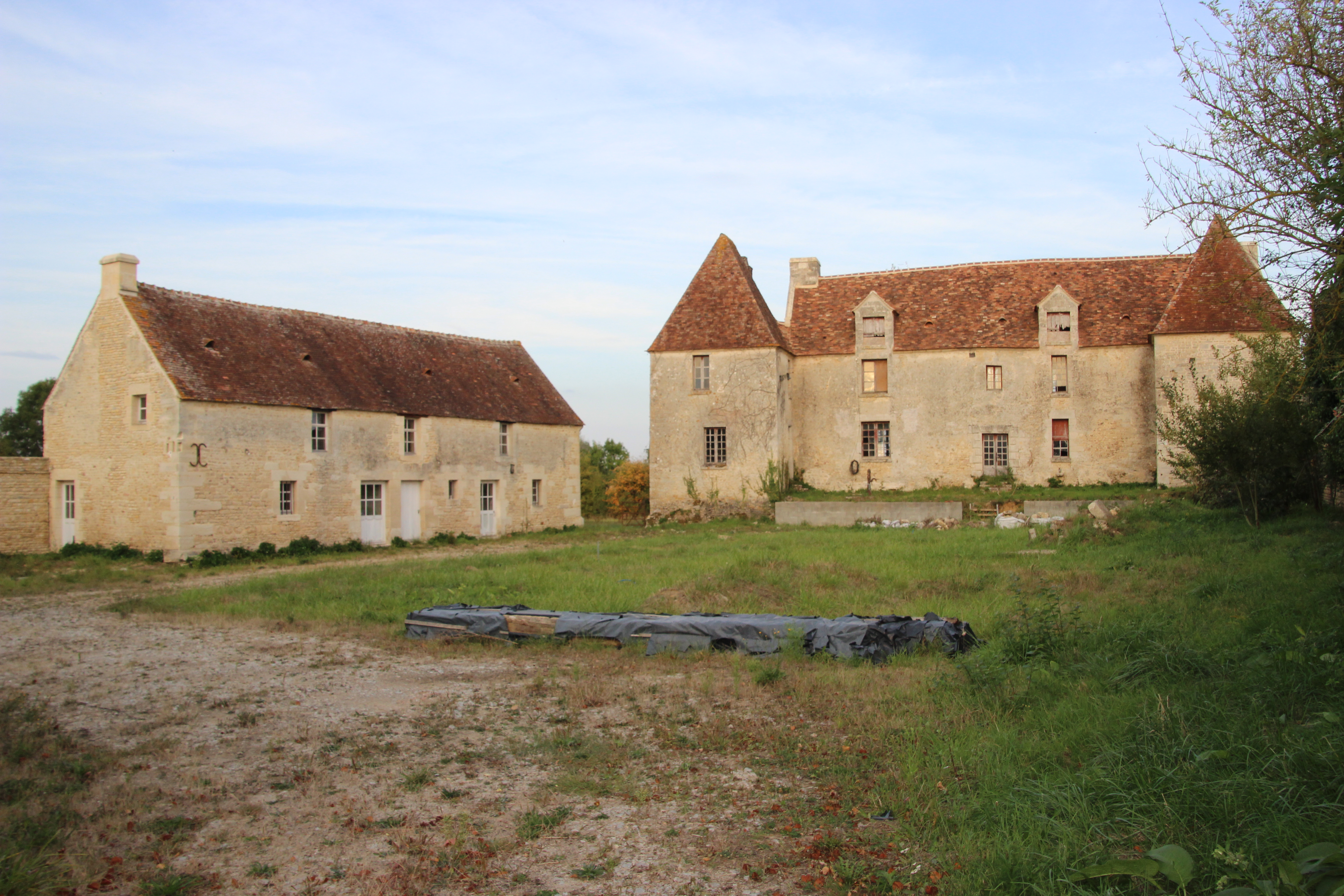
Boissei-la-Lande - Church farm

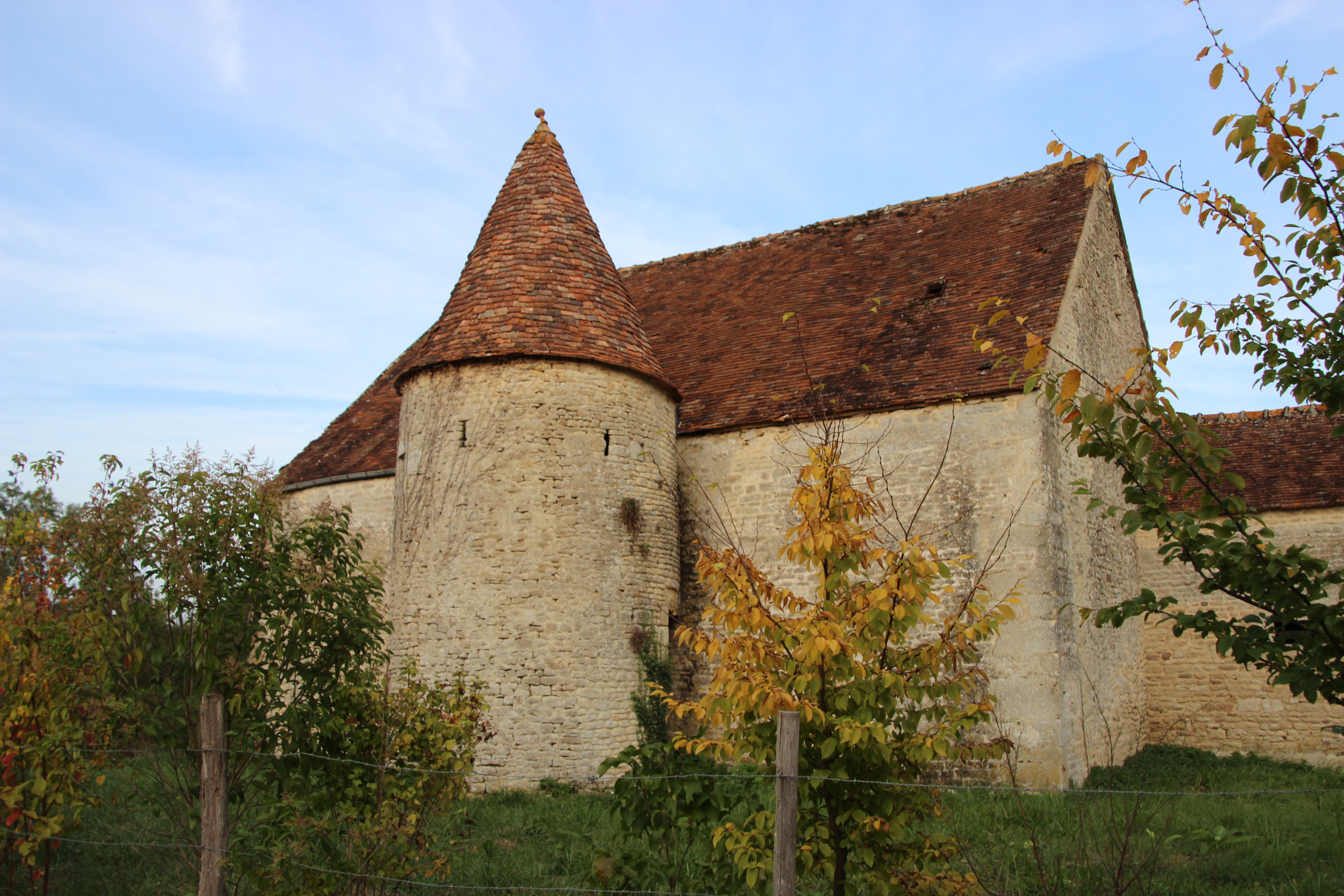
Boissei-la-Lande church farm

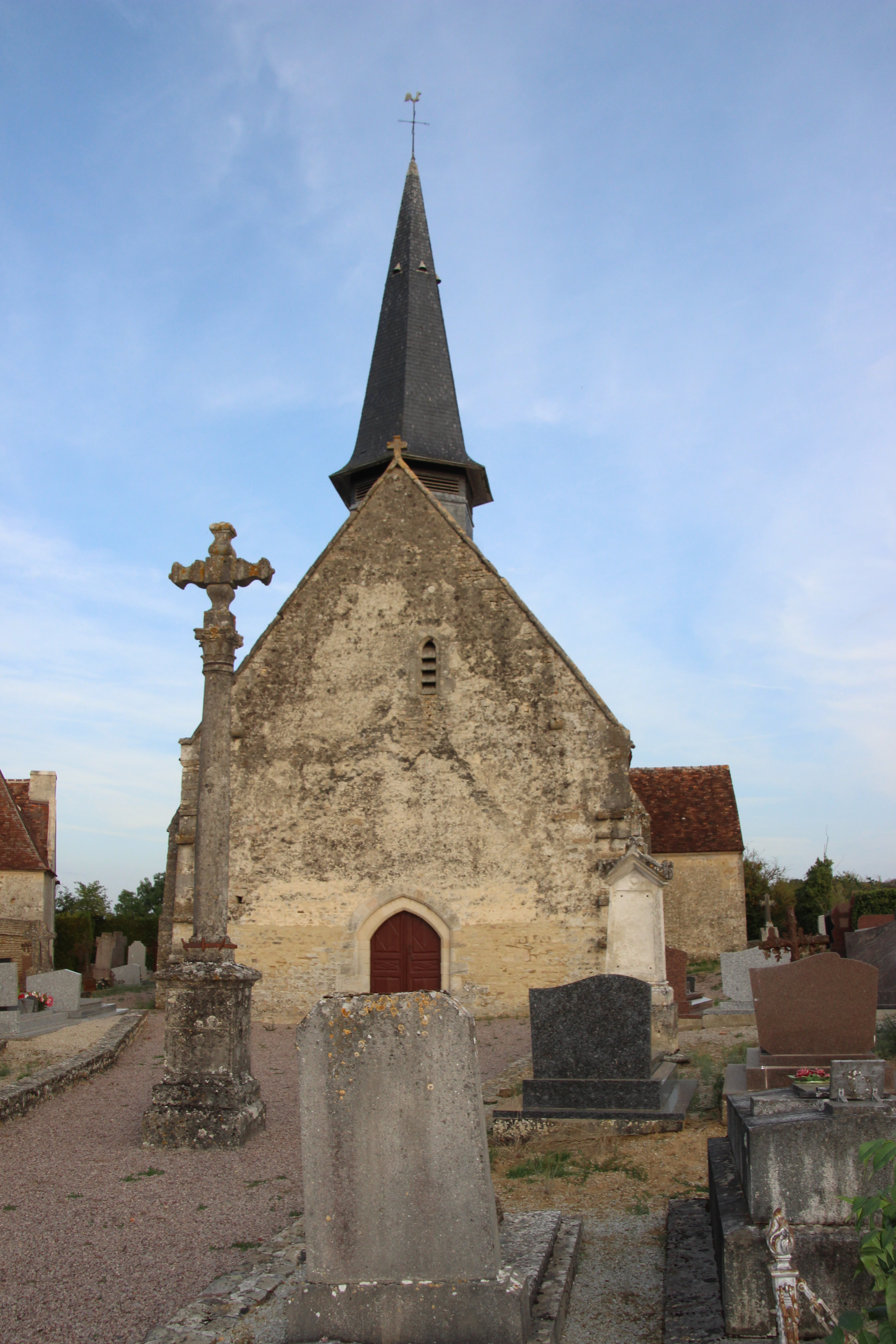
Boissei-la-Lande church

== See also ==
- Communes of the Orne department
