= Saint-Jean-de-la-Lande, Chaudière-Appalaches, Quebec =

Coordinates: 46°2′37″N 70°42′36″W

Saint-Jean-de-la-Lande (French pronunciation: [sɛ̃ ʒɑ̃ də la lɑ̃d]) was a former parish municipality. On September 26, 2001, it merged into the city of Saint-Georges, Quebec and became a district of that city.
