= La Bellière, Orne =

La Bellière
- Commune
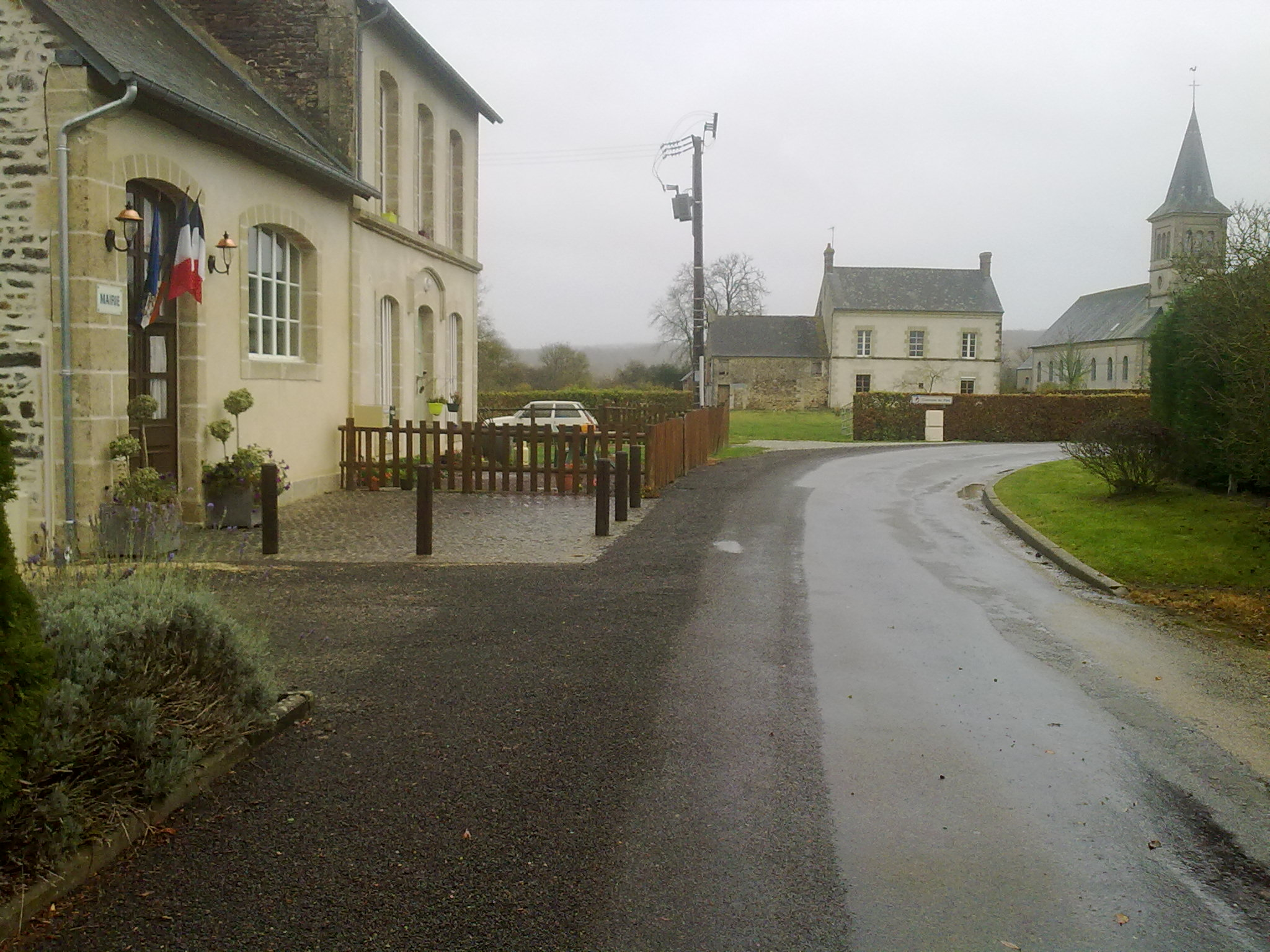
- The town hall and church in La Bellière
- Location of La Bellière
- Location within France Location within Normandy
- Coordinates: 48°37′36″N 0°01′59″W
- Country: France
- Region: Normandy
- Department: Orne
- Arrondissement: Alençon
- Canton: Sées
- Intercommunality: Sources de l'Orne

Government
  - Mayor (2020–2026): Eric Renouard
- Area^{1}: 13.91 km^{2} (5.37 sq mi)
- Elevation: 215 m (705 ft)
- Highest elevation: 363 m (1,191 ft)
- Lowest elevation: 192 m (630 ft)
- Population (2023): 125
  - Density: 8.99/km^{2} (23.3/sq mi)
- Time zone: UTC+01:00 (CET)
  - Summer (DST): UTC+02:00 (CEST)
- INSEE/Postal code: 61039 /61570
- ^{1} French Land Register data, which excludes lakes, ponds, glaciers > 1 km^{2} (0.386 sq mi or 247 acres) and river estuaries.

La Bellière (French pronunciation: [la bɛljɛʁ]) is a commune in the Orne department in northwestern France.

== Geography ==
The commune is made up of the following collection of villages and hamlets, Le Grais, La Haute Bellière, La Rochette and La Bellière.

It is 1,390 hectares (5.4 sq mi) in size. The highest point in the commune is 215 metres (705 ft).

The commune is within the Normandie-Maine Regional Natural Park and Forêt d'Écouves.

The commune along with another eight communes shares part of a 1,630 hectare, Natura 2000 conservation area, called Sites d'Ecouves.

La Bellière has a total of five streams running through it, the Aprel, the Cercueil, the Clairefontaine, the Landrion and the Vallees.

== Population ==
Historical population

Year	Pop.	±% p.a.
1793	498	—
1821	515	+0.12%
1846	538	+0.17%
1872	462	−0.58%
1901	303	−1.44%
1926	201	−1.63%
1946	231	+0.70%
1962	167	−2.01%
1968	153	−1.45%

Year	Pop.	±% p.a.
1975	128	−2.52%
1982	116	−1.40%
1990	101	−1.72%
1999	103	+0.22%
2007	108	+0.59%
2012	117	+1.61%
2017	125	+1.33%
2023	125	+0.00%

Source: EHESS and INSEE (1968-2023)

== See also ==
- Communes of the Orne department
- Parc naturel régional Normandie-Maine
