= Vrigny, Orne =

Vrigny
- Part of Boischampré
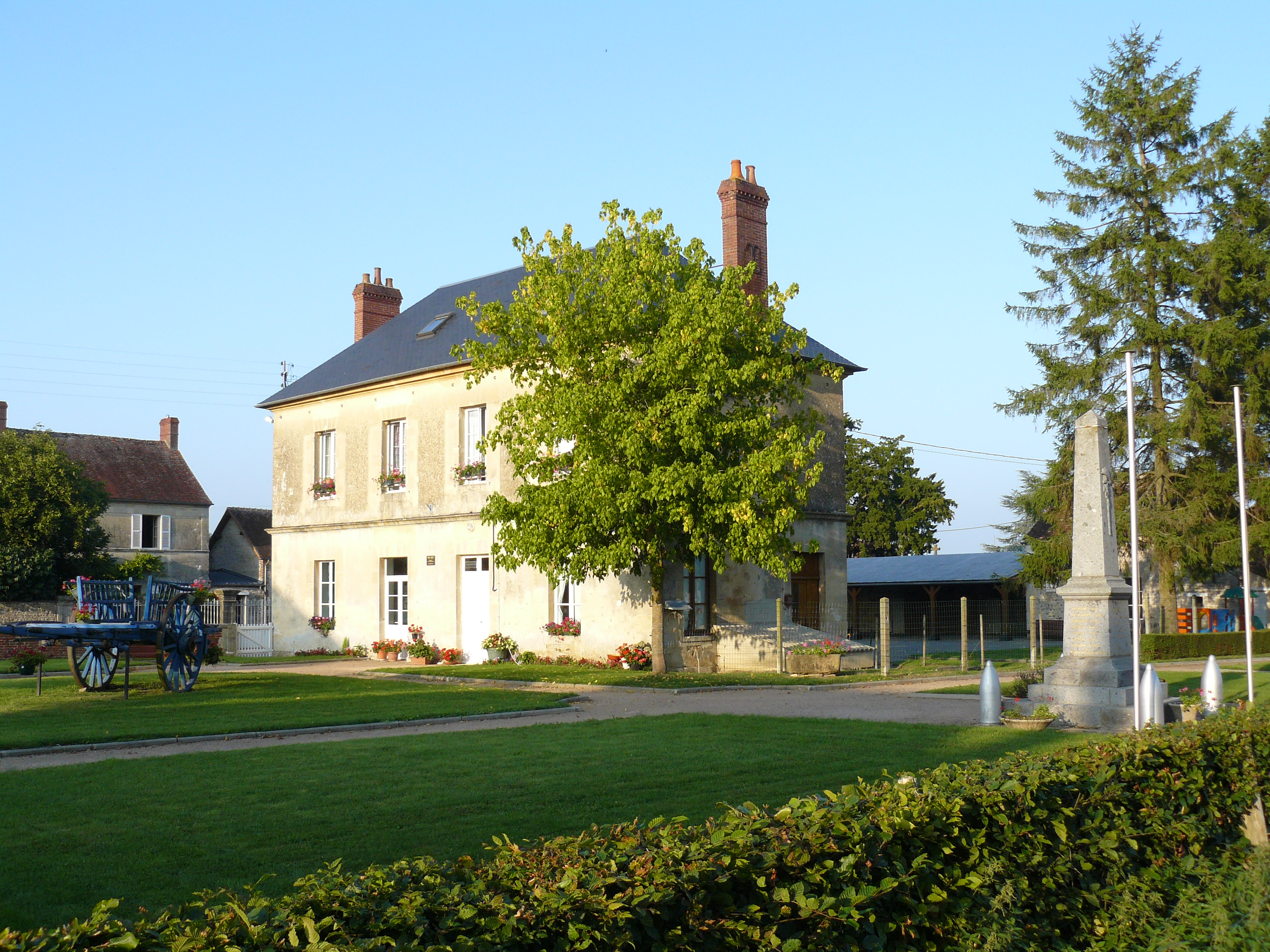
- Vrigny primary school and war memorial
- Location of Vrigny
- Location within France Location within Normandy
- Coordinates: 48°40′20″N 0°01′09″W
- Country: France
- Region: Normandy
- Department: Orne
- Arrondissement: Argentan
- Canton: Argentan-1
- Commune: Boischampré
- Area^{1}: 13.45 km^{2} (5.19 sq mi)
- Elevation: 273 m (896 ft)
- Highest elevation: 268 m (879 ft)
- Lowest elevation: 157 m (515 ft)
- Population (2022): 369
  - Density: 27.4/km^{2} (71.1/sq mi)
- Demonym: Vrignois
- Time zone: UTC+01:00 (CET)
  - Summer (DST): UTC+02:00 (CEST)
- Postal code: 61570
- ^{1} French Land Register data, which excludes lakes, ponds, glaciers > 1 km^{2} (0.386 sq mi or 247 acres) and river estuaries.

Vrigny (French pronunciation: [vʁiɲi]) is a former commune in the Orne department in north-western France. In 2015 it became part of Boischampré.

== See also ==
- Communes of the Orne department
- Parc naturel régional Normandie-Maine
