= Neauphe-sous-Essai =

- Commune
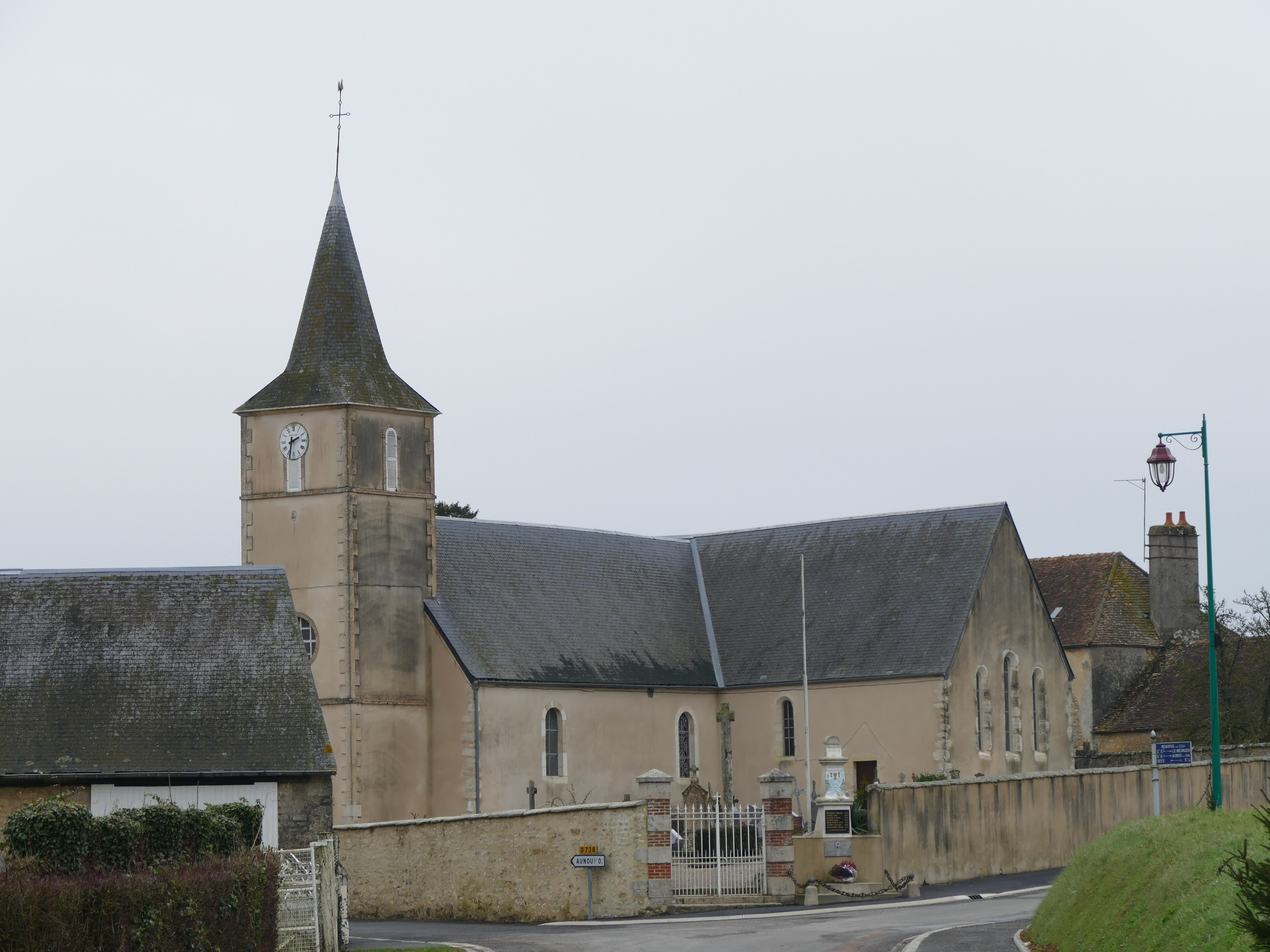
- The church in Neauphe-sous-Essai
- Location of Neauphe-sous-Essai
- Location within France Location within Normandy
- Coordinates: 48°33′59″N 0°12′41″E
- Country: France
- Region: Normandy
- Department: Orne
- Arrondissement: Alençon
- Canton: Sées
- Intercommunality: Sources de l'Orne

Government
  - Mayor (2020–2026): Patrick Lambert
- Area^{1}: 11.43 km^{2} (4.41 sq mi)
- Elevation: 204 m (669 ft)
- Highest elevation: 214 m (702 ft)
- Lowest elevation: 167 m (548 ft)
- Population (2023): 210
  - Density: 18/km^{2} (48/sq mi)
- Demonym: Néalphins
- Time zone: UTC+01:00 (CET)
  - Summer (DST): UTC+02:00 (CEST)
- INSEE/Postal code: 61301 /61500
- ^{1} French Land Register data, which excludes lakes, ponds, glaciers > 1 km^{2} (0.386 sq mi or 247 acres) and river estuaries.

Neauphe-sous-Essai (French pronunciation: [nof su.z‿ɛsɛ], literally Neauphe under Essai) is a commune in the Orne department in north-western France.

== Geography ==
The commune is made up of the following collection of villages and hamlets, Le Meurger, La Ferronnière, Neauphe-sous-Essai and Les Trois Cornes.

The commune is within the Normandie-Maine Regional Natural Park and Forêt d'Écouves.

== See also ==
- Communes of the Orne department
