= List of Latin names for cities or towns in Continental Europe, Ireland and Scandinavia =

This list includes European cities or towns that were part of the Roman Empire, or that were given Latin place names in historical references. As a large portion of the latter were only created during the Middle Ages, often based on scholarly etiology, this is not to be confused with a list of the actual names the settlements bore during the classical era.

== Background ==
Until the Modern Era, Latin was the common language for scholarship and mapmaking. During the 19th and 20th centuries, German scholars in particular have made significant contributions to the study of historical place names, or Ortsnamenkunde. These studies have, in turn, contributed to the study of genealogy. For genealogists and historians of pre-Modern Europe, knowing alternate names of places is vital to extracting information from both public and private records. Even specialists in this field point out, however, that the information can be easily taken out of context, since there is a great deal of repetition of place names throughout Europe; reliance purely on apparent connections should therefore be tempered with valid historical methodology.

== Caveats and notes ==
Latin place names are not always exclusive to one place — for example, there were several Roman cities whose names began with Colonia and then a more descriptive term. During the Middle Ages, these were often shortened to just Colonia. One of these, Colonia Agrippinensis, retains the name today in the form of Cologne.

Early sources for Roman names show numerous variants and spellings of the Latin names.

The modern canonical name is listed first. Sources are listed chronologically. In general, only the earliest source is shown for each name, although many of the names are recorded in more than one of the sources. Where the source differs in spelling, or has other alternatives, these are listed following the source. As an aid to searching, variants are spelled completely, and listed in most likely chronology.

Superscripts indicate:

1. Latinized form of the Greek-derived name.
2. Latinized form of the Asian-derived name via Greek.
3. Altered Latinized form of the Greek-derived name.

== Cities and towns in Austria ==
Canonical Latin name (source(s): variant(s))	English name (native language(s)) – older name(s), (other language(s)), location(s)
Brigantium, Brigantia	Bregenz
Carnuntum	Bad Deutsch-Altenburg / Petronell
Chremisa	Krems
Idunum	Judenburg
Iuenna	Jaunstein – (Podjuna), Völkermarkt
Iuvavum, Iuvavia, Salisburgum	Salzburg
Lentia	Linz
Noreia	Neumarkt in der Steiermark
Oenipons	Innsbruck
Ovilava	Wels
Veldidena	Wilten
Vindóbona, Vienna (Austriae)	Vienna (Wien)
Virunum, Maria in Solio	Maria Saal – (Gospa Sveta)

== Cities and towns in Belgium ==
Canonical Latin name (source(s): variant(s))	English name (native language(s)) – older name(s), (other language(s)), location(s)
Aldenarda	Oudenaarde (nl), Audenarde (fr)
Alliacum	Alken
Alostum	Aalst (nl), Alost (fr)
Andagium	Saint-Hubert
Anderlacum	Anderlecht
Anglomonasterium	Ingelmunster
Antonium	Antoing
Antverpia	Antwerp, Antwerpen (nl), Anvers (fr)
Aquae Luvienses Tungrorum	Spa
Arschotium	Aarschot
Athum	Ath (fr), Aat (nl)
Atuatuca Tungrorum	Tongeren (nl), Tongres (fr)
Atuatuca Tungrorum et Borchlonium	Tongeren-Borgloon (nl), Tongres-Looz (fr)
Audergemium	Auderghem (fr), Oudergem (nl)
Balliolum	Belœil
Bastonacum	Bastogne (fr), Bastenaken (nl)
Bellomontium	Beaumont
Binchium	Binche
Borchlonium	Borgloon (nl), Looz (fr)
Bruga	Bruges (fr), Brugge (nl)
Brosella	Brussels, Brussel (nl), Bruxelles (fr)
Bullionium	Bouillon
Bussutum	Boussu
Camasiacum	Kemzeke
Caroloregium	Charleroi
Cassiniacum	Kessenich
Castellarium	Châtelet
Castrum	Kaster
Chiniacum	Chiny
Cimaium	Chimay
Comineum	Comines (fr), Komen (nl)
Comitiacum	Kumtich
Condacum	Kontich
Couvinum	Couvin
Cortoriacum, Cortracum	Kortrijk (nl), Courtrai (fr)
Dalemum	Dalhem
Damma, Dammum	Damme (nl)
Dionantum	Dinant
Durbetum	Durbuy
Durnum	Dour
Felsecum	Velzeke
Forestum	Forest (fr), Vorst (nl)
Furna	Veurne (nl)
Gandavum	Ghent, Gent (nl), Gand (fr)
Gaudiacum	Gooik
Geldoniacum, Geldonia	Jodoigne (fr), Geldenaken (nl)
Gemblacum	Gembloux (fr), Gembloers (nl)
Gerardimontium	Geraardsbergen (nl), Grammont (fr)
Halenium	Halen
Hanutum	Hannut (fr), Hannuit (nl)
Hasseletum	Hasselt
Helissemium	Hélécine
Heristalium	Herstal
Hoium	Huy (fr), Hoei (nl)
Hulpenum	La Hulpe (fr), Terhulpen (nl)
Lendium	Lens
Leodium	Liège (fr), Luik (nl), Lüttich (de)
Liniacum	Lennik
Limburgum	Limbourg (fr), Limburg (nl)
Lovanium	Leuven (nl), Louvain (fr)
Malmunderium	Malmedy
Montiniacum	Montenaken
Namurcum	Namur (fr), Namen (nl)
Novum Castrum	Neufchâteau
Novum Lovanium	Louvain-la-Neuve
Novus Portus	Nieuwpoort (nl), Nieuport (fr)
Orolaunum	Arlon (fr), Aarlen (nl)
Ottiniacum	Ottignies
Rodium	Le Rœulx
Rothnacum	Ronse (nl), Renaix (fr)
Seranium	Seraing
Setiliacum	Zellik
Sichemium	Zichem
Stockhemium	Stokkem
Sunniacum	Soignies (fr), Zinnik (nl)
Tamasiacum, Tamisiacum, Temsica	Temse (nl), Tamise (fr)
Teneramonda	Dendermonde (nl)
Tiletum	Tielt
Tiliacum	Tilly
Tornacum Nerviorum	Tournai (fr), Doornik (nl)
Tudinum	Thuin
Turnholtum	Turnhout
Varnetonium	Warneton (fr), Waasten (nl)
Villariacum	Wilrijk
Viroviacum	Wervik (nl), Wervicq (fr)
Visetum	Visé (fr), Wezet (nl)
Vodgoriacum	Waudrez
Waterloum	Waterloo
Zuindracum	Zwijndrecht

== Cities and towns in the Czech Republic ==
Canonical Latin name (source(s): variant(s))	English name (native language(s)) – older name(s), (other language(s)), location(s)
Alta Muta	Vysoké Mýto
Beneschovium	Benešov
Broda Bohemica	Český Brod
Brunna	Brno
Budovisium	České Budějovice
Carnovia	Krnov
Colonia	Kolín
Eburum, Olomutium, Olomucium	Olomouc
Luna	Louny
Nova domus	Jindřichův Hradec
Oppavia	Opava
Ostravia	Ostrava
Pilsenum, Pilsna	Plzeň
Praga	Prague (Praha)
Racona	Rakovník
Vallis Gaudiorum	Bruntál
Verona	Beroun
Znoimium	Znojmo

== Cities and towns in Denmark ==
Canonical Latin name (source(s): variant(s))	English name (native language(s)) – older name(s), (other language(s)), location(s)
Arus, Arhus	Århus
Fredericia	Fredericia
Hafnia	Copenhagen (København)
Othonia	Odense
Sora	Sorø
Wellea	Vejle
Wibergis	Viborg

== Cities and towns in Estonia ==
Canonical Latin name (source(s): variant(s))	English name (native language(s)) – older name(s), (other language(s)), location(s)
Arx Aquilae	Kuressaare
Pernavia, (Nova) Perona	Pärnu
Revalia	Tallinn
Tarbatum, Tharbata	Tartu

== Cities and towns in Finland ==
Canonical Latin name (source(s): variant(s))	English name (native language(s)) – older name(s), (other language(s)), location(s)
Aboa	Turku – (Åbo)
Arctopolis	Pori – (Björneborg)
Arx Savonum	Savonlinna – (Nyslott)
Arx Tavastiae, Tavasteburgum	Hämeenlinna – (Tavastehus)
Borgoa	Porvoo – (Borgå)
Brahestadium	Raahe – (Brahestad)
Cajaneburgum	Kajaani – (Kajana)
Carolina Vetus	Kokkola – (Karleby, Gamlakarleby)
Christinea	Kristinestad – (Kristiinankaupunki)
Espo	Espoo – (Esbo)
Fredericia	Hamina – (Fredrikshamn)
Granivicus	Jyväskylä
Helsinkium, Helsingia	Helsinki – (Helsingfors)
Michaelia	Mikkeli – (S:t Michel)
Neo-Carolina	Nykarleby – (Uusikaarlepyy)
Neostadium	Uusikaupunki – (Nystad)
Ostia Carelorum	Joensuu
Portus Mariae	Mariehamn – (Maarianhamina)
Raumoa	Rauma – (Raumo)
Sala	Salo
Tammerforsia	Tampere – (Tammerfors)
Tornea	Tornio – (Torneå)
Uloa	Oulu – (Uleåborg)
Vallis Gratiae	Naantali – (Nådendal)
Vantania	Vantaa – (Vanda)
Vasa	Vaasa – (Vasa)

== Cities and towns in France ==
Canonical Latin name (source(s): variant(s))	English name (native language(s)) – older name(s), (other language(s)), location(s)
Adiacium	Ajaccio
Alberti campus	Champaubert
Andematunnum, Lugdunum, Lingones	Langres
Aquae Sextiae	Aix-en-Provence
Antissiodorum, Autesiodorum	Auxerre
Arelate, Colonia Iulia Paterna Arelatensium Sextanorum	Arles – (Arle)
Argentoratum	Strasbourg
Arpajonum, Arpajoni castrum, Arpacona	Arpajon, Paris
Atrebatum	Arras, Pas-de-Calais
Augusta Argentorate	Strasbourg
Augustobona Tricassium, Tricassae	Troyes
Augustodurum, Bajocae, Bajocassium civitas	Bayeux
Augustodunum	Autun
Aurelianum	Orléans
Autricum, civitas Carnutum, Carnutes	Chartres
Avenio	Avignon
Belna	Beaune
Brestum, Brestia, Brivates Portis	Brest
Briva Isara	Pontoise
Burdigala	Bordeaux
Catalaunum, Catelaunorum	Châlons-sur-Marne
Catculliacum	Saint-Denis, Paris
Condate Riedonum	Rennes
Crisenaria	Cressy
Cularo	Grenoble
Damovilla	Damville
Darioritum	Vannes
Dinia, Diniensium civitas	Digne-les-Bains, Alpes-de-Haute-Provence
Divio	Dijon
Divodurum	Metz
Durocortorum	Reims
Flavia (GOL: Flaviacum)	Saint-Germer-de-Fly, Oise
Flaviniacum (GOL: Flaviacum)	Flavigny-sur-Ozerain, Côte-d'Or
Gesoriacum, Bononia	Boulogne-sur-Mer
Glanum	Saint-Rémy-de-Provence, Bouches-du-Rhône
Lemonum, civitas Pictonum, Pictones	Poitiers
Lugdunum, Colonia Copia Claudia Augusta Lugdunum	Lyon
Lugdunum Clavatum	Laon
Lugdunum Convenarum	Saint-Bertrand-de-Comminges
Lutetia	Paris
Massilia	Marseille
Medicinum	Mézin, Lot-et-Garonne
Mediolanum Aulercorum	Évreux
Mediolanum Santonum	Saintes
Narbo Martius	Narbonne, Aude
Nemausus	Nîmes
Nicaea, Nicia	Nice
Noviodunum	Soissons
Noviomagus Lexoviorum (GOL: Lexovium)	Lisieux, Calvados
Noviomagus Veromanduorum (GOL: Noviomium, Noviomense palatium, Noviomum, Novionum)	Noyon, Oise
Novio Rito (GOL: Niortum, Novirogus, Nyrax)	Niort, Deux-Sèvres
Portus Namnetum	Nantes
Ramboletium	Rambouillet
Rotomagus	Rouen
Samarobriva	Amiens
Sancti Audoeni fanum, villa aut domus	Saint-Ouen, Paris
Spinetum, Spinogelum, Spinoilum, Espinolum	Épinay-sur-Orge, Paris
Tolosa	Toulouse
Tullum Leucorum	Toul
Caesarodunum, Augusta Turonum, Metropolis civitas Turonum, Turonica civitas, Turones, T(h)oronus	Tours
Tutelae	Tulle
Verodunum	Verdun – Wirten
Vesontio	Besançon
Vienna Allobrogium	Vienne, Isère
Viennavicus	Vienne-en-Val, Loiret
Vierium	Vihiers, Maine-et-Loire

== Cities and towns in Germany ==
Canonical Latin name (source(s): variant(s))	English name (native language(s)) – older name(s), (other language(s)), location(s)
Aquae Mattiacorum, Aquae Mattiacae	Wiesbaden, Hessen
(Colonia Claudia) Ara Agrippinensium	Cologne (Köln), North Rhine-Westphalia
Aqua Villae	Badenweiler
Aquisgrana, Aquis Granum, Aquae Grani, Aquensis urbs, Granis aquae	Aachen, Aix-la-Chapelle (fr), North Rhine-Westphalia
Antunnacum	Andernach, Rhineland-Palatinate
Arae Flaviae	Rottweil
Asopus	Aspe
Assindia	Essen, North Rhine-Westphalia
Augusta Vindelicorum	Augsburg
Augusta Treverorum	Trier
Aurelia Aquensis	Baden-Baden
Badena civitas	Baden
Batavis, Castra Batavorum, Castra Batava	Passau
Berolinum	Berlin
Bonna	Bonn, North Rhine-Westphalia
Borbetomagus, Wormatia	Worms
Brema	Bremen
Brunsvicum	Braunschweig – (Brunswick)
Cambodunum	Kempten, Bavaria
Castra Regina, Ratisbona	Regensburg
Castrum Novaesium	Neuss, North Rhine-Westphalia
Chemnitium, Chemnicium	Chemnitz
Cignavia, Cignea, Cygnea, Cynavia	Zwickau
Clivia	Kleve, North Rhine-Westphalia
Colonia Agrippina, Colonia Agrippinensis	Cologne (Köln), North Rhine-Westphalia
Colonia Ulpia Traiana, Vetera	Xanten, North Rhine-Westphalia
(Castellum apud) Confluentes	Koblenz
Constantia	Konstanz – (Constance)
Cruciniacum	Bad Kreuznach, Rhineland-Palatinate
Dispargum	Duisburg
Dresda	Dresden
Emetha, Amuthon, Embda, Emda, Embden	Emden, East Frisia
Erfordia, Erphesfurt	Erfurt, Thuringia
Esilinga, Ezelinga, Ezzilinga	Eßlingen
Francofortum ad Moenum	Frankfurt am Main
Friburgum Brisgoviae	Freiburg im Breisgau
Goettinga	Göttingen
Gorlicium	Görlitz, Saxony
Goslaria	Goslar, Lower Saxony
Hale Suevice	Schwäbisch Hall – Hall in Schwaben, Baden-Württemberg
Hamburgum, Hammonia	Hamburg
Hanovera	Hanover – (Hanover)
Herbipolis	Würzburg
Hildanus	Hilden
Iuliacum	Jülich, North Rhine-Westphalia
Lauriacum	Lorch
Lindaugia, Lindavia	Lindau
Lipsia	Leipzig
Locoritum	Lohr, Bavaria
Lubica (GOL: Lubicana, Lubeca, Lubecum, Lubacovia, Lybichi)	Lübeck, Schleswig-Holstein
Magdeburgum	Magdeburg
Megalopolis	Mecklenburg
Misnia (GOL: Misnensis marchia)	Meissen, Saxony
Moguncia, Moguntia, Moguntiacum, Mogontiacum	Mainz
Monachium, Monacum	Munich (München)
Monasterium in Eifel	Bad Münstereifel
Monasterium Westphaliae	Münster
Norimberga	Nuremberg (Nürnberg)
Northusia	Nordhausen
Novaesium, Novensium	Neuss, North Rhine-Westphalia
Noviomagus Nemetum (GOL: Augusta Nemetum, Nemetis, Nemodona, Spira, Spiratia, Sphira, Spyrea)	Speyer, Rhineland-Palatinate
Noviomagus Trevirorum (NLU; GOL: Augusta Trevirorum, Treviris, Treberis)	Neumagen-Dhron near Trier
Patavia, Castra Batava	Passau
Ratisbona, Radaspona	Regensburg, Bavaria
Rigomagus	Remagen, North Rhine-Westphalia
Rostochium (Rhodopolis)	Rostock
Sumelocenna	Rottenburg am Neckar
Stutgardia, Stuogardia	Stuttgart
Tremonia	Dortmund, North Rhine-Westphalia
Tubinga	Tübingen
Tulpiacum, Tolbiacum	Zülpich, Tolbiac (fr), North Rhine-Westphalia
Vetera, Colonia Ulpia Traiana	Xanten

== Cities and towns in Hungary ==
Canonical Latin name (source(s): variant(s))	English name (native language(s)) – older name(s), (other language(s)), location(s)
Ad Flexum	Mosonmagyaróvár
Aegopolis	Kecskemét
Agria (Medieval Latin)	Eger
Alba Regia	Székesfehérvár
Alisca	Szekszárd
Altinum	Kölked
Annamatia	Baracs
Aquincum	Budapest (Óbuda)
Arrabona	Győr
Brigetio	Komárom / Szőny
Budapestum, Budapestinum, Buda Vetus (Medieval Latin)	Budapest
Caesariana	Baláca
Campona	Budapest (Nagytétény)
Cirpi	Dunabogdány
Civitas Archiepiscopalis	Víziváros (today a part of Esztergom)
Contra-Aquincum	Budapest (Pest)
Contra Constantiam	Dunakeszi
Gorsium, Herculia	Tác
Intercisa	Dunaújváros
Lussonium	Dunakömlőd
Matrica	Százhalombatta
Mursella	Mórichida
Partiscum	Szeged
Quadrata	Lébény
Sala	Zalalövő
Savaria	Szombathely
Scarbantia	Sopron
Solva, Strigonium (Medieval Latin)	Esztergom
Sopianae	Pécs
Tricciana	Ságvár
Valcum	Fenékpuszta
Vetus Salina	Adony
Ulcisia Castra	Szentendre

== Cities and towns in Ireland ==
Canonical Latin name (source(s): variant(s))	English name (native language(s)) – older name(s), (other language(s)), location(s)
Ardachad	Ardagh, County Longford (Ardach)
Ardmachanus	Armagh (Ard Mhacha)
Attar	Adare (Áth Dara)
Baltifordia	Waterford (Port Láirge)
Campulus Bovis	Aghaboe (Achadh Bhó)
Canic	Kilkenny (Cill Chainnigh)
Carlovia	Carlow (Ceatharlach)
Cellumabrath	Kilfenora (Cill Fhionnúrach)
Corcagia (Anuario Pontificio), Coracium	Cork (Corcaigh)
Dublinum, Dublanensis, Dublenensis, Dublina, Dublinensis, Dublinia, Dubliniensis, Dublinium, Duvelinensis, Eblanda, Erlana (2PG1; HLU: Kirkruel?; GOL:	Dublin (Baile Átha Cliath)
Galvia	Galway (Gaillimh)
Hanahannassa	Ballyhaunis (Béal Átha hAmhnais)
Lagisia (Annals of Tigernach)	County Laois (Loígis)
Manutium	Maynooth (Maigh Nuad)
Nas (Castrum Nasense)	Naas (Nás na Ríogh)
Ruscomia	Roscommon (Ros Comáin)
Saltus Salmonis	Leixlip (Léim an Bhradáin)
Sanctum Nemus (Red Book of Ormond)	Hollywood, County Wicklow (Cillín Chaoimhín)

== Cities and towns in Latvia ==
Canonical Latin name (source(s): variant(s))	English name (native language(s)) – older name(s), (other language(s)), location(s)
Rugensis civitas	Riga

== Cities and towns in Moldova ==
Canonical Latin name (source(s): variant(s))	English name (native language(s)) – older name(s), (other language(s)), location(s)
Grigoriopolis	Grigoriopol
Tiraspolis	Tiraspol

== Cities and towns in Monaco ==
Canonical Latin name (source(s): variant(s))	English name (native language(s)) – older name(s), (other language(s)), location(s)
Monaecum (GOL: Monoecum, Portus Herculis Monoeci)	Monaco

== Cities and towns in the Netherlands ==
Canonical Latin name (source(s): variant(s))	English name (native language(s)) – older name(s), (other language(s)), location(s)
Ad Duodecimum	unknown location
Albaniana	Alphen aan den Rijn
Alcmaria	Alkmaar
Amivadum	Amersfoort
Amstelodamum	Amsterdam
Arenacum	Arnhem
Blariacum	Blerick
Carvium	Herwen (De Bijland)
Carvo	Kesteren
Caspingio	unknown location
Castra Herculis	Arnhem (Meinerswijk)
Ceuclum	Cuijk
Coriovallum	Heerlen
Daventria	Deventer
Eindovia	Eindhoven
Elenio	Naaldwijk
Fectio	Vechten
Flevum	Velsen
Forum Hadriani	Voorburg
Ganuentum	(Colijnsplaat)
Grinnes	Rossum/Alem
Horgana	Hargen
Laurium, Laurum	Woerden
Lefevanum	Wijk bij Duurstede
Lugdunum, Lugdunum Batavorum	Katwijk (Brittenburg)
Matilo	Leiden (Roomburg)
Maunnaricium	Maurik
Mosae Traiectum	Maastricht
Municipium Aelium Cananefatum	Voorburg
Nigrum Pullum	Zwammerdam
Praetorium Agrippinae	Katwijk (Valkenburg)
Ruraemunde	Roermond
Sablones	Venlo
Silva Ducis	's-Hertogenbosch (Den Bosch)
Tablis	unknown location
Traiectum	Utrecht
Traiectum ad Mosam	Maastricht
Ulpia Noviomagus Batavorum (HLU; GOL: Batavodurum, Niumagum, Niwimagum, Neumaia)	Nijmegen
Venlonum	Venlo
Vienna (Nederlandia), Vigenna	Vianen
Vadae	Wageningen

== Cities and towns in Norway ==
Canonical Latin name (source(s): variant(s))	English name (native language(s)) – older name(s), (other language(s)), location(s)
Asloa	Oslo
Berga	Bergen

== Cities and towns in Poland ==
Canonical Latin name (source(s): variant(s))	English name (native language(s)) – older name(s), (other language(s)), location(s)
Aurimontium, Aureus Mons, Auri Mons	Złotoryja
Bethania, Bithomia	Bytom
Bilici-Biala, Bielici-Biala	Bielsko-Biała
Bydgostia	Bydgoszcz
Calisia	Kalisz
Cervimontium, Mons Cervi (adj. cervimontanus, hirschbergensis)	Jelenia Góra
Cracovia	Kraków
Culmen	Chełmno
Elbinga, Elbingus, Elbinca, Elbangum, Elbingense castrum	Elbląg
Gedania, Gedanum, Dantiscum	Gdańsk
Glivitium	Gliwice
Ostrovia	Ostrów Wielkopolski
Posnania, Poznania	Poznań
Resovia	Rzeszów
Sandomir	Sandomierz
Siradia	Sieradz
Stargardia	Stargard
Sedinum, (Stettinum)	Szczecin
Thorunium	Toruń
Varsovia, Varsavia	Warsaw (Warszawa)
Vratislavia, Wratislavia	Wrocław

== Cities and towns in Russia ==
Canonical Latin name (source(s): variant(s))	English name (native language(s)) – older name(s), (other language(s)), location(s)
Archangelopolis (GOL: S. Michaeli Archangeli fanum, Michaelopolis)	Arkhangelsk
Asovia (GOL: Assovium; HLU: Tanais)	Azov
Astrachanum	Astrachan
Belogradum	Belgorod
Caluga (HLU: Coluga)	Kaluga
Casanum (GOL: Kazanum)	Kazan
Catharinoburgum	Yekaterinburg
Columna	Kolomna
Demitriovia	Dmitrov
Iaroslavia (GOL: Jereslavia)	Yaroslavl
Iuliania	Ulyanovsk
Moscua, Mosqua, Moscovia (HLU: Moscha)	Moscow
Novogardia Inferior	Nizhny Novgorod
Novogardia Magna	Veliky Novgorod
Orenburgum	Orenburg
Permia	Perm
Petropolis, Petroburgum (GOL: St. Petri fanum)	Saint Petersburg
Pscovia, Plescovia	Pskov
Regiomontium (GOL: Regiomontum, Regalis, Regius)	Kaliningrad – Königsberg
Resania (GOL: Rhezania; HLU: Rezana)	Ryazan
Rostovia	Rostov
Saratovia (HLU: Soratovia)	Saratov
Smolenscum (GOL: Smolska)	Smolensk
Stauropolis	Stavropol
Susdalia (HLU: Susdala)	Suzdal
Toropetia	Toropets
Tueria (GOL: Tuera, Twera)	Tver
Ustiuga	Veliky Ustyug
Volodimiria	Vladimir
Vologda (HLU: Volochda)	Vologda
Viatcia, Venetica	Kirov – Vyatka
Viburga, Viburgum, Viburgum Careliorum (GOL: Viburgus)	Vyborg

== Cities and towns in San Marino ==
Canonical Latin name (source(s): variant(s))	English name (native language(s)) – older name(s), (other language(s)), location(s)
Aqua Viva	Acquaviva
Burgus Maior	Borgo Maggiore
Domenianus	Domagnano
Ecclesia Nova	Chiesanuova
Faetanum, Fagetanum	Faetano
Florentinum	Fiorentino
Marinum, Fanum Sancti Marini	San Marino
Mons Viridarium	Montegiardino
Olnanum	Serravalle

== Cities and towns in Slovakia ==
Canonical Latin name (source(s): variant(s))	English name (native language(s)) – older name(s), (other language(s)), location(s)
Cassovia	Košice
Castrum Novum	Nové Zámky
Bartfa	Bardejov
Forum Dominarum	Bátovce
Semnichia	Banská Štiavnica
Celemantia	Iža (Izsa)
Cismarcinum, Forum Caseorum	Kežmarok
Comaromium	Komárno
Crempnichia	Kremnica
Leuchovia	Levoča
Prividia	Prievidza
Iglovia, Nova Villa	Spišská Nová Ves
Suburbium, Villa Sub Castro	Spišské Vlachy
Lublovia	Stará Ľubovňa
Divinium	Devín
Villa Theutonicalis	Poprad
Eperiessinum, Fragopolis	Prešov
Gerulata	Rusovce, Bratislava
Laugaricio	Trenčín
Tyrnavia	Trnava
Neosolium	Banská Bystrica
Posonium, Wratisslaburgium	Bratislava
Veterosolium, Vetusolium, Solium	Zvolen

== Cities and towns in Slovenia ==
Canonical Latin name (source(s): variant(s))	English name (native language(s)) – older name(s), (other language(s)), location(s)
Iustinopolis, Caput Histriae	Koper
Labacum, Aemona	Ljubljana
Marburgum	Maribor
Mons Carniolae	Kranjska Gora
Nova Urbs	Novo Mesto
Poetovium	Ptuj

== Cities and towns in Sweden ==
Canonical Latin name (source(s): variant(s))	English name (native language(s)) – older name(s), (other language(s)), location(s)
Amalia	Åmål
Arosia	Västerås
Boërosia	Borås
Calmaria	Kalmar
Caroli Corona	Karlskrona
Christinae portus	Kristinehamn
Christiania	Kristianstad
Cimbrorum portus	Simrishamn
Clara Vallis	Ljusdal
Copinga	Köping
Coronia	Landskrona
Dalecarlius	Dalälven
Delisboa	Delsbo
Eckesioea, Ecksium	Eksjö
Encopia	Enköping
Falcopia	Falköping
Gevalia	Gävle
Gothia	Gothenburg (Göteborg)
Halmostadium	Halmstad
Hiovia	Hjo
Holmia, Stockholmia	Stockholm
Hudvicovaldum	Hudiksvall
Iuncopia	Jönköping
Lagaholmia	Laholm (older Swedish name: Lagaholm)
Lidcopia	Lidköping
Lincopia	Linköping
Lindesberga, Linda	Lindesberg
Lula	Luleå
Lunda	Lund
Malmögia	Malmö
Medicorum villa	Medevibrunn
Nicopia	Nyköping
Norcopia	Norrköping
Örebrogia	Örebro
Øresundae	Öresund
Pax Mariae	Mariefred
Pitovia	Piteå
Schedina	Skövde
Stenbrovium	Stenbro
Stocholmia, Holmia	Stockholm
Sudercopia	Söderköping
Telga	Södertälje (older Swedish name: Tälje)
Upsala	Uppsala
Uraniburgum	Uranienborg
Urbs Mariae	Mariestad
Vadstenium	Vadstena
Vemmaria, Wemmaria	Vimmerby
Vexionia	Växjö
Visbia	Visby
Visingsburgum, Wisingsburgum	Visingsborg
Ystadium, Istadium, Ustadium	Ystad

== Cities and towns in Switzerland ==
Canonical Latin name (source(s): variant(s))	English name (native language(s)) – older name(s), (other language(s)), location(s)
Acaunum, Agaunum	Saint-Maurice
Ad Fines	Pfyn
Aquae Helveticae	Baden
Arbor Felix	Arbon
Augusta Raurica	Kaiseraugst / Augst
Aventicum	Avenches
Basilia, Basilea	Basel
Berna	Bern
Brienzola	Brienz
Brunntrudum, Bruntraut	Porrentruy, Pruntrut (de)
Centum Prata	Kempraten, Jona and Rapperswil
Curia	Chur, Graubünden
Eburodunum	Yverdon-les-Bains
Esquinia	Écône
Genava	Geneva
Lousonna	Lausanne
Morgiis	Morges
Noviodunum (Colonia Iulia Equestris)	Nyon
Octodurum	Martigny
Solodurum/Salodurum	Solothurn
Suitia	Schwyz
Tugium	Zug
Turicum	Zürich
Urba	Orbe
Vibiscum	Vevey
Vindonissa	Windisch
Vitudurum	Winterthur

== Cities and towns in Ukraine ==
Canonical Latin name (source(s): variant(s))	English name (native language(s)) – older name(s), (other language(s)), location(s)
Alexandria	Oleksandriia
Alustum, Lusta	Alushta
Bialoquerca	Bila Tserkva
Calamita	Inkerman
Caulita	Yalta
Charcovia, Charkovia	Kharkiv
Chiovia, Kiovia	Kyiv
Chersonium	Kherson
Chersonesus Nordica	Korsun-Shevchenkivskyi
Czernihovia	Chernihiv
Eupatoria	Yevpatoria
Leopolis	Lviv
Marinopolis	Mariiampil
Mariupolis	Mariupol
Melitopolis	Melitopol
Novogardia Severiae	Novhorod-Siverskyi
Ovidiopolis	Ovidiopol
Panticapaeum, Cimmericum, Bosporus Cimmericum	Kerch
Pereaslavia	Pereiaslav
Sebastopolis, Chersonesus Taurica	Sevastopol
Solcata	Stary Krym
Sugdaia	Sudak
Symbolum Portus	Balaklava
Sympheropolis, Neapolis Scythica	Simferopol
Ternopolis	Ternopil
Theodoros, Doros	Mangup
Theodosia, Caffa	Feodosia
Theophania	Feofaniia

== See also ==
- List of Latin place names in Iberia
- List of Latin place names in the Balkans
- List of Latin place names used as specific names

== Sources ==
In order of likely publication:

- PNH: Pliny (Gaius Plinius Secundus), Naturalis Historia; book "PNH" chapter (that is, "37PNH81" instead of the usual "N.H.xxxvii.81").
- PG: Ptolemy (Claudius Ptolemaeus), Geographia; book "PG" chapter (that is, "2PG3" instead of the usual "II.3"). Ptolemy wrote in Greek, so names are transliterated back into Latin to reveal the original form.
- HLU: Hofmann, Johann Jacob (1635–1706): Lexicon Universale
- GOL: The standard reference to Latin placenames, with their modern equivalents, is Dr. J. G. Th. Grässe, Orbis Latinus: Lexikon lateinischer geographischer Namen des Mittelalters und der Neuzeit (1861), an exhaustive work of meticulous German scholarship that is available on-line in the second edition of 1909. To use it, one must understand German names of countries, as they were in 1909. The original was re-edited and expanded in a multi-volume edition in 1972.
