= Écouché-les-Vallées =

- Commune
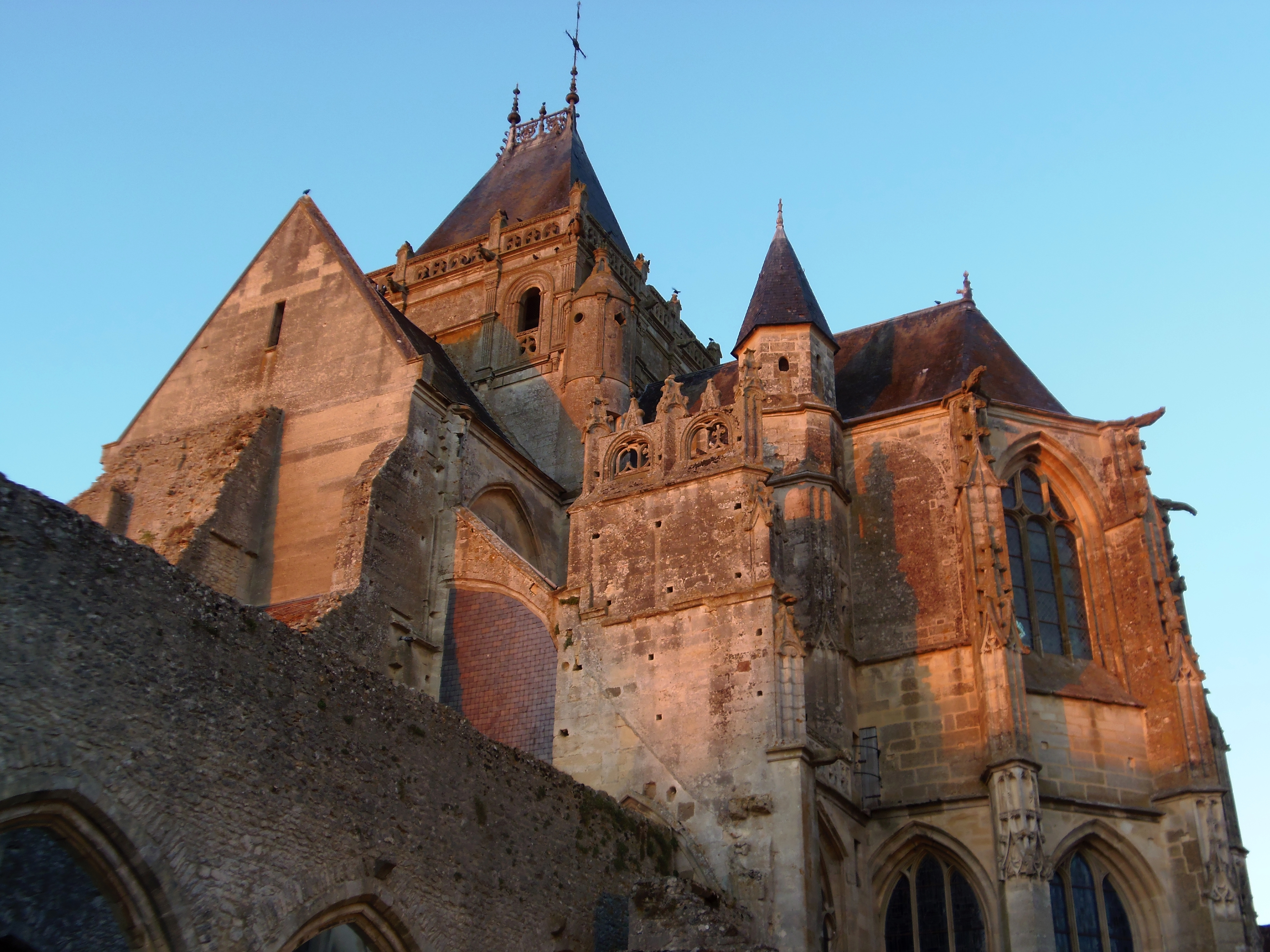
- The church in Écouché
- Location of Écouché-les-Vallées
- Location within France Location within Normandy
- Coordinates: 48°43′05″N 0°07′30″W
- Country: France
- Region: Normandy
- Department: Orne
- Arrondissement: Argentan
- Canton: Magny-le-Désert
- Intercommunality: Terres d'Argentan Interco

Government
  - Mayor (2020–2026): Alain Lolivier
- Area^{1}: 41.23 km^{2} (15.92 sq mi)
- Population (2023): 2,193
  - Density: 53.19/km^{2} (137.8/sq mi)
- Time zone: UTC+01:00 (CET)
  - Summer (DST): UTC+02:00 (CEST)
- INSEE/Postal code: 61153 /61150
- ^{1} French Land Register data, which excludes lakes, ponds, glaciers > 1 km^{2} (0.386 sq mi or 247 acres) and river estuaries.

Écouché-les-Vallées (French pronunciation: [ekuʃe le vale]) is a commune in the department of Orne, northwestern France. The municipality was established on 1 January 2016 by merger of the former communes of Batilly, La Courbe, Écouché (the seat), Loucé, Saint-Ouen-sur-Maire and Serans. On 1 January 2018, the former commune of Fontenai-sur-Orne was merged into Écouché-les-Vallées. Its seat, Écouché, is classed as a Petite Cité de Caractère.

== Geography ==
The commune is made up of the following collection of villages and hamlets: La Courbe, Mesnil-Glaise, Le Haut du Château, Batilly, Treize Saints, L'Être Hubert, Saint-Ouen-sur-Maire, Serans, Écouché, Méheudin, Loucé, Noiseville, Le Hamel and Fontenai-sur-Orne.

The parts of the commune that contains Batilly and La Courbe is part of the area known as Suisse Normande.

Parts of the commune make up the area, the Plaine d'Argentan, which is known for its cereal growing fileds and horse stud farms.

Écouché-les-Vallées along with another 65 communes is part of a 20,593 hectare, Natura 2000 conservation area, called the Haute vallée de l'Orne et affluents.

The Commune has 5 rivers running through it with another 6 streams. The five rivers are the Orne, Maire, Baize, Cance and Udon. The 6 streams are the Chalau, Commune, Barbottiere, Vloger and Aunais.

== Population ==
Population data refer to the area corresponding with the commune as of January 2025.

Historical population
Year	Pop.	±% p.a.
1968	2,218	—
1975	2,245	+0.17%
1982	2,291	+0.29%
1990	2,298	+0.04%
1999	2,284	−0.07%
2007	2,303	+0.10%
2012	2,218	−0.75%
2017	2,169	−0.45%
2023	2,193	+0.18%
Source: INSEE

== Notable buildings and places ==
- Parc de Sculptures de l'Atelier Balias is a 4 Hectare garden that is open to the public. It features over 55 statues today and was created in 1825. The grounds also feature a 12 hole Swingolf course.
- Gardens of Méheudin. is a 2 ha garden and Arboretum in Écouché. The Garden was started in 1978 and features over 300 types of trees and ornamental shrubs.

=== National heritage sites ===
The Commune has 5 buildings and areas listed as a Monument historique.

- Lower grounds of la Courbe a barred spur from a Protohistory site.
- Upper Castle grounds a Protohistory site that still has remains of the ditches and embankments used for the castle.
- la Queurie Lodge a 15th century manor in La Courbe.
- Notre Dame Church a 13th century church in Ecouché.
- Loucé Church a 12th century church in Loucé.

== Notable people ==
- André Chéradame French journalist and scholar from the École Libre des Sciences Politiques born in 1871 in Ecouches.

== Twin town ==
- Elze, Germany since 1971.

== Transport ==
The commune has a Railway station in Écouché, that was opened in 1866 and serves part of the Argentan to Granville line.

== See also ==
- Communes of the Orne department
