= Batilly =

Batilly may refer to the following communes in France:

- Batilly, Meurthe-et-Moselle, in the Meurthe-et-Moselle department
- Batilly, Orne, in the Orne department
- Batilly-en-Gâtinais, in the Loiret department
- Batilly-en-Puisaye, in the Loiret department
