= Saint-Ouen =

Saint-Ouen may refer to:

- Saint Ouen, a Catholic and Orthodox saint

== Places ==
=== France ===
Saint-Ouen is the name of several communes in France:

- Saint-Ouen, Loir-et-Cher, in the Loir-et-Cher département
- Saint-Ouen, Somme, in the Somme département

It is also part of the name of several communes:

- Saint-Ouen-d'Attez, in the Eure département
- Saint-Ouen-d'Aunis, in the Charente-Maritime département
- Saint-Ouen-de-la-Cour, in the Orne département
- Saint-Ouen-de-Mimbré, in the Sarthe département
- Saint-Ouen-de-Pontcheuil, in the Eure département
- Saint-Ouen-des-Alleux, in the Ille-et-Vilaine département
- Saint Ouen des Besaces, in the Calvados département
- Saint-Ouen-des-Champs, in the Eure département
- Saint-Ouen-de-Sécherouvre, in the Orne département
- Saint-Ouën-des-Toits, in the Mayenne département
- Saint-Ouën-des-Vallons, in the Mayenne département
- Saint-Ouen-de-Thouberville, in the Eure département
- Saint-Ouen-Domprot, in the Marne département
- Saint-Ouen-du-Breuil, in the Seine-Maritime département
- Saint-Ouen-du-Mesnil-Oger, in the Calvados département
- Saint-Ouen-du-Tilleul, in the Eure département
- Saint-Ouen-en-Belin, in the Sarthe département
- Saint-Ouen-en-Brie, in the Seine-et-Marne département
- Saint-Ouen-en-Champagne, in the Sarthe département
- Saint-Ouen-la-Rouërie, in the Ille-et-Vilaine département
- Saint-Ouen-la-Thène, in the Charente-Maritime département
- Saint-Ouen-l'Aumône, in the Val-d'Oise département
- Saint-Ouen-le-Brisoult, in the Orne département
- Saint-Ouen-le-Houx, in the Calvados département
- Saint-Ouen-le-Mauger, in the Seine-Maritime département
- Saint-Ouen-le-Pin, in the Calvados département
- Saint-Ouen-lès-Parey, in the Vosges département
- Saint-Ouen-les-Vignes, in the Indre-et-Loire département
- Saint-Ouen-Marchefroy, in the Eure-et-Loir département
- Saint-Ouen-sous-Bailly, in the Seine-Maritime département
- Saint-Ouen-sur-Gartempe, in the Haute-Vienne département
- Saint-Ouen-sur-Iton, in the Orne département
- Saint-Ouen-sur-Loire, in the Nièvre département
- Saint-Ouen-sur-Maire, in the Orne département
- Saint-Ouen-sur-Morin, in the Seine-et-Marne département
- Saint-Ouen-sur-Seine, in the Seine-Saint-Denis département
- Basilica of St. Ouen, Rouen, famous for its Gothic architecture and its pipe organ by Aristide Cavaillé-Coll
- Saint-Ouen Cemetery in Paris

=== Jersey ===
- Saint Ouen, Jersey, a parish
- St. Ouen F.C., a football club in the above parish
