= Loucé =

- Part of Écouché-les-Vallées
- Location of Loucé
- Location within France Location within Normandy
- Coordinates: 48°42′10″N 0°06′01″W
- Country: France
- Region: Normandy
- Department: Orne
- Arrondissement: Argentan
- Canton: Magny-le-Désert
- Commune: Écouché-les-Vallées
- Area^{1}: 4.12 km^{2} (1.59 sq mi)
- Elevation: 150 m (490 ft)
- Highest elevation: 178 m (584 ft)
- Lowest elevation: 149 m (489 ft)
- Population (2022): 109
  - Density: 26.5/km^{2} (68.5/sq mi)
- Time zone: UTC+01:00 (CET)
  - Summer (DST): UTC+02:00 (CEST)
- Postal code: 61150
- ^{1} French Land Register data, which excludes lakes, ponds, glaciers > 1 km^{2} (0.386 sq mi or 247 acres) and river estuaries.

Loucé (French pronunciation: [luse]) is a former commune in the Orne department in north-western France. On 1 January 2016, it was merged into the new commune of Écouché-les-Vallées.

== See also ==
- Communes of the Orne department
- Château de la Motte, Joué du Plain
