= Serans =

Serans may refer to the following places in France:

- Serans, Oise, a commune in the Oise department
- Serans, Orne, a commune in the Orne department
