= Lacourbe =

Lacourbe may refer to:

- Lacourbe (city), a place near Ouled-Agla in Algeria, possible site of Ancient Equizetum

Persons

- Roland Lacourbe, French film critic
- (fiction) Lieutenant Lacourbe, a friend of d'Hubert Maurice Colbourne as Feraud's second in The Duellists

== See also ==
- La Courbe, commune
