= Écouché =

Commune in Orne department, France

- Part of Écouché-les-Vallées
- Coat of arms
- Location of Écouché
- Location within France Location within Normandy
- Coordinates: 48°43′05″N 0°07′25″W
- Country: France
- Region: Normandy
- Department: Orne
- Arrondissement: Argentan
- Canton: Magny-le-Désert
- Commune: Écouché-les-Vallées
- Area^{1}: 5.22 km^{2} (2.02 sq mi)
- Highest elevation: 184 m (604 ft)
- Lowest elevation: 147 m (482 ft)
- Population (2022): 1,351
  - Density: 259/km^{2} (670/sq mi)
- Time zone: UTC+01:00 (CET)
  - Summer (DST): UTC+02:00 (CEST)
- Postal code: 61150
- ^{1} French Land Register data, which excludes lakes, ponds, glaciers > 1 km^{2} (0.386 sq mi or 247 acres) and river estuaries.

Écouché (French pronunciation: [ekuʃe]) is a former commune in the Orne department in north-western France. On 1 January 2016, it was merged into the new commune of Écouché-les-Vallées.

== The village ==
Écouché stands out today for the monumental church, a very rare Republican altar, several medieval merchants' houses, a number of original towers, a network of well-conserved lanes and – a reminder of the ordeal of World War II and the Liberation – a M4 Sherman assault tank.

Until 2015, Écouché was the administrative centre of a canton within the arrondissement of Argentan.

It is classed as a Petite Cité de Caractère.

== History timeline ==
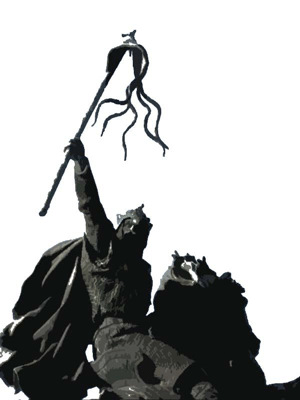
Romantic 19th century sculpture of William the Conqueror at Falaise

The origin of human settlement remains obscure. It can be supposed that the Gauls(Celts) and the Gallo-Romans recognised the advantages of the site, but the earliest written documents available that mention SCOCEI date only from 1066 (a grant of tithes from Gacé and Écouché by William the Conqueror to his wife Mathilda at the Ladies' Abbey (Abbaye aux Dames ) in Caen).

SCOCEI viendrait du mot SCOTTI, moines irlandais du 6è siècle (Jean-Michel Picart, Université de Dublin)

The place-name later evolved to Scocetum, Escocheum, Escochie, Escouche and finally Écouché.

Disputes have arisen over the origin of the name, but the more classical version is that it started with a man's name of SCOTTIUS followed by the Latin possessive suffix ACUS, meaning "the property of Scottius". This implies a Roman origin

- 1045: the town had to meet the demands of the three sons of Guillaume Soreng, bandit chiefs who attacked the Diocese of Sées with fire and sword.

== Écouché before the Revolution ==
The Lords

With the exception of a few years in the 18th century, the feudal lords of Ecouché never made it their home. Alfred de Caix drew up a long list of the lords in his Histoire du bourg d'Écouché, most notable of whom were:

- Raoul de Gacé
- William the Conqueror, Duke of Normandy, King of England (1028–1089)
- Girard de Gournay, who took part in the Crusade of 1096

Thereafter, and for five centuries, the lordship was split into two branches:

- Hugues de Gournay, who shone at the siege of St.John of Acre in 1192
- King Philippe Auguste, of France (1165–1223)
- Henry FitzHugh, Chamberlain of the King of England during the English occupation
- King Henry of Navarre (1503–1559)
- the Harcourt family

Reunification of the lordship

- Gabriel II, Count de Montgomery, of an old Norman and English family, purchased one half of the lordship at auction on 13 May 1607 for the sum of 20,000 Pounds. He then inherited the other half from Girard de Gournay; Gabriel II was the son of the accidental murderer of King Henri II in a tournament in Paris in 1559
- Jean Baptiste Ango, who was the last of the lords.
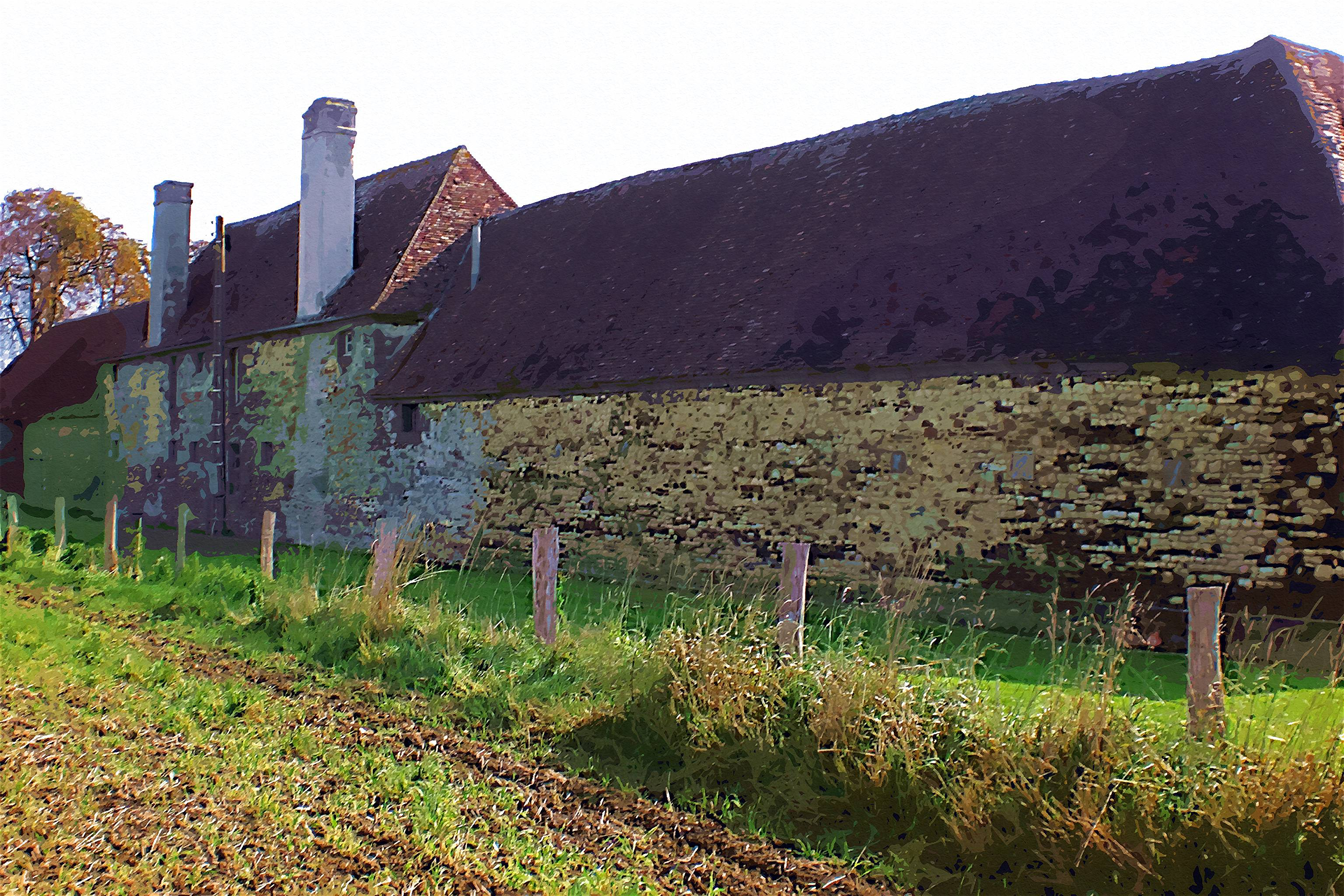
  Farm from north

== World War II ==
During World War II Écouché's buildings and homes suffered 15% heavy damage from aerial bombing and street fighting during the liberation. Most of the destruction followed the railroad tracks.

== See also ==
- Communes of the Orne department
- Château de la Motte, Joué du Plain
