= Serans, Orne =

Serans
- Part of Écouché-les-Vallées
- Location of Serans
- Location within France Location within Normandy
- Coordinates: 48°43′20″N 0°07′38″W
- Country: France
- Region: Normandy
- Department: Orne
- Arrondissement: Argentan
- Canton: Magny-le-Désert
- Commune: Écouché-les-Vallées
- Area^{1}: 6.10 km^{2} (2.36 sq mi)
- Elevation: 150 m (490 ft)
- Highest elevation: 219 m (719 ft)
- Lowest elevation: 144 m (472 ft)
- Population (2022): 201
  - Density: 33.0/km^{2} (85.3/sq mi)
- Time zone: UTC+01:00 (CET)
  - Summer (DST): UTC+02:00 (CEST)
- Postal code: 61150
- ^{1} French Land Register data, which excludes lakes, ponds, glaciers > 1 km^{2} (0.386 sq mi or 247 acres) and river estuaries.

Serans (French pronunciation: [seʁɑ̃]) is a former commune in the Orne department in north-western France. On 1 January 2016, it was merged into the new commune of Écouché-les-Vallées.

== See also ==
- Communes of the Orne department
- Château de la Motte, Joué du Plain
