= André Chéradame =

French journalist

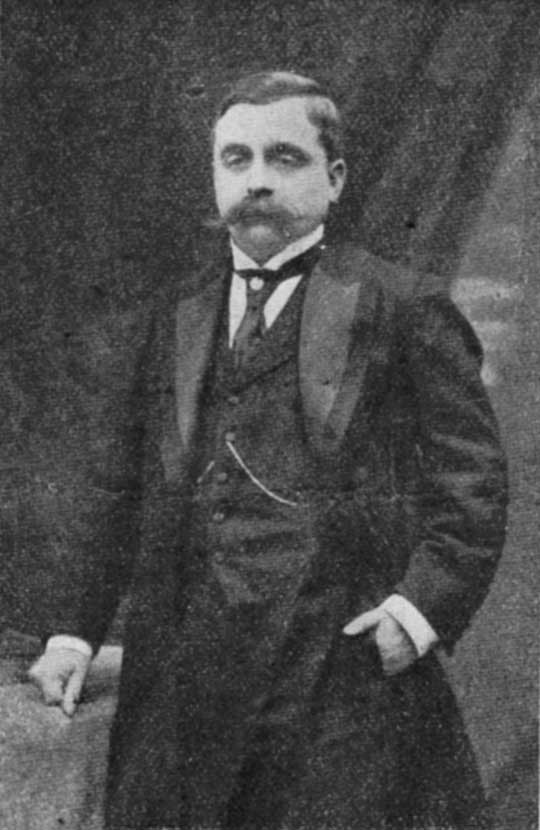
- André Chéradame
- Born: 6 August 1871; Écouché, France
- Died: 15 October 1948 (aged 77); Écouché, France
- Resting place: Écouché-les-Vallées
- Occupation: journalist

André Chéradame (1871–1948) was a French journalist and scholar from the École Libre des Sciences Politiques. He also worked for the French newspaper Le Petit Journal.

He became known for his books about the geopolitics of Europe during the first half of the 20th century, mainly the aspects of German militarism and its expansionist policies. He predicted, even before the two world wars, that the German General Staff would have a main role in planning military aggressions with the aim of creating a Greater Germany, which would first engulf Central and Eastern Europe, then all of Europe, and by 1950 the rest of the world.

He predicted that only by dismantling the militarist German elites and institutions Germany itself would be at peace with the rest of the world; the Allies did so after World War II by dissolving both Prussia and the German General Staff.

== Bibliography ==
- Nicolas Ginsburger, "André Chéradame et l'émergence d'une cartographie géopolitique de guerre en 1916", Cartes & Géomatique, n°223, mars 2015, p. 79-90.
