= Fontenai-sur-Orne =

- Part of Écouché-les-Vallées
- Location of Fontenai-sur-Orne
- Location within France Location within Normandy
- Coordinates: 48°43′25″N 0°04′11″W
- Country: France
- Region: Normandy
- Department: Orne
- Arrondissement: Argentan
- Canton: Argentan-1
- Commune: Écouché-les-Vallées
- Area^{1}: 6.51 km^{2} (2.51 sq mi)
- Highest elevation: 193 m (633 ft)
- Lowest elevation: 147 m (482 ft)
- Population (2022): 241
  - Density: 37.0/km^{2} (95.9/sq mi)
- Demonym: Fontenois
- Time zone: UTC+01:00 (CET)
  - Summer (DST): UTC+02:00 (CEST)
- Postal code: 61200
- ^{1} French Land Register data, which excludes lakes, ponds, glaciers > 1 km^{2} (0.386 sq mi or 247 acres) and river estuaries.

Fontenai-sur-Orne (French pronunciation: [fɔ̃tnɛ syʁ ɔʁn], literally Fontenai on Orne) is a former commune in the Orne department in north-western France. On 1 January 2018, it was merged into the commune of Écouché-les-Vallées.

== See also ==
- Communes of the Orne department
