= Noviomagus =

Noviomagus is the name of a number of settlements found across the Western Roman Empire. The name is believed to be a Latinization of a Brittonic placename, Novio meaning "New" and -magos, meaning "Field" or "Market" (cf. Welsh maes 'field', Old Irish mag 'plain'), in other words a clearing in woodland.

Noviomagus may refer to:

== Places ==
=== France ===
- Noviomagus Lexoviorum ("Noviomagus of the Lexovii"), the Gallo-Roman settlement at Lisieux, France
- Noviomagus Veromanduorum ("Noviomagus of the Veromandui"), the Gallo-Roman settlement at Noyon, France
- Noviomagus Tricastinorum ("Noviomagus of the Tricastini"), later known as "Augusta" and "Colonia Flavia Tricastinorum", the Gallo-Roman settlement at Saint-Paul-Trois-Châteaux, France

=== Germany ===
- Noviomagus Nemetum ("Noviomagus of the Nemetes"), the Germano-Roman settlement at Speyer, Germany
- Noviomagus Trevirorum ("Noviomagus of the Trevii"), the Germano-Roman settlement at Neumagen-Dhron near Trier, Germany

=== Great Britain ===
- Noviomagus Reginorum ("Noviomagus of the Regnenses"), the Romano-British settlement at Chichester, West Sussex, in England
- Noviomagus Cantiacorum ("Noviomagus of the Kentish"), the Romano-British settlement probably located at West Wickham, London (though Crayford has also been suggested)
- Noviomagus, the previous site mistakenly placed by John Dunkin near Dartford, England, usually quoted as Crayford

=== The Netherlands ===
- Ulpia Noviomagus Batavorum ("Ulpian Noviomagus of the Batavians"), the Germano-Roman settlement at Nijmegen in the Netherlands

== People ==
- Daniel Santbech Noviomagus, Dutch mathematician and astronomer (died circa 1561) has given his name to the Santbech crater on the Moon

== See also ==
- Noviomagum, a minor planet
- Neumagen, a river in the Black Forest
- Nijmegen, a city in The Netherlands
