= Lugdunum (disambiguation) =

Lugdunum is a classical Roman place name, most commonly referring to one of two places:

- Lugdunum, Gaul; now Lyon, France
- Lugdunum Batavorum, a castellum on the mouth of the Rhine river near Katwijk, Netherlands

Other places:

- Lugdunum Convenarum, now Saint-Bertrand-de-Comminges, France
- Lugdunum Clavatum, now Laon, France
- Lugdunum Consoranorum, now Saint-Lizier, France

Lugdunum may also refer to:

- Lugdunum (museum), formerly the Gallo-Roman Museum of Lyon-Fourvière, in Lyon, France
- Lugdunum Server, a server software for the EDonkey network
