= La Courbe =

- Part of Écouché-les-Vallées
- Location of La Courbe
- Location within France Location within Normandy
- Coordinates: 48°44′45″N 0°11′20″W
- Country: France
- Region: Normandy
- Department: Orne
- Arrondissement: Argentan
- Canton: Magny-le-Désert
- Commune: Écouché-les-Vallées
- Area^{1}: 5.05 km^{2} (1.95 sq mi)
- Elevation: 180 m (590 ft)
- Highest elevation: 247 m (810 ft)
- Lowest elevation: 135 m (443 ft)
- Population (2022): 63
  - Density: 12/km^{2} (32/sq mi)
- Time zone: UTC+01:00 (CET)
  - Summer (DST): UTC+02:00 (CEST)
- Postal code: 61150
- ^{1} French Land Register data, which excludes lakes, ponds, glaciers > 1 km^{2} (0.386 sq mi or 247 acres) and river estuaries.

La Courbe (French pronunciation: [la kuʁb]) is a former commune in the Orne department in north-western France. On 1 January 2016, it was merged into the new commune of Écouché-les-Vallées.

The former commune is part of the area known as Suisse Normande.

== See also ==
- Communes of the Orne department
