= Saint-Ouen-lès-Parey =

- Commune
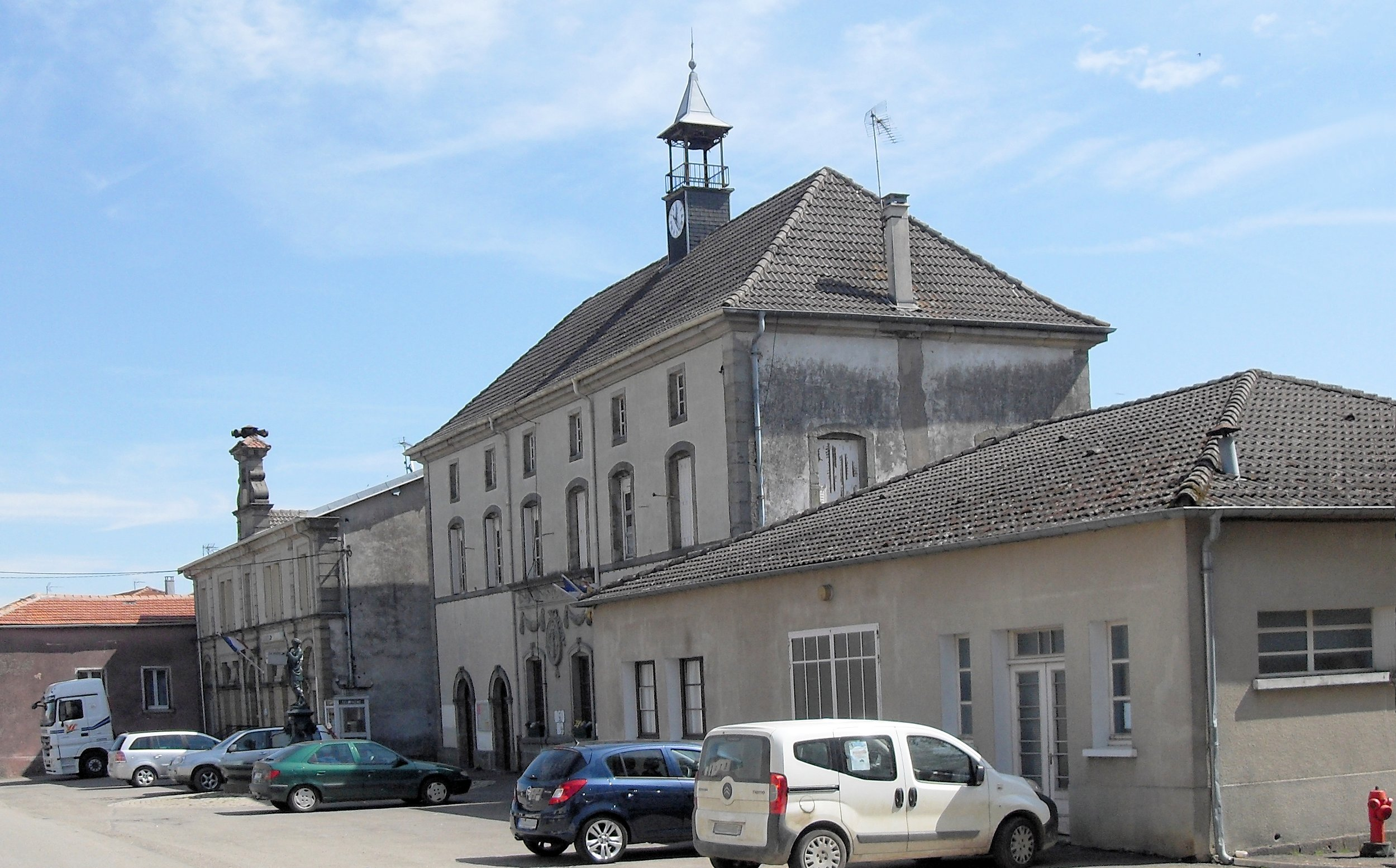
- The town hall in Saint-Ouen-lès-Parey
- Location of Saint-Ouen-lès-Parey
- Location within France Location within Grand Est
- Coordinates: 48°11′00″N 5°45′53″E
- Country: France
- Region: Grand Est
- Department: Vosges
- Arrondissement: Neufchâteau
- Canton: Vittel
- Intercommunality: CC Terre d'eau

Government
  - Mayor (2020–2026): Jean-Luc Noviant
- Area^{1}: 21.09 km^{2} (8.14 sq mi)
- Elevation: 336 m (1,102 ft)
- Highest elevation: 435 m (1,427 ft)
- Lowest elevation: 322 m (1,056 ft)
- Population (2023): 487
  - Density: 23.1/km^{2} (59.8/sq mi)
- Time zone: UTC+01:00 (CET)
  - Summer (DST): UTC+02:00 (CEST)
- INSEE/Postal code: 88430 /88140
- ^{1} French Land Register data, which excludes lakes, ponds, glaciers > 1 km^{2} (0.386 sq mi or 247 acres) and river estuaries.

Saint-Ouen-lès-Parey (French pronunciation: [sɛ̃.t‿wɛ̃ lɛ paʁɛ], literally Saint-Ouen near Parey) is a commune in the Vosges department in Grand Est in northeastern France.

== See also ==
- Communes of the Vosges department
