= Saint-Ouen-sur-Maire =

- Part of Écouché-les-Vallées
- Location of Saint-Ouen-sur-Maire
- Location within France Location within Normandy
- Coordinates: 48°42′18″N 0°10′41″W
- Country: France
- Region: Normandy
- Department: Orne
- Arrondissement: Argentan
- Canton: Magny-le-Désert
- Commune: Écouché-les-Vallées
- Area^{1}: 5.24 km^{2} (2.02 sq mi)
- Elevation: 171 m (561 ft)
- Highest elevation: 200 m (660 ft)
- Lowest elevation: 153 m (502 ft)
- Population (2023): 92
  - Density: 18/km^{2} (45/sq mi)
- Time zone: UTC+01:00 (CET)
  - Summer (DST): UTC+02:00 (CEST)
- Postal code: 61150
- ^{1} French Land Register data, which excludes lakes, ponds, glaciers > 1 km^{2} (0.386 sq mi or 247 acres) and river estuaries.

Saint-Ouen-sur-Maire (French pronunciation: [sɛ̃.t‿wɛ̃ syʁ mɛʁ]) is a former commune in the Orne department in north-western France. On 1 January 2016, it was merged into the new commune of Écouché-les-Vallées.

The inhabitants are known as Audoniens and Audoniennes in French.

== Demographics ==
Historical population

Year	Pop.	±% p.a.
1793	248	—
1821	244	−0.06%
1846	305	+0.90%
1872	191	−1.78%
1901	90	−2.56%
1926	85	−0.23%
1946	80	−0.30%
1962	79	−0.08%

Year	Pop.	±% p.a.
1968	93	+2.76%
1975	91	−0.31%
1982	130	+5.23%
1990	129	−0.10%
1999	112	−1.56%
2006	107	−0.65%
2023	92	−0.88%

Source: EHESS (1793-2006) and INSEE (2023)

== See also ==
- Communes of the Orne department
