= Batilly, Orne =

Batilly
- Part of Écouché-les-Vallées
- Location of Batilly
- Location within France Location within Normandy
- Coordinates: 48°43′16″N 0°10′59″W
- Country: France
- Region: Normandy
- Department: Orne
- Arrondissement: Argentan
- Canton: Magny-le-Désert
- Commune: Écouché-les-Vallées
- Area^{1}: 8.99 km^{2} (3.47 sq mi)
- Elevation: 195 m (640 ft)
- Highest elevation: 234 m (768 ft)
- Lowest elevation: 141 m (463 ft)
- Population (2023): 136
  - Density: 15.1/km^{2} (39.2/sq mi)
- Time zone: UTC+01:00 (CET)
  - Summer (DST): UTC+02:00 (CEST)
- Postal code: 61150
- ^{1} French Land Register data, which excludes lakes, ponds, glaciers > 1 km^{2} (0.386 sq mi or 247 acres) and river estuaries.

Batilly (French pronunciation: [batiji]) is a former commune in the Orne department in northwestern France. On 1 January 2016, it was merged into the new commune of Écouché-les-Vallées.

The former commune is part of the area known as Suisse Normande.

== See also ==
- Communes of the Orne department
