= Swingolf =

Family variation of golf

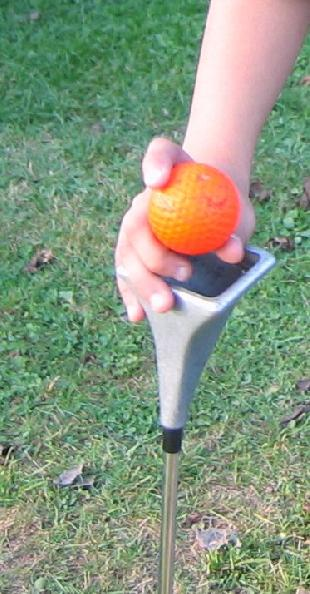
A ball and a swingolf club

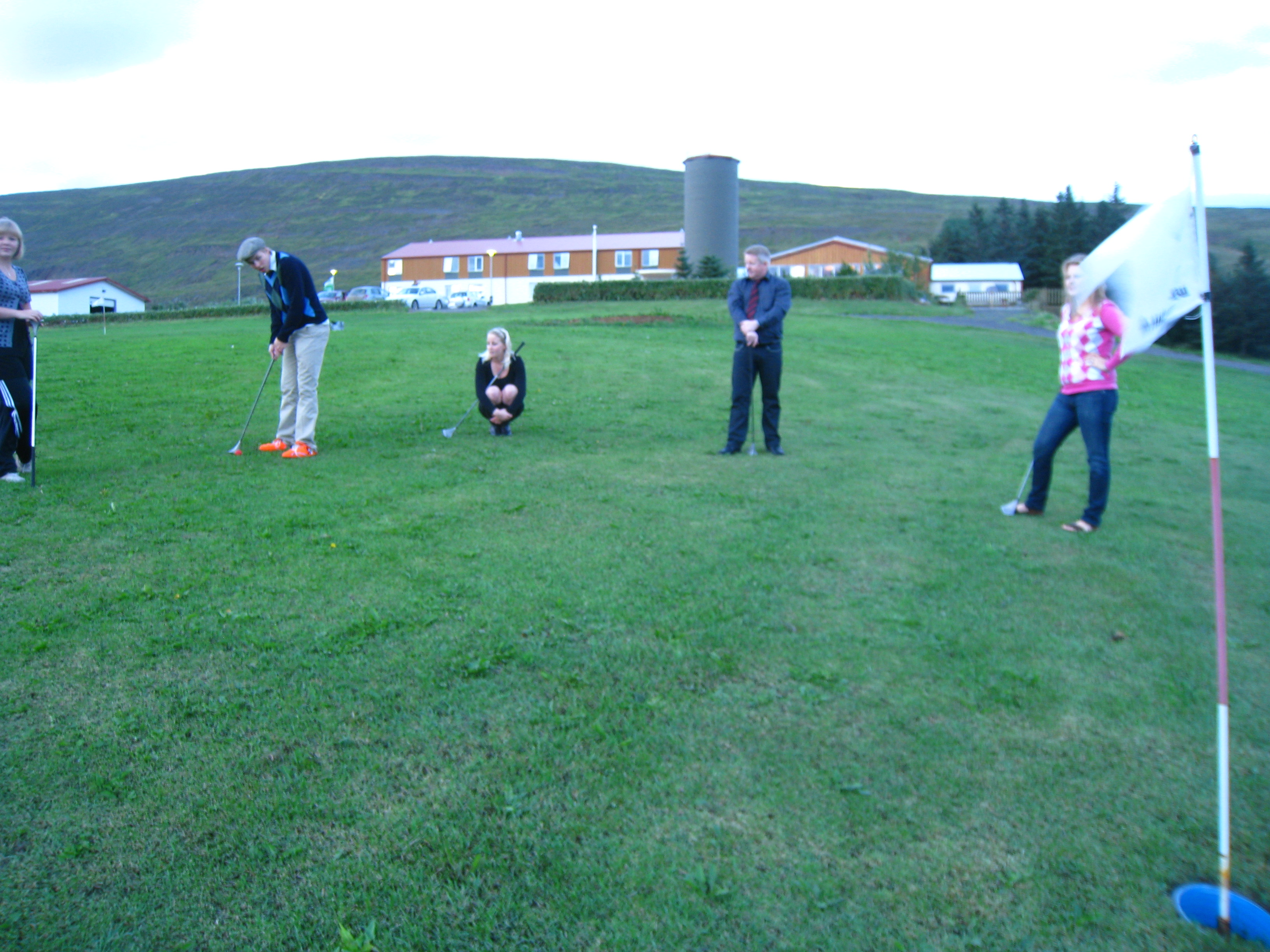
A Swingolf game in Iceland

Swingolf is a family-oriented variation of golf that is played with a single golf club and softer, bigger balls, giving access to inexperienced and young players. This sport is usually played casually, similar to mini-golf, but also has a league. The golf courses are usually less well-kept than normal courses. They are often planted with grass that fits local climate, reducing watering and maintenance and thus reducing cost. This sport is mainly popular in Europe, especially in France, Germany, Switzerland, Austria, and Iceland.

== Differences with Golf ==
- The fees to play Swingolf are usually much lower, ranging from €8 to €15 for an adult per game.
- It can be played by kids starting at 8 years old and family without prior experience after a 10 minute introduction.
- The balls, bigger than golf and made of soft polymeric foam, reduce the risk of injuries or damage in case of impact.
- The game is played with a single club that is usually lent, reducing the hassle to carry several clubs.
- The course is much smaller than usual golf course and is ranging from 30,000 to 90,000m^{2}.
- The course is usually less kept than traditional golf, reducing maintenance cost and water usage.
- Due to the less kept course, ball trajectory might be less predictable.
- The range is shorter due to the bigger and softer ball to about 150–200 meters for a strike. Swingolf is easier than golf for kids.

== History ==
Swingolf was created in 1982 by Laurent de Vilmorin and mainly expanded in western Europe in countries where golf is expensive.
