= Petites Cités de Caractère =

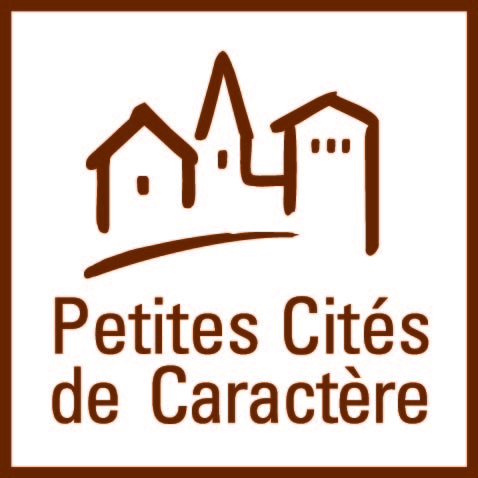
Logo of Petites Cités de Caractère

Petite Cité de Caractère is a label awarded to towns or villages that meet a set of criteria as set by the Petites Cités de Caractère de France. As of 2021 there are more than 200 communes listed as a Petite Cité de Caractère.

== History ==
The label was created in Brittany in 1976 by Jean-Bernard Vighetti, a Breton geography professor, worried about the decline of France's heritage, particularly the heritage of small towns in the country, which were in decline during the 1960s, as people and industry moved to larger cities. In 1979 the label then spread to other neighbouring areas, with the label being used in the Lot-et-Garonne and Landes. In 2009 a national Charte de Qualité, which formalised the criteria and objectives, was established.

== Criteria ==
To be classified as a Petite Cité de Caractère the commune must

- be subject to protection as a Historic Monument, or a Remarkable Heritage Site.
- have a population of less than 6,000 inhabitants.
- must have a sufficiently dense building to give it the appearance of a city, have a quality and homogeneous architectural heritage witness to its history, have exercised and/or exercise central urban functions.
- must have a multi-year program for the restoration and rehabilitation of built heritage and the enhancement of tangible and intangible heritage.
- must be part of the tourism development strategy of its territory.
