= Château de la Motte =

Building in Joué-du-Plain, France

Coordinates: 48°41′8″N 0°8′18″W

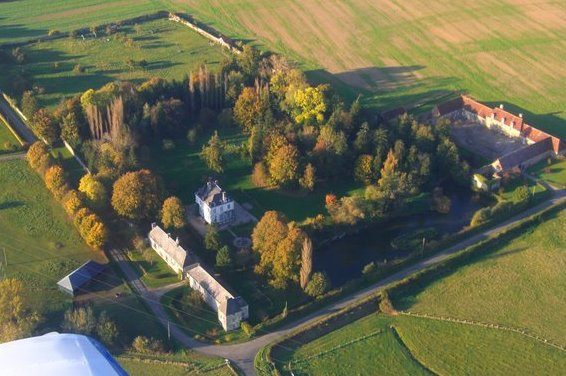
Aerial view of Chateau de la Motte looking north.

Château de la Motte is a chateau located in the commune of Joué-du-Plain (Orne) in Normandy, France. The chateau began as a Viking motte-and-bailey castle and evolved into the 18th- and 19th-century chateau seen today. The two most noted families who owned the site were the Gabriel de Montgommerys and the Nicolas Angos, but its role as a Resistance center in World War II may be its most notable episode.

Long established Norman chateaus, like Château de la Motte, usually originate from motte-and-bailey castles constructed during the earliest Norman period in the 10th and 11th centuries. The bourgeois Ango family built much of Château de la Motte in the late 16th and early 18th century. They bought the original chateau from one of the most noted names in Normandy: the descendants of Gabriel de Montgomery I (Montgommery). In 1559, Montgomery had accidentally killed King Henry II of France in a joust.

Château de la Motte sits at the end of a long chestnut tree alley or avenue linking to the commune of Joué-du-Plain and the village of Écouché. The chateau's former farm, with an arched entry and coat-of-arms may have been the original chateau built in the 1660s. Today's chateau and a number of buildings have dates from the early 1820s, after restorations from the Deschamps family following the French Revolution.

In the Second World War, the chateau operated as a dairy and holiday home for Paris prostitutes, as well as an arms depot for the Resistance. The discovery of the depot by the Germans led to the assassination of the local mayor, and an unresolved crime, the subject of two criminal investigations and one book.

== Name, water sources and first historic mention ==
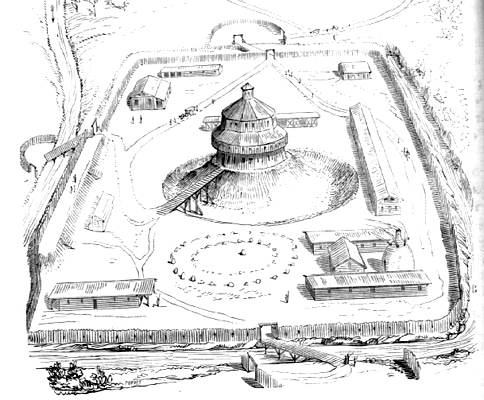
19th-century rendition of a motte-and-bailey castle

Château de la Motte takes its name from the small-forested rise next to the current house, called a motte ("clod of earth" in Old French). The small mound is the remains of a Viking/Norman motte-and-bailey castle (motte castrale, motte féodale in Old French). Mottes were made throughout France and Europe from the 10th century until the early 13th century, with many sites carrying the title of La Motte, Les Mottes, Forêt de la Motte, or Château de la Motte.

=== Site and water sources ===
Mottes often sat on Roman villa sites because water sources and strategic location needs were the same in both eras. Although numerous villa ruins were found nearby with the recent A88 autoroute construction, it is unknown whether this site was occupied before the Vikings, absent archaeological excavation.

The Chateau's site, including orchard and farm, has seven sources of water. Like most chateaus and mottes, this was likely the main consideration for the location. Wells and water management were important from earlier times as most drinking sources were contaminated, and sufficient water for animals was critical, even in rain-soaked Normandy. Water pollution was a known source of sickness from antiquity onward, although poorly understood.

In the 15th century, when chateaus lost their defensive function, moats fulfilled prestige and aesthetic roles as well as providing fishponds, an important source of protein for peasants.

=== First historic mention ===
The first mention of Château de la Motte is a letter from Guillame Lesor in 1217, asking to be a vassal of the French King. This letter followed the loss by King John of England (1199–1216) at the Battle of Bouvines in 1214, forcing an English withdrawal from Normandy.

== Evolution ==
The first motte and bailey forts were built to defend Viking/Norman power in Normandy, as the lords of Maine in the south, and Brittany, to the west, occasionally intruded in force. The river Orne was the southernmost Norman boundary for much of the 10th century, and was defended by a series of mottes, usually in groups.

Motte-and-bailey castles usually had two main parts, both surrounded by wet or dry moats, then a wooden palisade. First constructed was the motte, or earthen mound, that was topped by a wooden tower. The tower was a last defense in an attack, and sometimes the lord's residence. The bailey contained barns, barracks, blacksmithy, chapel and other support structures. A removable wooden bridge linked the tower to the courtyard and a single fortified gate welcomed the visitor crossing the moat.

The motte may have been similar to one excavated nearby at Land de Goult, near Carrouges. Archeologists uncovered a lower court 50–80 meters (55–87 yd) across. The motte was 40–60 metres (130–200 ft) across at the base, with a flattened top for the tower 10–20 metres (33–66 ft) high and 15–20 metres (49–66 ft) wide at the top.

After William the Conqueror's death, his sons revived motte making in the area to consolidate power from nearby Château de Falaise and Argentan. Lords continued building motte and bailey castles in the region throughout the ongoing feudal anarchy, until the mid-12th century. Thus, Château de la Motte may have originated close the letter's date of 1217.

=== Tower and circle walls ===
In the 11th century a large stone tower (fr.grosses tour, grande tour, or tour maîtresse) was sometimes built over a water source, and the support buildings lined inside were attached to its circular wall. Stone for these structures would have been fieldstone and not cut; however, much of the structures may have been wood, or wattle and dab, not stone. Like mottes, most exterior wooden walls would have been coated in plaster to reduce fire worries, and making them resemble stone buildings.

=== Fortified farm ===
Château de la Motte, like most small chateaus, was most probably little more than a farm, possibly fortified during the Middle Ages. The king, or the duke of Normandy, had to give permission for building fortifications; towers, moats, and crenellations required licenses. Instead, rural architecture evolved a defensive function with buildings in compounds, built around a courtyard with water. The exterior walls had few windows, with an easy-to-defend entrance.

Careful orientation toward the south, like most country architecture in France, was moderated on the Atlantic coast, in order to block the storms from the southwest. Today's gatehouse or dependence protects the chateau from the weather as well. The walls surrounding the grounds created microclimates, as well as defense, as intended. The rooftops deflect the winds upward, away from the residence.

The lord's dwelling would have been a modest structure from the 11th to 16th centuries, even if the home were referred to as a Great Hall (la grande salle). The home would have at least two levels with storage on the ground floor and a large public room (l'aula) on the first floor, which was the actual great hall. This hall would have been a judicial, political, and economic center for the community, or parish (now commune), and located near the entrance to the chateau grounds. A lord's private chamber (la camera) would have been at one end, with true privacy only in the large curtained bed. The chapel (la capella) was typically near, or in, the home, but no site is known today.

Regardless of the construction, probably no comfortable home existed at Château de la Motte until the 17th century. King Henry IV visited the region in 1579, and stayed in an inn five kilometers away in Écouché, because there was no place suitable for him nearby.

With the inspiration of Versailles, châteaux de chasse (hunting chateaus/lodges) became popular as country retreats, with the hunt as the theme. These chateaus featured grand architecture, beautiful gardens, select majestic and exotic trees, greenhouses (orangeries) for luxuriant smells and spices, and grand entrances. A Google Earth view of the chateau reveals an ancient hedge-line, or tree alley, leading from the current Chateau's gates to the Forest of la Motte (bois de la motte).

The existing majestic lime trees (tilleul) near the house and ponds may have been originals or descendants of those planted by previous lords as limes gave prestige and the grandeur of shade. Traditionally they were often planted in the courtyards center as symbols of high justice.

== Lords, owners and major events ==
Norman nobility originated as loyal friends and family of William the Conqueror. In turn, their knights and retainers became minor nobles (la petite noblesse), usually barons, which filled out the need for local authority and management. Early Château la Motte lords probably were among these nobles.

The known owners are taken from the original charter, which existed at the time of the writing of the book, Histoire du bourg d'Écouché by Alfred de Caix in 1867.

- 1217 - domain of Guillaume Lesor, first known use of the chateau's name in a letter requesting vassalage to King Philip II of France, after the John, King of England (1199–1216) lost the Battle of Bouvines in 1214 and withdrew from Normandy.
- 1357 – Nearby Argentan burned and pillaged by the English during the Hundred Years' War.
- 1417 - September 21 letter from Fralin de la Motte asking for the protection of the French king. This was probably the result of King Henry V's second invasion of Normandy in July 1417, and the fall of nearby Caen on September 8. The region remained under English control until 1449. Note: in Old French, fralin is a term meaning a farmer of a large parcel of land.
- 1553 – Catherine Lelievre left Château de la Motte to her daughter Françoise, who married Balthazar de Villers and they had a daughter Louise.
- 1554, 1586 and 1588 – The Black Death and several Protestant armies ravaged the region during the Wars of Religion.
- 1570 – Louise Balthazar married Jean de Bouquetot du Breuil-sur-Touque (1541–1611) They had a daughter Suzanne de Bouquetot.
- 1589 – Argentan supported the Catholic "Ligue", but the bourgeois opened the city gates to King Henry IV of France, a moderate and occasional Protestant.
- 1593 - Suzanne married Gabriel de Montgommery II (1565–1637) in Caen. Montgommery was Lord of Lorges and Courteilles (Eure), and with the wedding he became the Baron of Écouché. Gabriel II, like his more famous father, had been a commander of Huguenot(Protestant) armies operating throughout Normandy. His primary family chateau was at Ducey, near Mont Saint-Michel. A treaty in 1576 forgave Montgommery, and he stopped all military activity before his marriage.
- 1638 – The second Black Death struck down half the population of Argentan.
- 1641 – Jaques de Montgommery, son of Gabriel III, inherited Château de la Motte.
- 1654 – Catherine Cochon, from Château d'Almeneches, and the widow of Nicolas Ango, bought Château de la Motte from Jaques de Montgommery.
- 1655 – Jean (or Jacques), one of the seven Ango children married Marie Le Fèver de Lézeau and bought four partial fiefs in Joué-du-Plain. The Chateau was then called La Motte – Lézeau, the name found on the Cassini Map.
- 1700s - Golden Age of Argentan. The town boasted 66 noble families and 3 royal lace manufacturers.
- 1790 The French Revolution – Population stagnated at 6000 people and no industry. Only 40 noble families remained. Normandy took neither side strongly during the upheaval.
- 1791, April 15 - Jean-Baptiste IV Ango sold the domains to Louis-Omer-Félicité Marquis d'Estampes for 620,000 francs. In 1793, d'Estampes was on the list of lords who left the country to escape the Revolution and the Reign of Terror (1789–1793).
- 1819 – Louis-Charles-David Deschamps (1802–1865) bought Château de la Motte and his family resided there. His daughter married Eugene Gabriel de Champrepus (1828–1892). Their son Andre inherited the chateau, never married and died at the start of World War II.
- 1939 - Honoré Noel, owner of a café clos, or house of prostitution, in Paris bought the chateau from Andre Champrepus's nephew. The chateau was used as country holiday home for Noel's employees, the farm was rented out to a local animal dealer, the buildings were rented to a Paris suburb for a school, and the dependencies were leased to a dairy, which became the center for the Resistance in the area. The Chateau was also the distribution center for food and gas coupons both during and after the War, until 1950. Germans occupied the chateau's farm in the final months before the Liberation in August 1944.

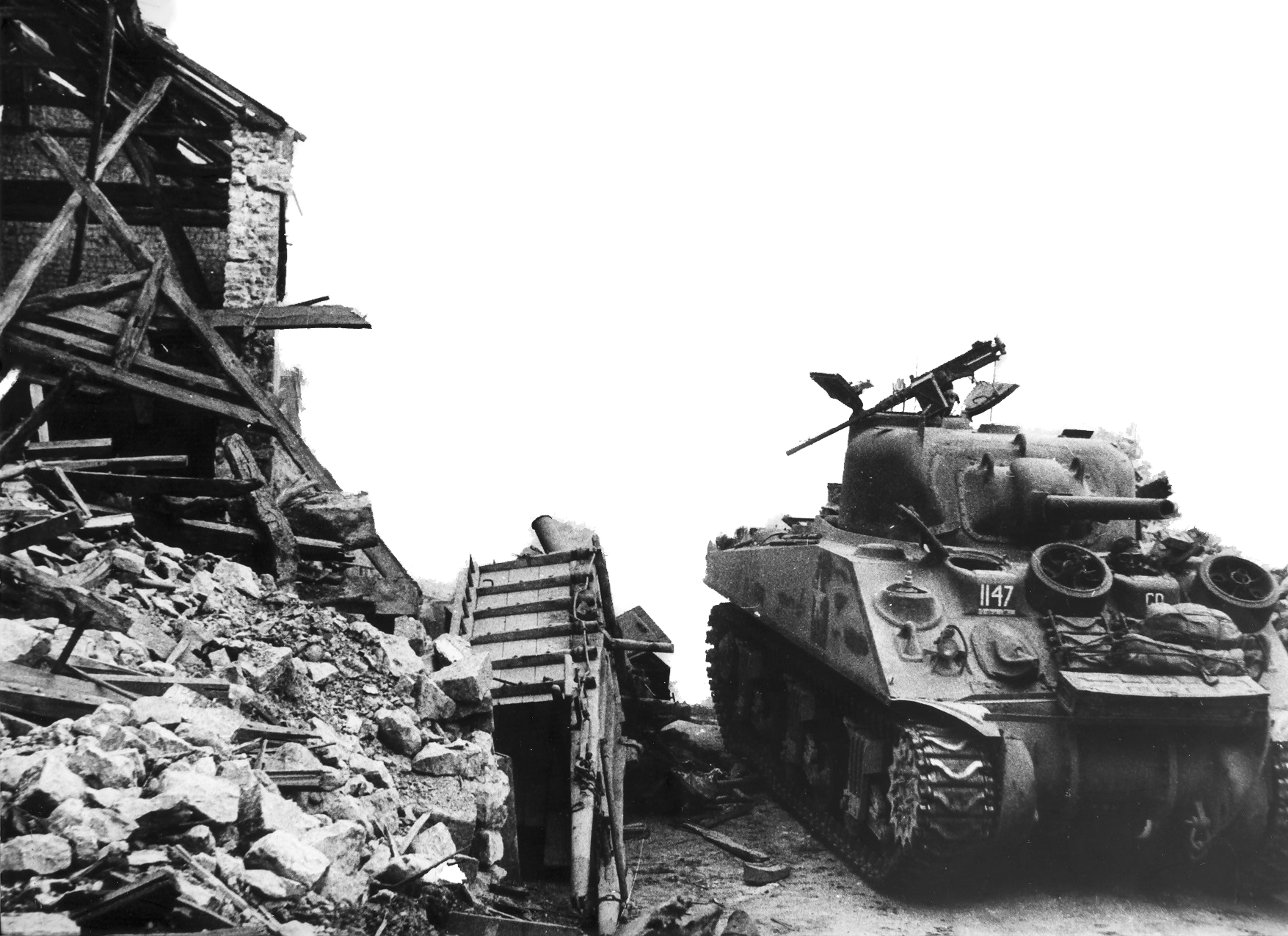
Free French troops used a Sherman tank in street combat in Écouché

- 1944 June 6 – August 14– Bombing and street combat destroyed 15% of Écouché and 85% of Argentan.
- 1968 – Peugeot executive M. Faure and his wife bought the chateau.
- 1988 – Rhoisin Beresford, Irish film director and former wife of Australian film director Bruce Beresford, bought La Motte and began restoration. The chateau farm was sold to the former guardian M. Boin, and the orchard was sold to a Dutch businessman.
- 2014 – The current owner purchased the main chateau.

=== Gabriel de Montgommery II ===
The most famous owner of the Château de la Motte was Gabriel de Montgommery II, who acquired the chateau by marriage. His father, of the same name, was the commander of the Scottish Guard; he accidentally killed King Henry II of France in a jousting tournament.

The tragedy occurred during a joust celebrating the Peace of Cateau-Cambrésis treaty with the Habsburgs, which ended the Italian War of 1551-1559, and a marriage of the king's daughter. Gabriel de Montgommery I (1530–1574) killed the King Henry II of France when Montgommery's splintered lance sheared through the King's helmet visor and thrust into his face.

The King took 10 days to die, and although Montgommery was pardoned twice from the King's deathbed, he fled the country.

The young King's death shook Europe, and made the reputation of the prognosticator Nostradamus, whose recent words seemed to foretell the event.

CI, Q 35 The young lion shall overcome the older one,
on the field of combat in single battle.
He shall pierce his eyes in a golden cage,
Two forces one, then he shall die a cruel death."

The top sentence was actually added much later, but the last two lines attracted the popular attention.

Montgommery converted to Protestantism in England. Ironically, his job as commander of the Scottish Guard in France was to search out Huguenots (French Protestants), as well as protect the King's life. He returned to France to lead numerous military campaigns in the Wars of Religion for the Protestants. His son, Gabriel de Montgommery II, and eventual owner of Chateau de la Motte, also became a Protestant commander, before and after his father's capture at a siege at Domfront and subsequent beheading.

Gabriel de Montgommery I, became a romantic figure linked to a book attributed to Alexander Dumas, The Two Dianas; a French movie; and the Tour Montgommery at Paris’ Conciergerie, where Queen Marie Antoinette was imprisoned before being guillotined.

The son, Gabriel II was forgiven in the treaty of 1576, before his marriage to Suzanne de Bouquetot in 1593, daughter of the Baron of Écouché. He thus became the lord of Château de la Motte.

The Montgommerys probably did not build at La Motte, but visited the area often, and possibly had a home in Écouché, which still exists.

=== Nicolas Ango ===
A year after Nicolas Ango's death (1654) his widow bought Chateau de la Motte and began building the farmhouse. Numerous other properties in Joué-du-Plain were also purchased, such as the nearby 16th-century manor Haut Mesnil, in order to fulfill the requirements of the acquiring the title of Marquis. Nicolas couldn’t attain the title himself, it went to his son, Jean-Baptist after the requisite amount of land was purchased. The title stayed with whoever owned the land afterward.

These titles were referred to as Lords of the Robe, as opposed to the old aristocracy, like Montgommery, who were called Lords of the Sword, who often had titles dating back to William the Conqueror.

Nicolas Ango was a wealthy bourgeois, and a Counselor to the King. The family had already built the private mansion hotel particulier, across from St. Germain Church in Argentan.

Purchase of the title marquisat brought income to the depleted royal treasury of Louis XIV, but Jean-Baptist Ango earned the King's favor by buying and closing the Huguenot temple property in Joué-du-Plain. Louis XIV had begun the unpopular process of enforcing the law of making every Christian become a Catholic. Ango's action saved the King an unpleasant job.

Jean-Baptist Ango married Marie LeFevre of Lezeau, daughter of Nicolas Le Fevre, advisor to the Parliament of Rouen. On the 18th century Casini map, Marquis de la Motte- Ango was the chateau's title.

The Ango source of wealth was unclear; he may have been a lawyer. Many new-rich rose rapidly as merchants, financiers, lawyers, and doctors during the Hundred Years' War and Wars of Religion, because many male aristocrats had died. Louis XIV chose his most trusted servants from among the rising bourgeois and small nobles; two examples were Vauban for fortifications and Colbert for finances. Bourgeois were usually defined as professionals who did not work with their hands.

New lords, like the Angos, revived the ideals of country life. Jean-Baptist Ango built what would be the main residence around 1700, and probably the remainder of La Motte's buildings and walls.

The son, René-Phillipe de la Motte-Ango, married Antoinette de Dame Pellevé Flers. He became the Lord of Château de Flers after the premature deaths of her two uncles; the first uncle from a duel and the second from a horse-fall. The imposing granite Château de Flers is near the town center, and open to the public. Through skillful management, the Fler branch of the family became one of the wealthiest in France.

Jean Baptiste Ango IV sold the chateau just before the beginning of the French Revolution. A letter from Voltaire declined the ownership of the chateau in place of payment of a debt of only a 1000 écu in 1758. The letter said the lands had been poorly managed and systematically pillaged by the local peasants.

== French Revolution and the 19th century ==
During the Revolution, like most chateaus, it was probably pillaged but not burned, as portrayed in popular imagination. No useful records survive from the time. Normandy was not strongly partisan during the period. An interim manager sold off stone from the main house to nearby farms.

In 1820 the prominent Deschamps family bought the chateau and built the existing home, dated at 1821-22. The barn and the orchard house have similar dates chiseled over the entrances, indicating substantial reconstruction by the family.

André Champrepus, the grandson of the original Deschamps, remembered as poor, portly and single, was the last Marquis. He died at the outbreak of the Second World War. Locals recall visiting the body presented in the chateau's tower, and the nephew paying all the communes taxes that year, a custom among the nobility from the Middle Ages.

== Second World War ==
Honoré Jean Noel bought the chateau as a retreat for his employees. He owned a ‘’café clos’’, or house of prostitution, in Paris. The enterprising Noel with his wife and family lived at the chateau, and they rented out the farmland with most of the buildings. Locals recall him bringing his young women there for short breaks "to get a tan". He provided ponies and carts for the employees to explore the chateau's grounds. Locals referred to him as Père Noel, and they recall his Provençal accent along with a Madame Julos, a loud, tattooed woman that was a permanent member of the family.

Noel leased the two dependences to a dairy to Jacques and Yvonne Bachelier. The couple occupied the winter quarters of the chateau owners, the apartments closest to the chateau home itself. The dairy employees lived above the dairy's stables.

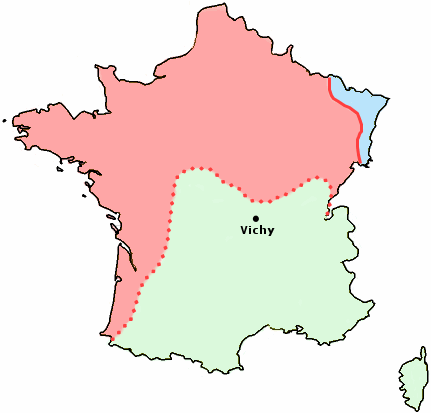
France zonelibre blank

Emile Buffon, a well liked local man who soon became mayor of Joué-du-Plain rented the chateau's farm. Mayors had the delicate jobs of negotiating between German demands and local resentments. Buffon, an animal dealer, had to gather the farm animals of local farmers for the German army, as agreed to in the treaty of the French defeat.

Buffon sublet the farmhouse to a boarding school for Coulombs, Seine-et-Marne, as about 20 girls age 8 to 14, attended school. The girls were safe from bombings and ate well.

=== Resistance ===
Chateau de la Motte was an arms depot for the Resistance, but its discovery by the Nazis led to local mayor Emile Buffon being accused of collaboration and assassinated.

On the day of the mayor's assassination, 16 July, just before dawn, a German Messerschmitt Bf 109 fighter crashed into the large pond at Château de la Motte, killing pilot Haibt Oswald. In that same dogfight, Canadian Michael O'Kelly was a casualty from Britain's Royal Air Force. He is the only Allied soldier in the graveyard at Écouché.

The Allies under General George S. Patton approached from the south, but the German occupiers continued local oppression, by managing a withdrawal across the Rhine to mount a final defense.

After finding the arms depot, the Germans occupied the chateau with soldiers living in the farmhouse and officers in the main house. The Germans installed a bakery on the chateau farm grounds.

Noel continued distributing rationing coupons for several years after the war, as shortages continued. Noel's son and some of the female employees followed the Allied armies into Germany. The girls' school closed and the schoolmistress left, to rejoin her German boyfriend in Germany.

== After the Second World War ==
In 1974, Fauvre, a Peugeot engineer bought La Motte along with his wife and their son.

In 1986, after Fauvre's death, Rhoisin Beresford, an Irish film director and the former wife of Bruce Beresford bought the chateau from the son. Beresford was a noted director of Driving Miss Daisy and Terms of Endearment. Because of her media links, numerous British notables passed through la Motte, including the heroine in the movie The Messenger: The Story of Joan of Arc starring Milla Jovovich, filmed in nearby Sées.

On December 26, 1999, the chateau suffered major tree damage from the Lothar Storm. The majority of the remaining heritage trees (with the notable exception of the lime trees) from the 18th-century Chateau planting were lost.

In 2014, the current owner bought La Motte.

== Gallery ==
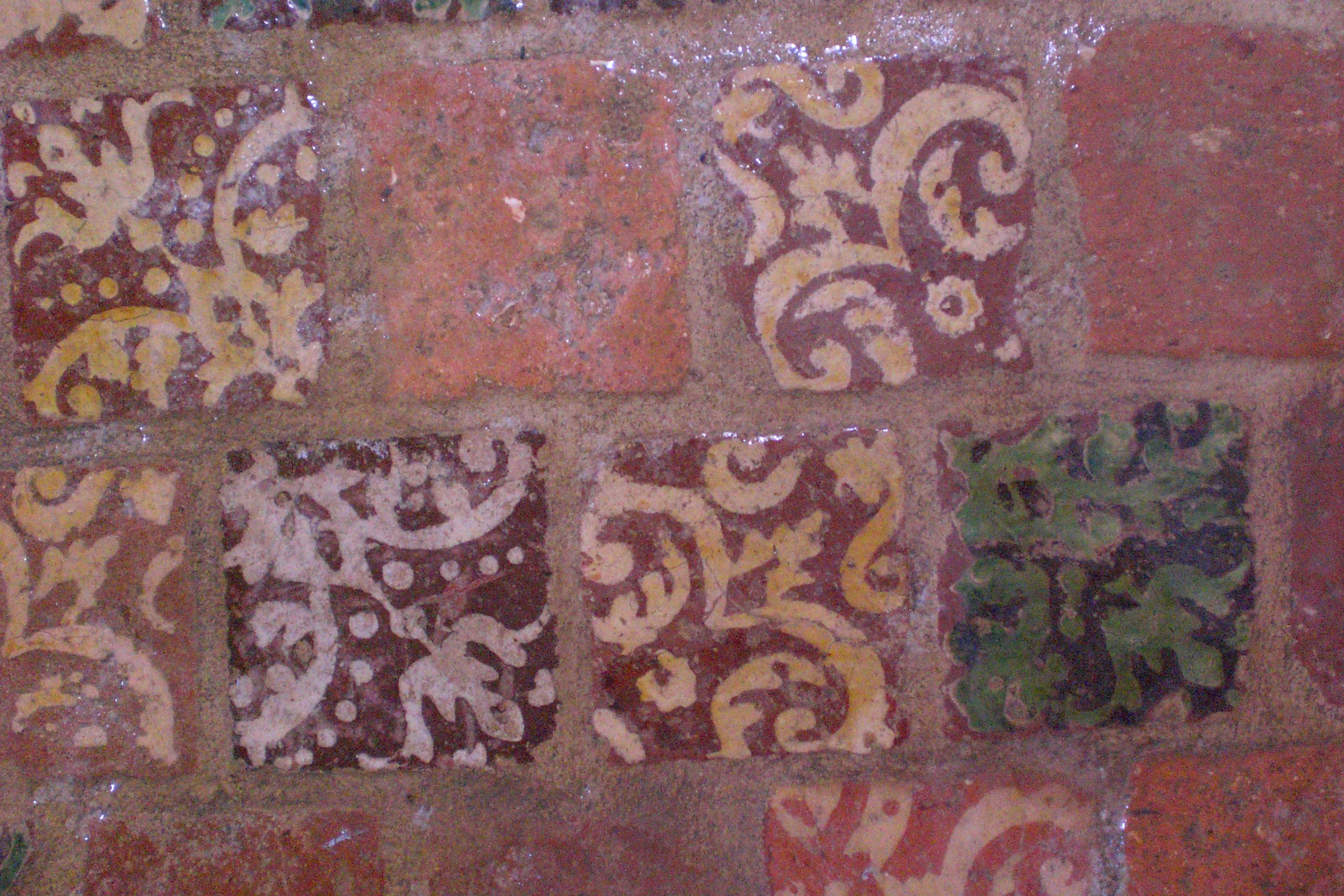
Medieval tile

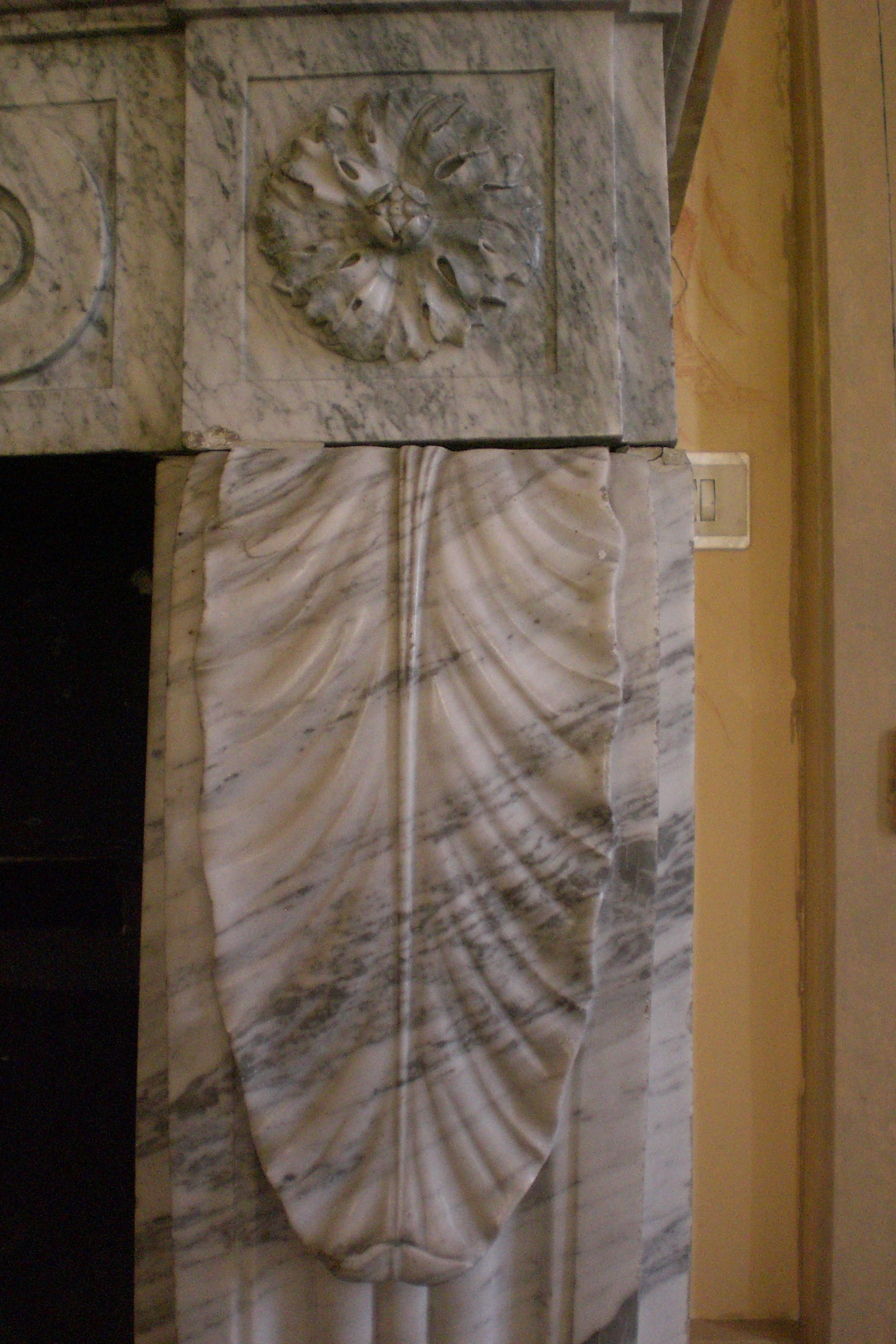
Fireplace mantel detail

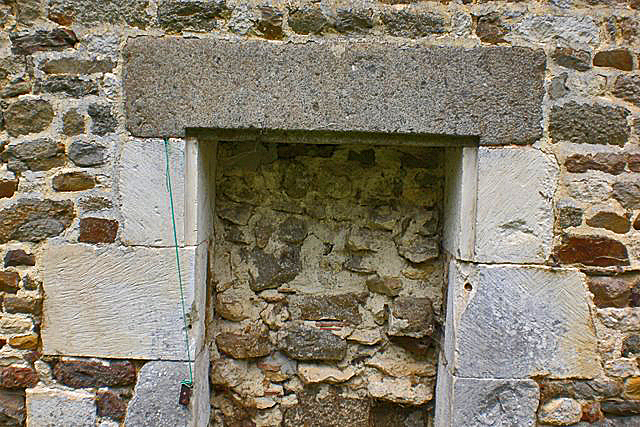
Unusually fine barn doorway

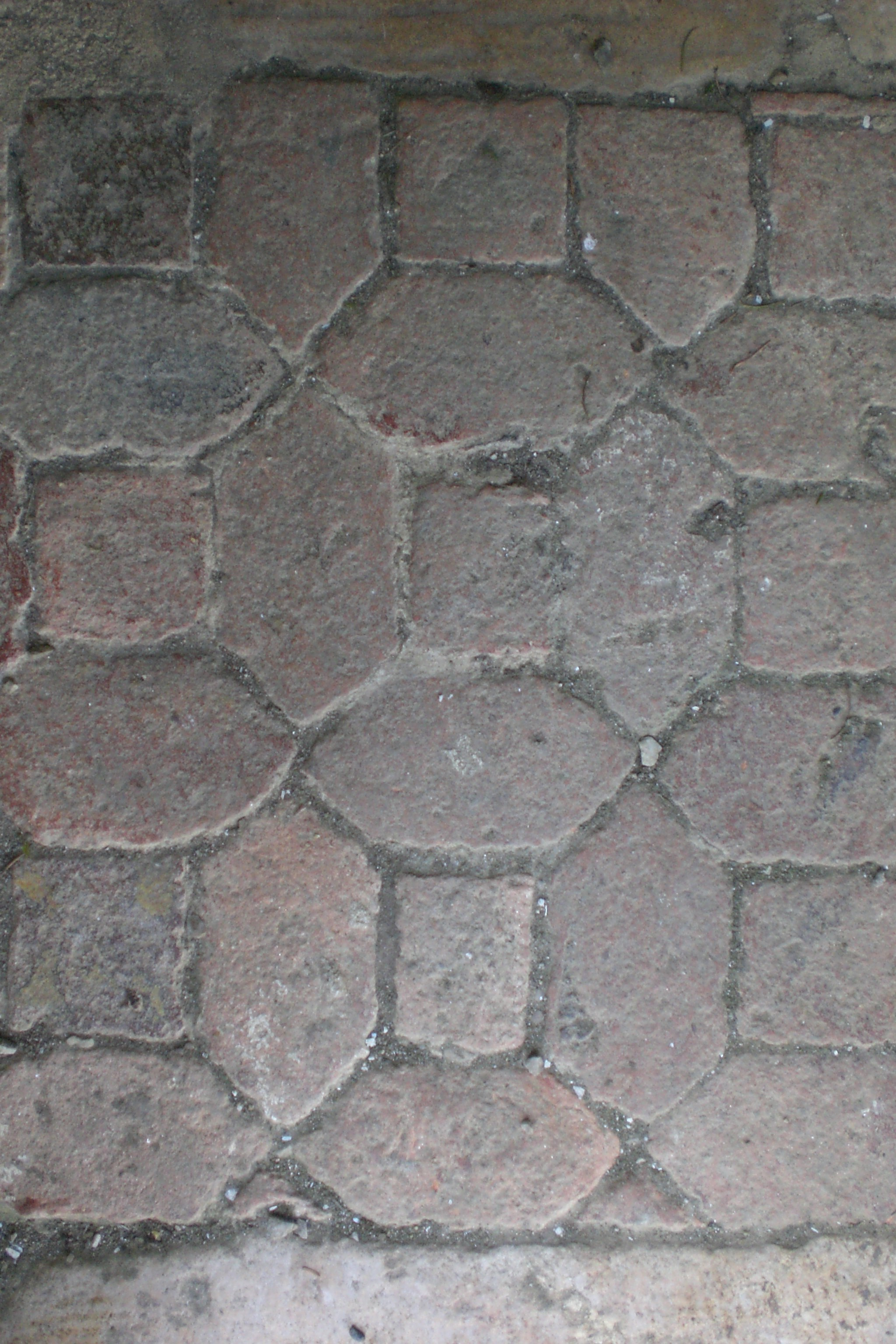
Tile from Orangerie

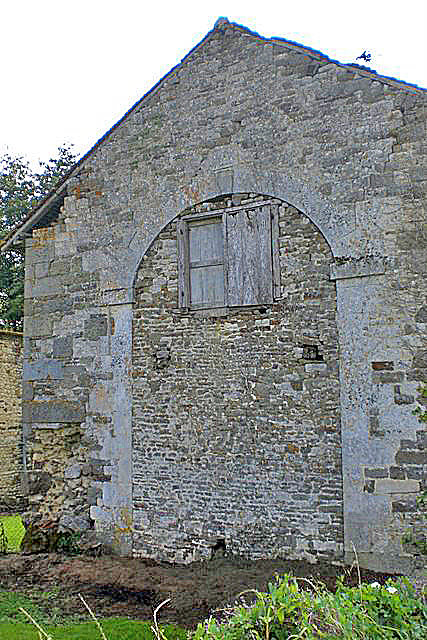
Barn door

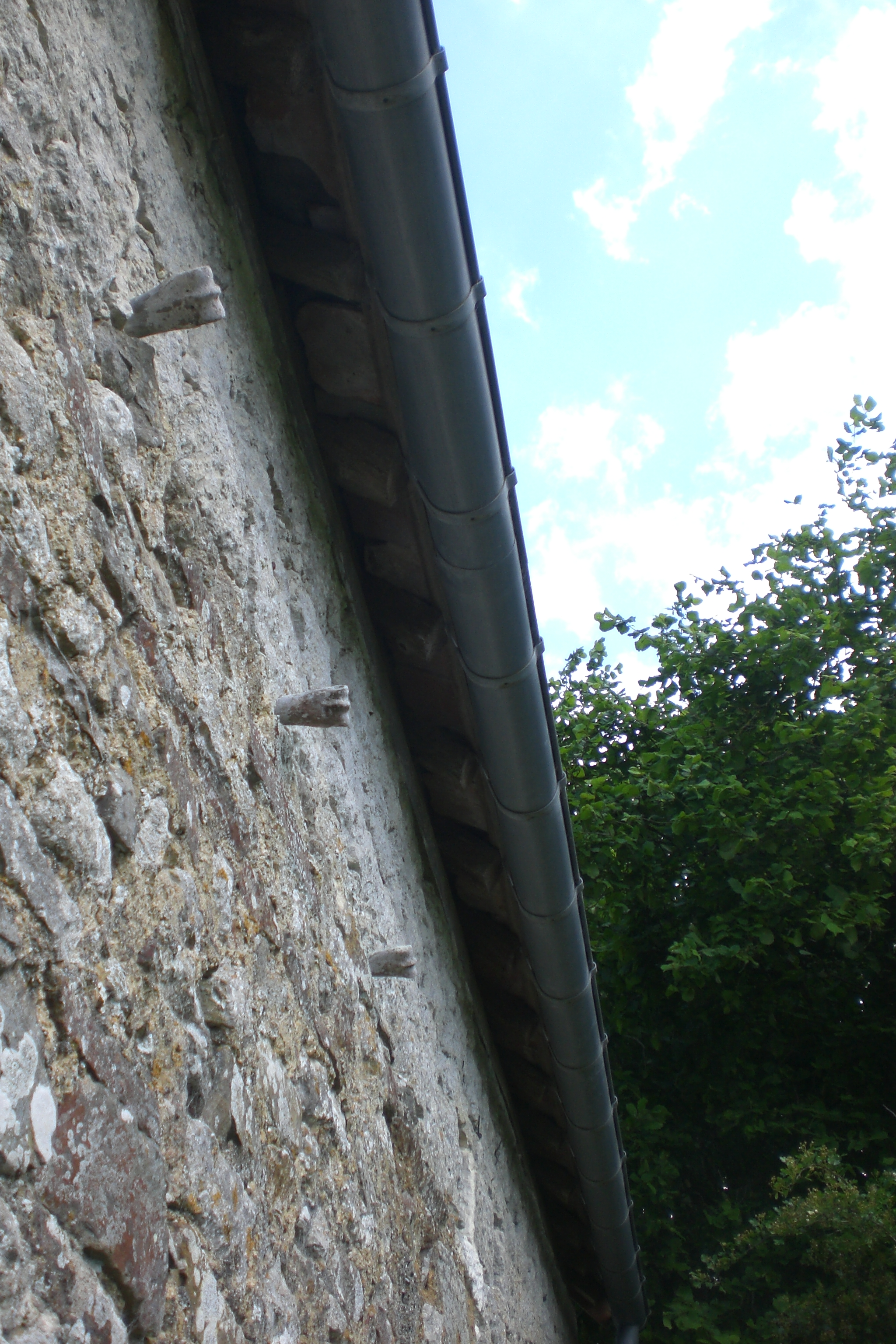
Wall of sheep bones

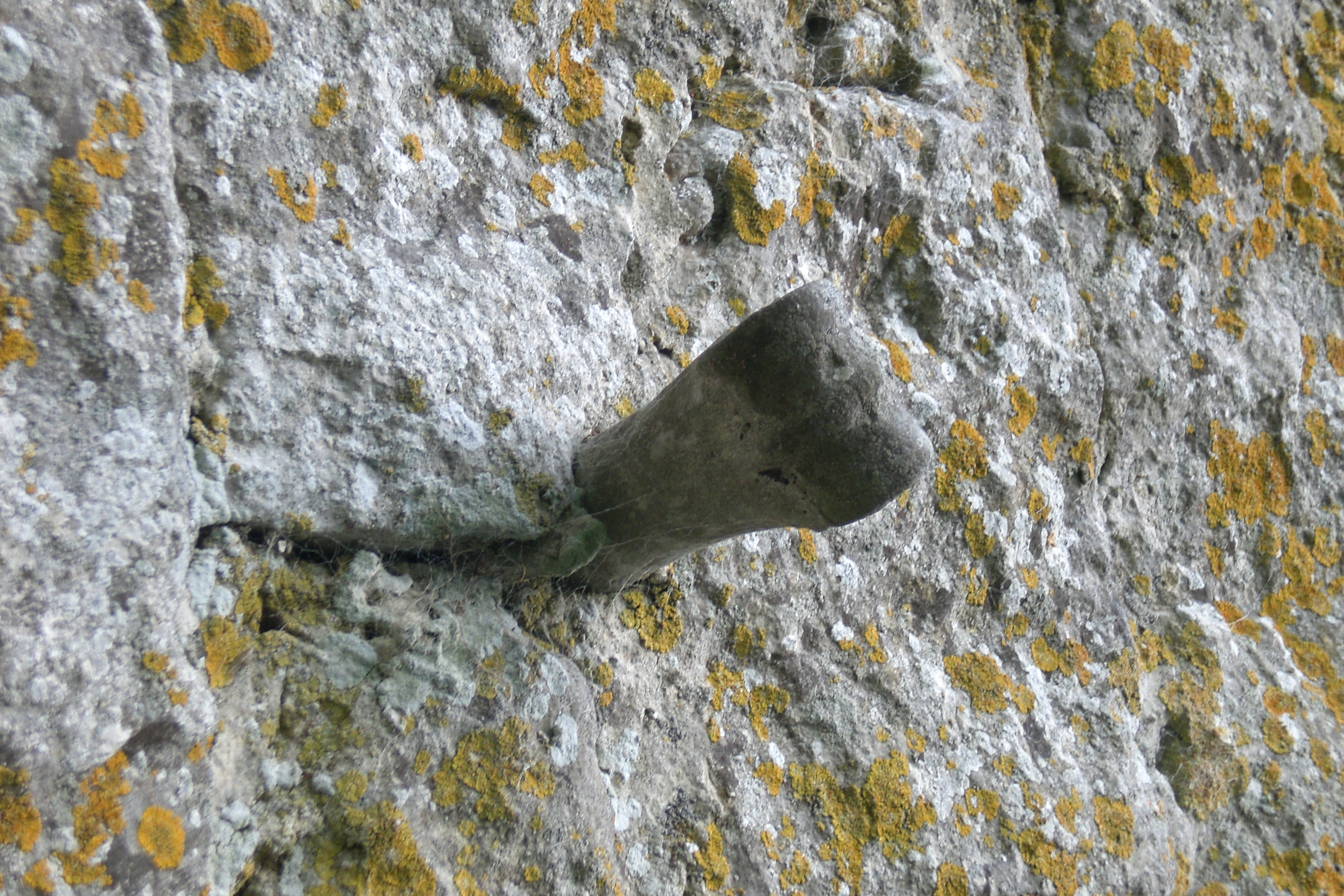
Sheep bone imbedded in the wall for supporting grape vines. Normandy formerly made poor vineyards. The bones were used instead of wood or iron because wood rotted and metal rusted and stained the stone; bone didn't discolor the stone and did not rot.
