= Longuenoë =

- Part of L'Orée-d'Écouves
- Location of Longuenoë
- Location within France Location within Normandy
- Coordinates: 48°31′06″N 0°04′02″W
- Country: France
- Region: Normandy
- Department: Orne
- Arrondissement: Alençon
- Canton: Magny-le-Désert
- Commune: L'Orée-d'Écouves
- Area^{1}: 4.44 km^{2} (1.71 sq mi)
- Elevation: 255 m (837 ft)
- Highest elevation: 297 m (974 ft)
- Lowest elevation: 214 m (702 ft)
- Population (2022): 105
  - Density: 23.6/km^{2} (61.2/sq mi)
- Time zone: UTC+01:00 (CET)
  - Summer (DST): UTC+02:00 (CEST)
- Postal code: 61320
- ^{1} French Land Register data, which excludes lakes, ponds, glaciers > 1 km^{2} (0.386 sq mi or 247 acres) and river estuaries.

Longuenoë is a former commune in the Orne department in north-western France. On 1 January 2019, it was merged into the new commune L'Orée-d'Écouves.

== Commune borders ==
The commune is surrounded by:

- Saint-Didier-sous-Écouves to the north
- Livaie to the west
- La Roche-Mabile to the south
- Saint-Ellier-les-Bois to the east.

== Demographics ==
Historical population
Year	Pop.	±% p.a.
1821	345	—
1962	115	−0.78%
1968	87	−4.54%
1975	85	−0.33%
1982	93	+1.29%
1990	85	−1.12%
1999	110	+2.91%
2022	105	−0.20%
Source: EHESS INSEE

== See also ==
- Communes of the Orne department
- Parc naturel régional Normandie-Maine
