= Rouperroux =

- Commune
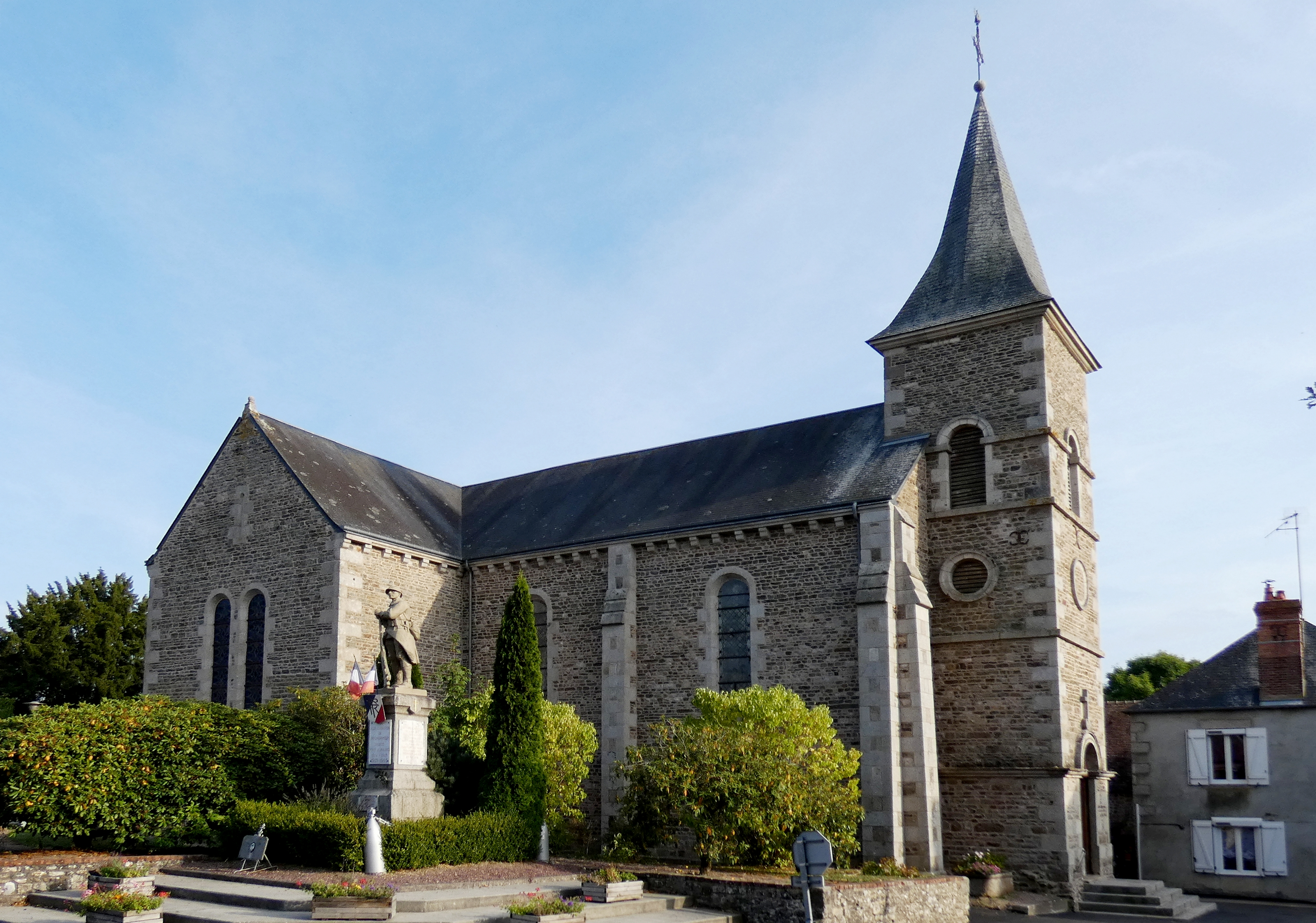
- Location of Rouperroux
- Location within France Location within Normandy
- Coordinates: 48°32′55″N 0°05′03″W
- Country: France
- Region: Normandy
- Department: Orne
- Arrondissement: Alençon
- Canton: Magny-le-Désert
- Intercommunality: Pays fertois et Bocage carrougien

Government
  - Mayor (2020–2026): Roland Sellos
- Area^{1}: 9.78 km^{2} (3.78 sq mi)
- Elevation: 280 m (920 ft)
- Highest elevation: 399 m (1,309 ft)
- Lowest elevation: 239 m (784 ft)
- Population (2023): 174
  - Density: 17.8/km^{2} (46.1/sq mi)
- Time zone: UTC+01:00 (CET)
  - Summer (DST): UTC+02:00 (CEST)
- INSEE/Postal code: 61357 /61320
- ^{1} French Land Register data, which excludes lakes, ponds, glaciers > 1 km^{2} (0.386 sq mi or 247 acres) and river estuaries.

Rouperroux (French pronunciation: [ʁupɛʁu]) is a commune in the Orne department in north-western France.

== Geography ==
The commune is made up of the following collection of villages and hamlets, Le Plessis, Rouperroux and La Geslinière.

The commune is within the Normandie-Maine Regional Natural Park and Forêt d'Écouves.

The Commune along with another 11 communes shares part of a 5,255 hectare, Natura 2000 conservation area, called the Vallée du Sarthon et affluents.

The Sarthon river flows through the commune. In addition a stream, ruisseau de brûlon flows through the commune.

== Notable buildings and places ==
=== National heritage sites ===
- Markers of Forêt d'Écouves a set of 80 markers positioned in the 18th century that mark the boundaries of the forest, they were registered as a Monument historique in 1987.

== See also ==
- Communes of the Orne department
- Parc naturel régional Normandie-Maine
