= Condé-sur-Sarthe =

- Commune
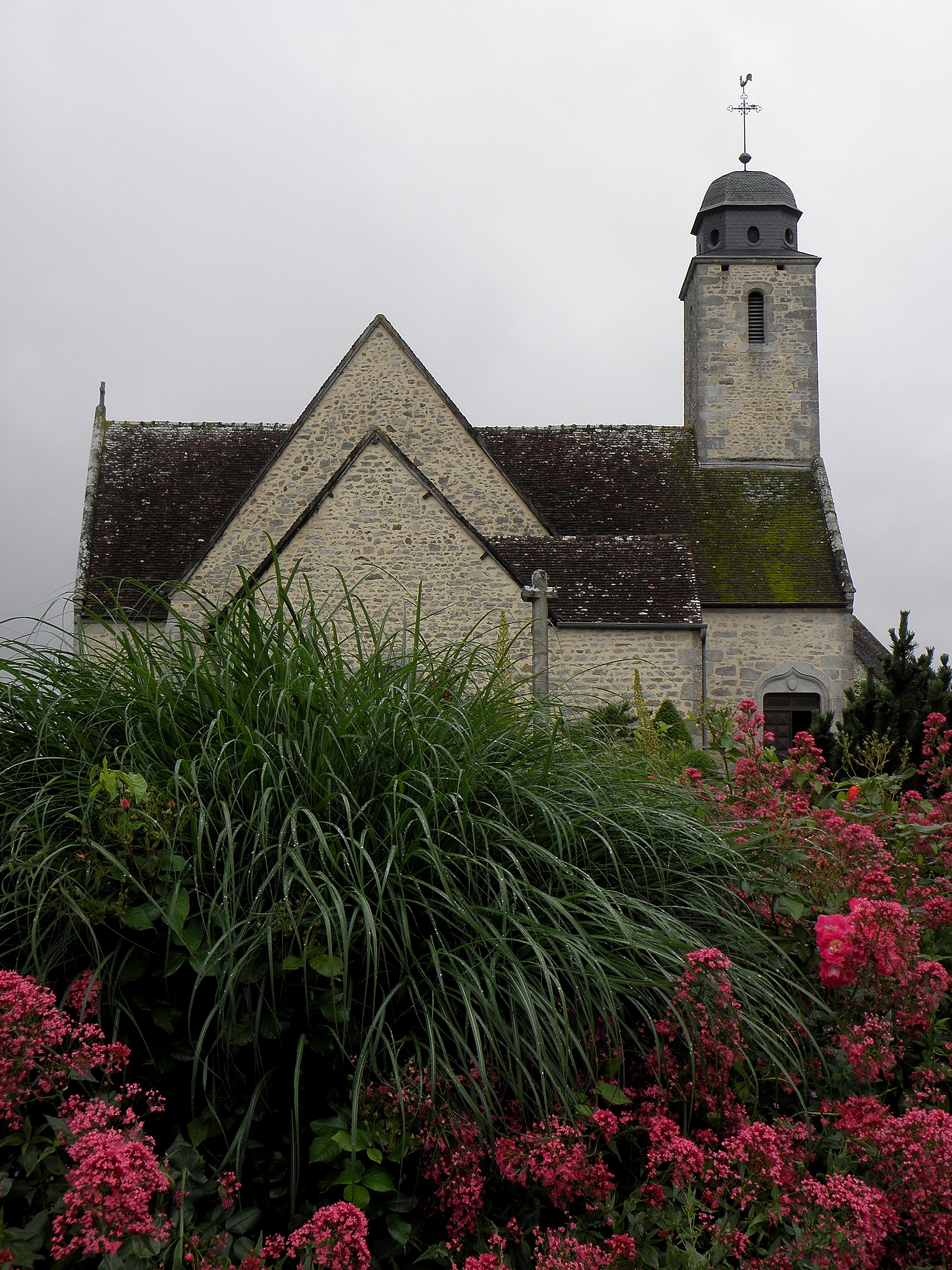
- The church in Condé-sur-Sarthe
- Location of Condé-sur-Sarthe
- Location within France Location within Normandy
- Coordinates: 48°25′58″N 0°02′06″E
- Country: France
- Region: Normandy
- Department: Orne
- Arrondissement: Alençon
- Canton: Damigny
- Intercommunality: CU d'Alençon

Government
  - Mayor (2020–2026): Anne-Sophie Lemée
- Area^{1}: 9.65 km^{2} (3.73 sq mi)
- Elevation: 200 m (660 ft)
- Highest elevation: 205 m (673 ft)
- Lowest elevation: 147 m (482 ft)
- Population (2023): 2,494
  - Density: 258/km^{2} (669/sq mi)
- Demonym: Condéens
- Time zone: UTC+01:00 (CET)
  - Summer (DST): UTC+02:00 (CEST)
- INSEE/Postal code: 61117 /61250
- ^{1} French Land Register data, which excludes lakes, ponds, glaciers > 1 km^{2} (0.386 sq mi or 247 acres) and river estuaries.

Condé-sur-Sarthe (French pronunciation: [kɔ̃de syʁ saʁt], literally Condé on Sarthe) is a commune in the Orne department in north-western France.

== Geography ==
The commune is made up of the following collection of villages and hamlets, Le Pont Percé, Condé-sur-Sarthe and Beauséjour.

The river Sarthe flows through the commune.

== Population ==
Historical population
Year	Pop.	±% p.a.
1968	1,134	—
1975	1,166	+0.40%
1982	1,745	+5.93%
1990	1,945	+1.37%
1999	2,231	+1.54%
2007	2,149	−0.47%
2012	2,261	+1.02%
2017	2,507	+2.09%
2023	2,494	−0.09%
Source: INSEE

== Points of interest ==
- Centre Pénitentiaire d'Alençon-Condé-sur-Sarthe is a high security prison that was put in use in 2013. It is built on 35 hectares (0.1 sq mi) of land and can house 249 inmates.

== See also ==
- Communes of the Orne department
