= Valframbert =

- Commune
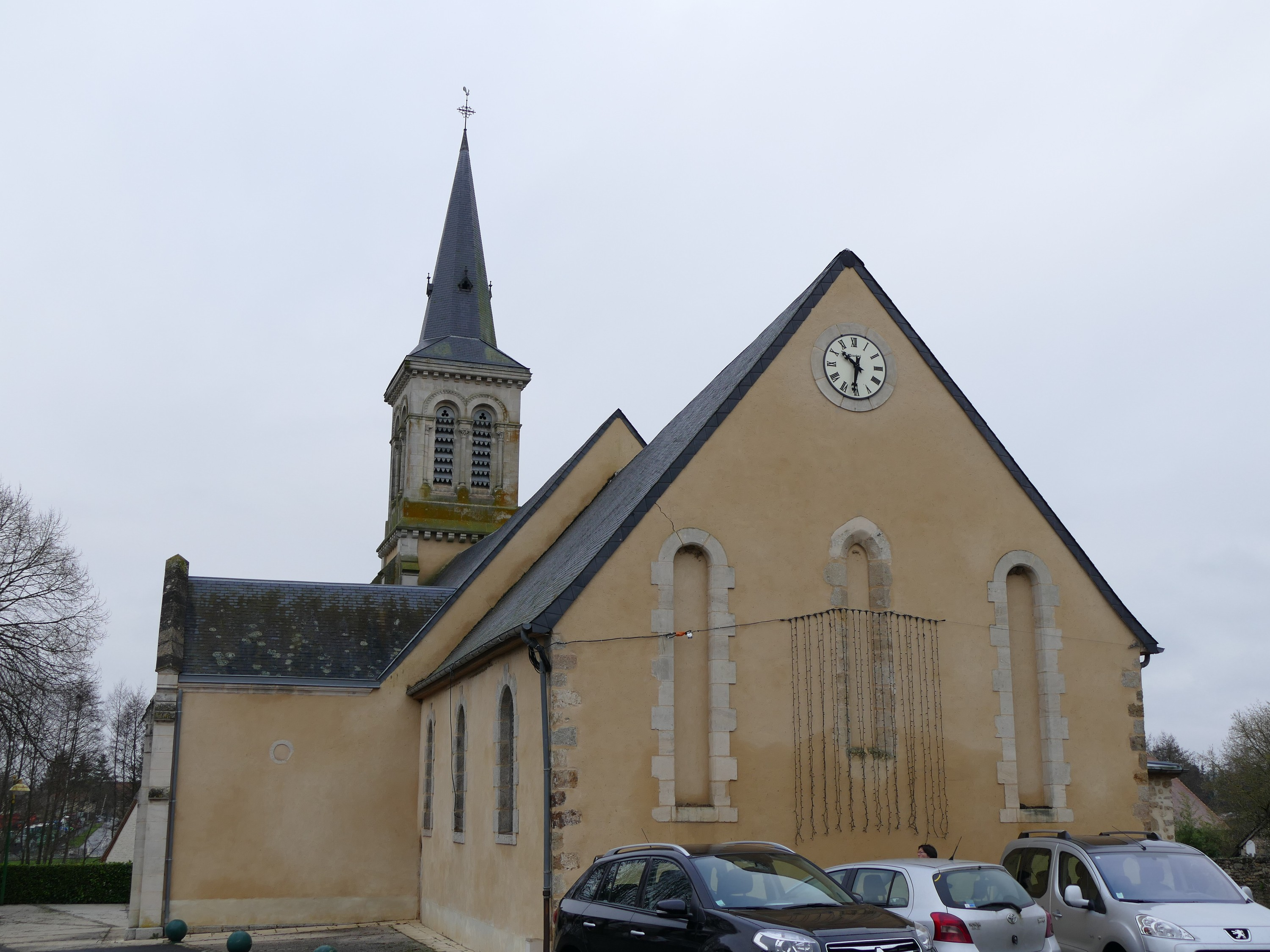
- The church in Valframbert
- Location of Valframbert
- Location within France Location within Normandy
- Coordinates: 48°27′52″N 0°06′32″E
- Country: France
- Region: Normandy
- Department: Orne
- Arrondissement: Alençon
- Canton: Damigny
- Intercommunality: CU d'Alençon

Government
  - Mayor (2020–2026): Francis Aïvar
- Area^{1}: 13.95 km^{2} (5.39 sq mi)
- Elevation: 147 m (482 ft)
- Highest elevation: 179 m (587 ft)
- Lowest elevation: 133 m (436 ft)
- Population (2023): 1,678
  - Density: 120.3/km^{2} (311.5/sq mi)
- Time zone: UTC+01:00 (CET)
  - Summer (DST): UTC+02:00 (CEST)
- INSEE/Postal code: 61497 /61250
- ^{1} French Land Register data, which excludes lakes, ponds, glaciers > 1 km^{2} (0.386 sq mi or 247 acres) and river estuaries.

Valframbert (French pronunciation: [valfʁɑ̃bɛʁ]) is a commune in the Orne department in north-western France.

== Geography ==
The commune is made up of the following collection of villages and hamlets, Vaucelle, Chemoitou, La Dormie, Congé, Valframbert and Les Grouas.

The commune along with another 32 communes is part of a 3,503 hectare, Natura 2000 conservation area, called the Haute vallée de la Sarthe.

The river Sarthe is the sole watercourse that flows through the commune.

== Points of interest ==
=== National heritage sites ===
- Château d'Aché a nineteenth century chateau, it was registered as a Monument historique in 1994.

== Transport ==
- Aérodrome d'Alençon - Valframbert is an Aerodrome within the commune which is also shared with neighbouring communes of Cerisé and Alençon that opened in 1936. Its IATA airport code is XAN and its ICAO airport code is LFOF.
- Aire de La Dentelle à Alencon Normandie is a service station on the A28 autoroute.

== See also ==
- Communes of the Orne department
