= Gandelain =

- Commune
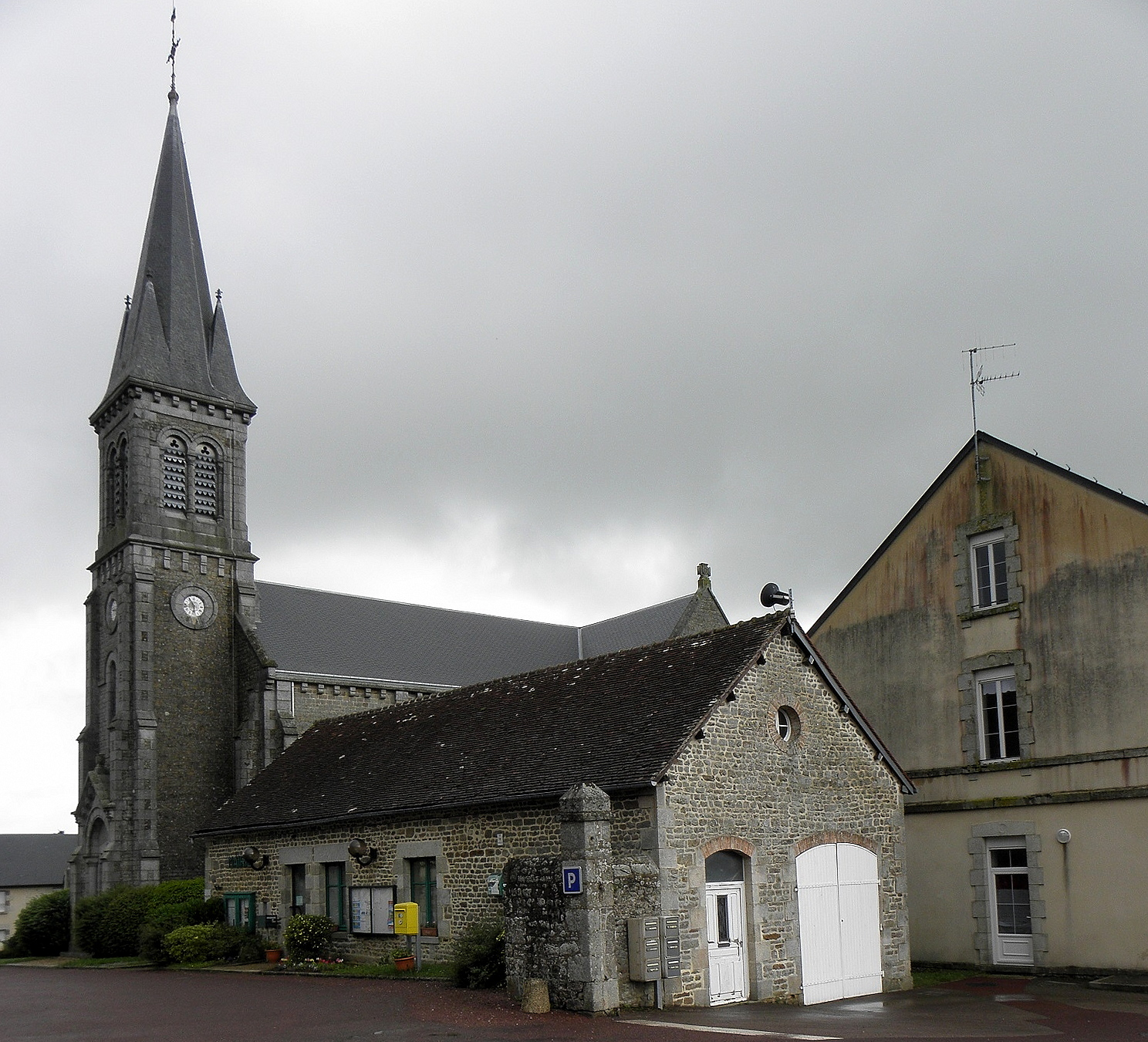
- The town hall and church in Gandelain
- Location of Gandelain
- Location within France Location within Normandy
- Coordinates: 48°28′49″N 0°05′12″W
- Country: France
- Region: Normandy
- Department: Orne
- Arrondissement: Alençon
- Canton: Damigny
- Intercommunality: CU Alençon

Government
  - Mayor (2020–2026): Eric Morin
- Area^{1}: 15.31 km^{2} (5.91 sq mi)
- Elevation: 304 m (997 ft)
- Highest elevation: 370 m (1,210 ft)
- Lowest elevation: 186 m (610 ft)
- Population (2023): 408
  - Density: 26.6/km^{2} (69.0/sq mi)
- Time zone: UTC+01:00 (CET)
  - Summer (DST): UTC+02:00 (CEST)
- INSEE/Postal code: 61182 /61420
- ^{1} French Land Register data, which excludes lakes, ponds, glaciers > 1 km^{2} (0.386 sq mi or 247 acres) and river estuaries.

Gandelain (French pronunciation: [ɡɑ̃dlɛ̃]) is a commune in the Orne department in north-western France.

== Geography ==
The commune is made up of the following collection of villages and hamlets, La Patrie, Beauchevron, Gandelain, La Gottière and La Chauvinière.

The Sarthon river and le Chandon are the two watercourses which flow through the commune.

The commune is in the Normandie-Maine Regional Natural Park.

The Commune along with another 11 communes shares part of a 5,255 hectare, Natura 2000 conservation area, called the Vallée du Sarthon et affluents.

The commune along with 26 others contains part of the Forêt d'Écouves.

== Notable people ==
- Marie-Azélie Guérin (1831 - 1877), mother of Thérèse of Lisieux, and later herself canonized as saint in 2015 was born here.

== See also ==
- Communes of the Orne department
- Parc naturel régional Normandie-Maine
