= Communauté urbaine d'Alençon =

Coordinates: 48.43°N 0.09°E

Alençon
- Communauté urbaine
- Location within the Orne department
- Country: France
- Region: Normandy, Pays de la Loire
- Department: Orne, Sarthe
- No. of communes: {{{nbcomm}}}
- Established: December 1996
- Area: 461.7 km^{2} (178.3 sq mi)
- Population (2018): 55,924
  - Density: 121.1/km^{2} (313.7/sq mi)

The Communauté urbaine d'Alençon is the communauté urbaine, an intercommunal structure, centred on the city of Alençon. It is located in the Orne and Sarthe departments, in the Normandy and Pays de la Loire regions, northwestern France. It was created in December 1996. Its area is 461.7 km^{2}. Its population was 55,924 in 2018, of which 25,775 in Alençon proper.

== Composition ==
The communauté urbaine consists of the following 31 communes, of which 5 (Arçonnay, Champfleur, Chenay, Saint Paterne - Le Chevain and Villeneuve-en-Perseigne) in the Sarthe department:

1. Alençon
2. Arçonnay
3. Cerisé
4. Champfleur
5. Chenay
6. Ciral
7. Colombiers
8. Condé-sur-Sarthe
9. Cuissai
10. Damigny
11. Écouves
12. La Ferrière-Bochard
13. Gandelain
14. Héloup
15. Lalacelle
16. Larré
17. Lonrai
18. Ménil-Erreux
19. Mieuxcé
20. L'Orée-d'Écouves
21. Pacé
22. La Roche-Mabile
23. Saint-Céneri-le-Gérei
24. Saint-Denis-sur-Sarthon
25. Saint-Ellier-les-Bois
26. Saint-Germain-du-Corbéis
27. Saint-Nicolas-des-Bois
28. Saint Paterne - Le Chevain
29. Semallé
30. Valframbert
31. Villeneuve-en-Perseigne
