= Arçonnay =

- Commune
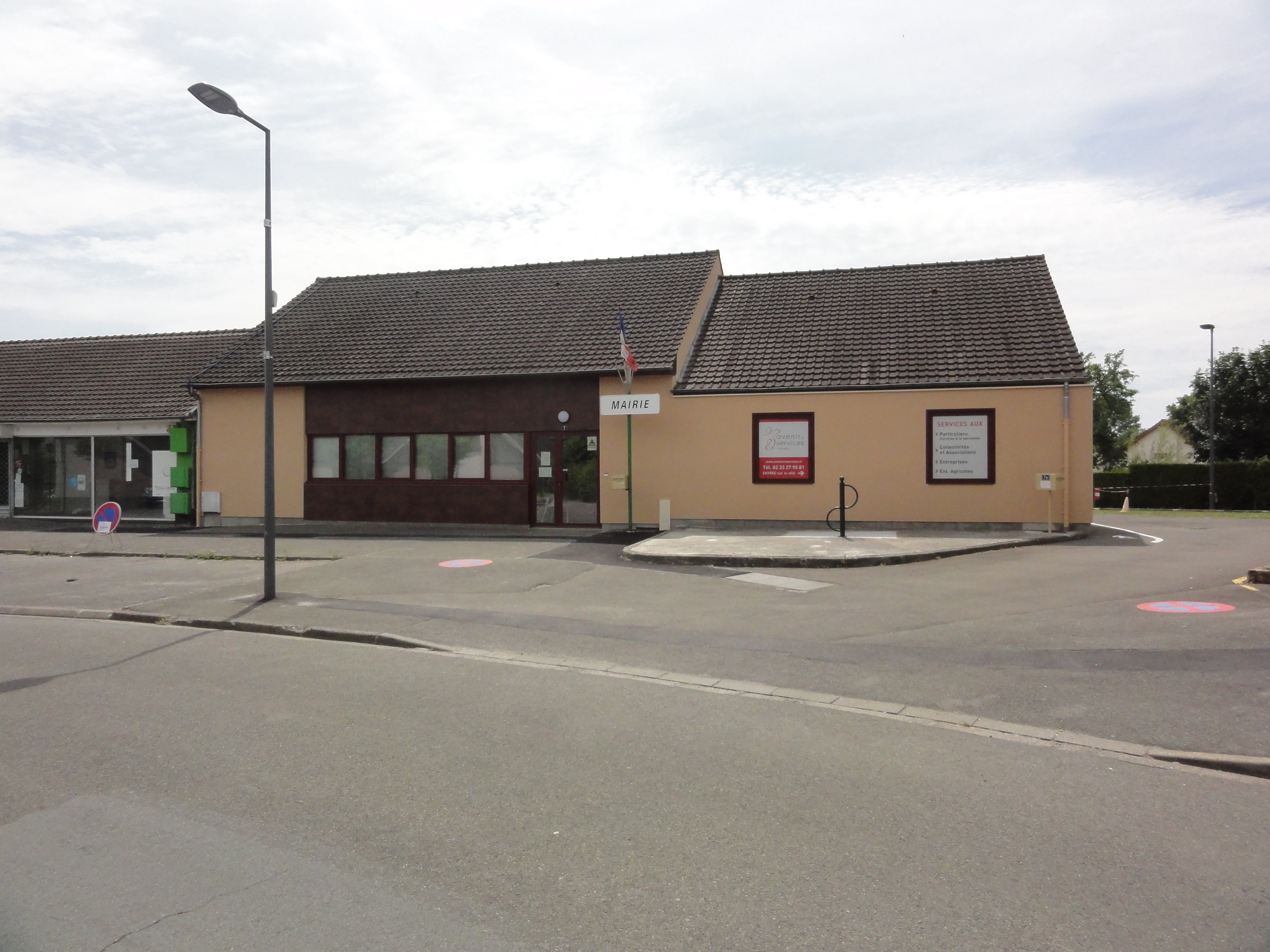
- Arçonnay Town hall

- Coat of arms
- Location of Arçonnay
- Location within France Location within Pays de la Loire
- Coordinates: 48°23′44″N 0°05′11″E
- Country: France
- Region: Pays de la Loire
- Department: Sarthe
- Arrondissement: Mamers
- Canton: Mamers
- Intercommunality: CU d'Alençon

Government
  - Mayor (2020–2026): Denis Launay
- Area^{1}: 7.85 km^{2} (3.03 sq mi)
- Elevation: 144 m (472 ft)
- Highest elevation: 191 m (627 ft)
- Lowest elevation: 133 m (436 ft)
- Population (2023): 1,902
  - Density: 242/km^{2} (628/sq mi)
- Demonym: Arçonnéens
- Time zone: UTC+01:00 (CET)
  - Summer (DST): UTC+02:00 (CEST)
- INSEE/Postal code: 72006 /72610
- Website: www.ville-arconnay.fr
- ^{1} French Land Register data, which excludes lakes, ponds, glaciers > 1 km^{2} (0.386 sq mi or 247 acres) and river estuaries.

Arçonnay (French pronunciation: [aʁsɔnɛ]) is a commune in the Sarthe department in the region of Pays de la Loire in north-western France.

== Geography ==
The commune is made up of the following collection of villages and hamlets, Arçonnay, Le Vieux Bourg, La Grande Tibaudière, Le Petit Maleffre and La Giraudière.

== Sport ==
The commune has a 9 hole golf course, Golf d'Alençon en Arçonnay, which was created in 1994.

== See also ==
- Communes of the Sarthe department
