= Pacé, Orne =

Pacé
- Commune
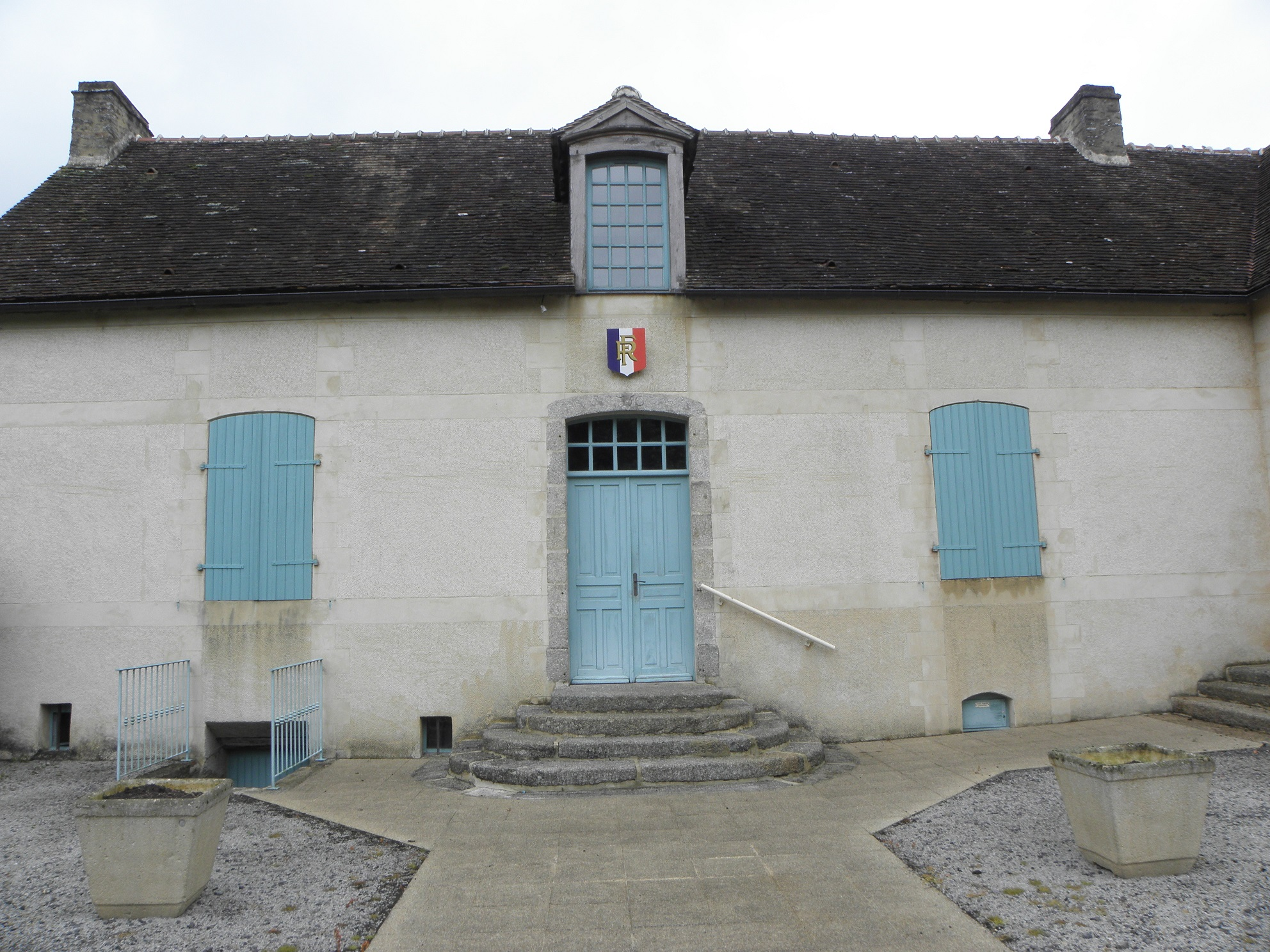
- The town hall in Pacé
- Location of Pacé
- Location within France Location within Normandy
- Coordinates: 48°26′46″N 0°00′10″W
- Country: France
- Region: Normandy
- Department: Orne
- Arrondissement: Alençon
- Canton: Damigny
- Intercommunality: Alençon

Government
  - Mayor (2020–2026): Daniel Bernard
- Area^{1}: 7.56 km^{2} (2.92 sq mi)
- Elevation: 160 m (520 ft)
- Highest elevation: 205 m (673 ft)
- Lowest elevation: 137 m (449 ft)
- Population (2023): 404
  - Density: 53.4/km^{2} (138/sq mi)
- Time zone: UTC+01:00 (CET)
  - Summer (DST): UTC+02:00 (CEST)
- INSEE/Postal code: 61321 /61250
- ^{1} French Land Register data, which excludes lakes, ponds, glaciers > 1 km^{2} (0.386 sq mi or 247 acres) and river estuaries.

Pacé (French pronunciation: [pase]) is a commune in the Orne department in north-western France.

== Geography ==
The commune is made up of the following collection of villages and hamlets, Le Haut-Montrayé, Chauvigny, La Gouvrie, Pacé, La Pommeraie, La Folie and Chahains.

The commune is in the Normandie-Maine Regional Natural Park.

== Population ==
Historical population
Year	Pop.	±% p.a.
1968	306	—
1975	285	−1.01%
1982	252	−1.74%
1990	295	+1.99%
1999	325	+1.08%
2007	376	+1.84%
2012	363	−0.70%
2017	389	+1.39%
2023	404	+0.63%
Source: INSEE

== Points of interest ==
=== National heritage sites ===
The Commune has two buildings and areas listed as a Monument historique.

- La Cour de Pacé Manor a fifteenth century house that was thought to be a Templar house before being converted into an English residence during the Hundred Years' War, it was registered as a monument in 1974.
- Pacé Church a twelfth century church, registered as a Monument historique in 1974.

== Notable people ==
- Éléonore-Aglaé-Marie Despierres (1843 – 1895), was a historian who died here.

== See also ==
- Communes of the Orne department
- Parc naturel régional Normandie-Maine
