= Lalacelle =

- Commune
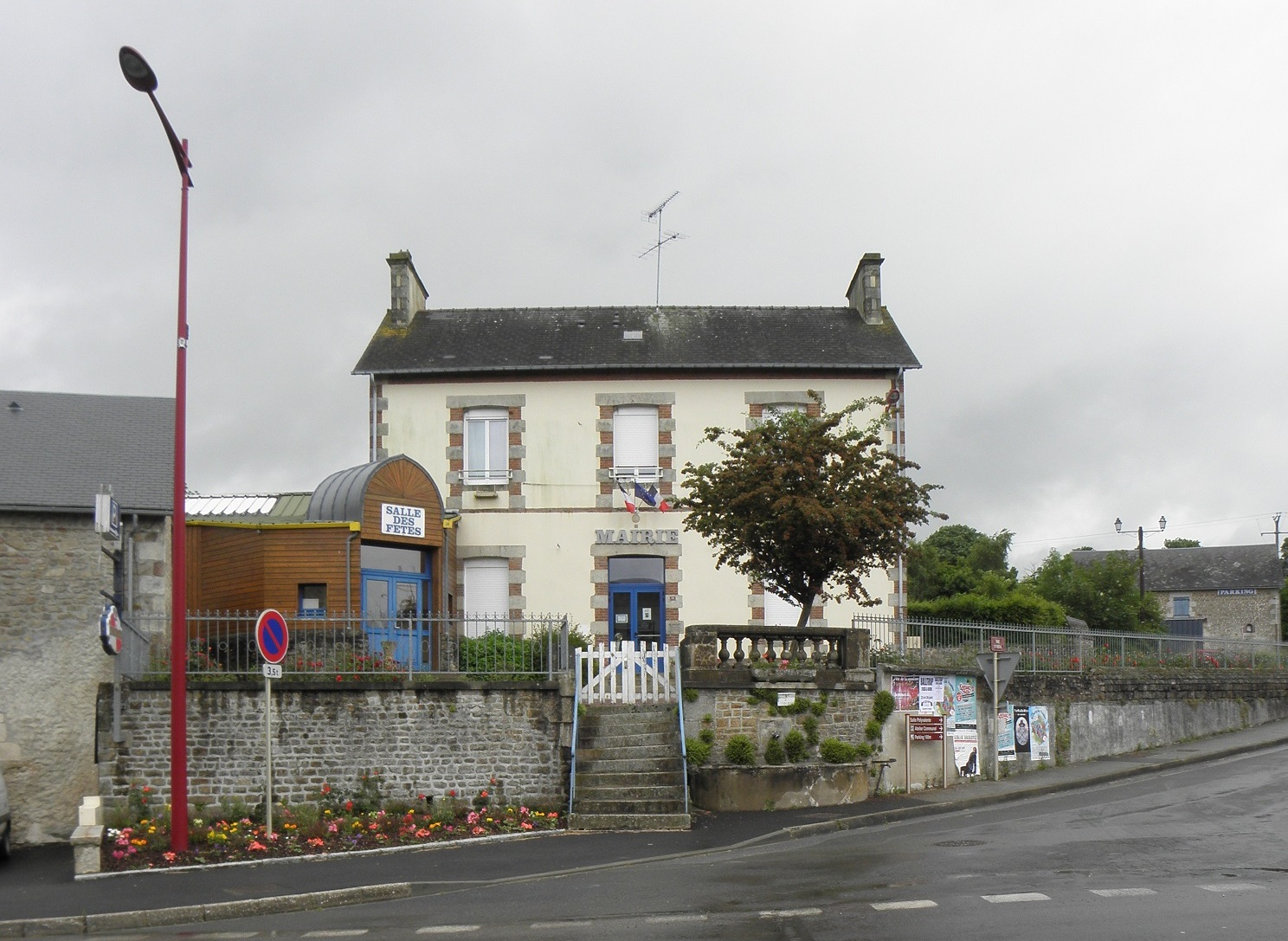
- The town hall in Lalacelle
- Location of Lalacelle
- Location within France Location within Normandy
- Coordinates: 48°28′34″N 0°08′32″W
- Country: France
- Region: Normandy
- Department: Orne
- Arrondissement: Alençon
- Canton: Damigny
- Intercommunality: CU Alençon

Government
  - Mayor (2020–2026): Viviane Fouquet
- Area^{1}: 13.37 km^{2} (5.16 sq mi)
- Elevation: 273 m (896 ft)
- Highest elevation: 389 m (1,276 ft)
- Lowest elevation: 213 m (699 ft)
- Population (2023): 263
  - Density: 19.7/km^{2} (50.9/sq mi)
- Time zone: UTC+01:00 (CET)
  - Summer (DST): UTC+02:00 (CEST)
- INSEE/Postal code: 61213 /61320
- ^{1} French Land Register data, which excludes lakes, ponds, glaciers > 1 km^{2} (0.386 sq mi or 247 acres) and river estuaries.

Lalacelle (French pronunciation: [lalasɛl]) is a commune in the Orne department in north-western France.

== Geography ==
The commune is made up of the following collection of villages and hamlets, Livet, Lalacelle, Lentillère, La Broussette and Les Orjus.

The commune is in the Normandie-Maine Regional Natural Park.

The source of the Mayenne (river) is located in this commune. In addition le Chandon flows through the commune.

The commune, along with 26 others, contains part of the Forêt d'Écouves.

The Commune, along with another 11 communes, shares part of a 5,255 hectare, Natura 2000 conservation area, called the Vallée du Sarthon et affluents.

== See also ==
- Communes of the Orne department
- Parc naturel régional Normandie-Maine
