= Lonrai =

- Commune
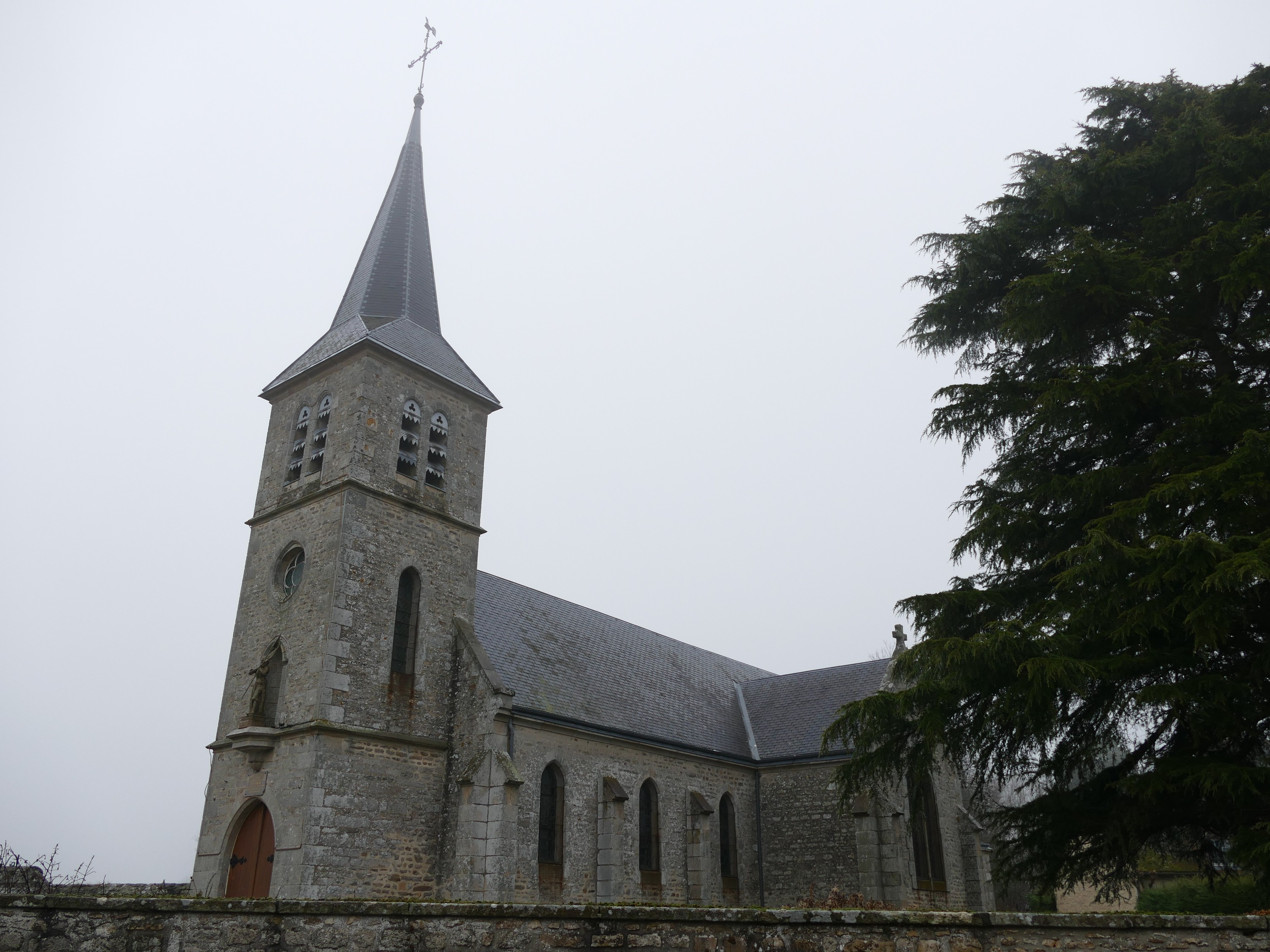
- The church in Lonrai
- Location of Lonrai
- Location within France Location within Normandy
- Coordinates: 48°27′36″N 0°02′22″E
- Country: France
- Region: Normandy
- Department: Orne
- Arrondissement: Alençon
- Canton: Damigny
- Intercommunality: CU Alençon

Government
  - Mayor (2020–2026): Sylvain Launay
- Area^{1}: 6.14 km^{2} (2.37 sq mi)
- Elevation: 160 m (520 ft)
- Highest elevation: 167 m (548 ft)
- Lowest elevation: 141 m (463 ft)
- Population (2023): 1,062
  - Density: 173/km^{2} (448/sq mi)
- Time zone: UTC+01:00 (CET)
  - Summer (DST): UTC+02:00 (CEST)
- INSEE/Postal code: 61234 /61250
- ^{1} French Land Register data, which excludes lakes, ponds, glaciers > 1 km^{2} (0.386 sq mi or 247 acres) and river estuaries.

Lonrai (French pronunciation: [lɔ̃ʁɛ]) is a commune in the Orne department in north-western France.

== History - World War II ==
After the liberation of the area by Allied Forces in August 1944, engineers of the Ninth Air Force IX Engineering Command began construction of a combat Advanced Landing Ground outside of the town. Declared operational on 3 September, the airfield was designated as "A-45", it was used by several combat units until November when the units moved into Central France. Afterward, the airfield was closed.

== Geography ==
The commune is made up of the following collection of villages and hamlets, Lonrai, La Rangée, La Touche, Cuissaye, Beaubourdel, Les Maisons Brûlées, Le Bois Hébert and Montperthuis.

== Points of interest ==
=== National heritage sites ===
- Domaine de Lonrai, the estate was created in the seventeenth century, it was registered as a Monument historique in 1999. The stud farm was built in 1863 by Armand Donon. The grounds also cover the neighbouring commune of Colombiers

== Notable people ==
- Jacques II de Goyon - (1525-1598) a governor and Marshal of France was born here.

== See also ==
- Communes of the Orne department
