= Éléonore-Aglaé-Marie Despierres =

French historian (1843–1895)

- Born: 16 January 1843; Alençon
- Died: November 9, 1895 (aged 52); Pacé
- Occupation: Historian

Éléonore-Aglaé-Marie Despierres (16 January 1843 – 9 November 1895), was a French historian.

Éléonore Bonnaire was born on 16 January 1843 at Alençon. A correspondent of the French Ministry of Education, she published studies on topics related to her hometown, such as the Alençon lace, the Notre-Dame d'Alençon basilica, the history of printing, theater and sculptors of Alençon.

The wife of Lucien, Vincent, Gerasime Despierres, Bonnaire died on 9 November 1895 at Pacé, Orne. A street of her native town of Alençon was named after her in 2007.

== Publications ==
- Alençon lace. trad. Roberta Morgan, Aberdeen, Aberdeen University Press (1987), 207 p. : ill. ; 23 cm. ISBN 978-0-08-034512-3.
- (in French) Commande au XVII^{e} siècle d’un tableau représentant une descente de croix. Paris, E. Plon, Nourrit (1894).
- (in French) Construction du Pont-Royal de Paris (1685-1688), Nogent-le-Rotrou, Impr. de G. Daupeley-Gouverneur (1895).
- (in French) Documents concernant l’église Notre-Dame d’Alençon. Paris, E. Plon et Nourrit (1890).
- (in French) Établissement d’imprimeries à Alençon de 1529 à 1575. Paris, E. Leroux (1894).
- (in French) Histoire du point d’Alençon. Alençon (1882 ; rééd. Paris, Librairie Renouard, H. Laurens ; rééd. Amiens, Res universis, 1989, VIII-276 p.-VIII f. de pl. : ill., couv. ill. ; 21 cm access online. ISBN 978-2-87760-103-0.
- (in French) Le Château de Carrouges (Orne), sa chapelle, ses sculptures au XVII^{e}. Paris, Impr. de E. Plon, Nourrit et Cie (1893).
- (in French) Le Théâtre et les comédiens à Alençon au seizième et au dix-septième siècle. Paris, E. Plon, Nourrit (1892).
- (in French) Les Gabriel recherches sur les origines provinciales de ces architectes. Paris, E. Plon, Nourrit et Cie (1895).
- (in French) Les Orgues de Notre-Dame d’Alençon. Argentan, Impr. du Journal de l'Orne (1888).
- (in French) Menuisiers-imagiers ou sculpteurs des seizième et dix-septième siècles à Alençon. Paris, E. Plon, Nourrit (1892).
- (in French) Origine du point d’Alençon. Alençon, impr. de A. Lepage (1882 ; 1883).
- (in French) Portail et vitraux de l’église Notre-Dame d’Alençon : nomenclature des peintres, peintres-vitriers, aux quinzième et seizième siècles à Alençon. Paris, E. Plon, Nourrit (1891).
