= Cerisé =

- Commune
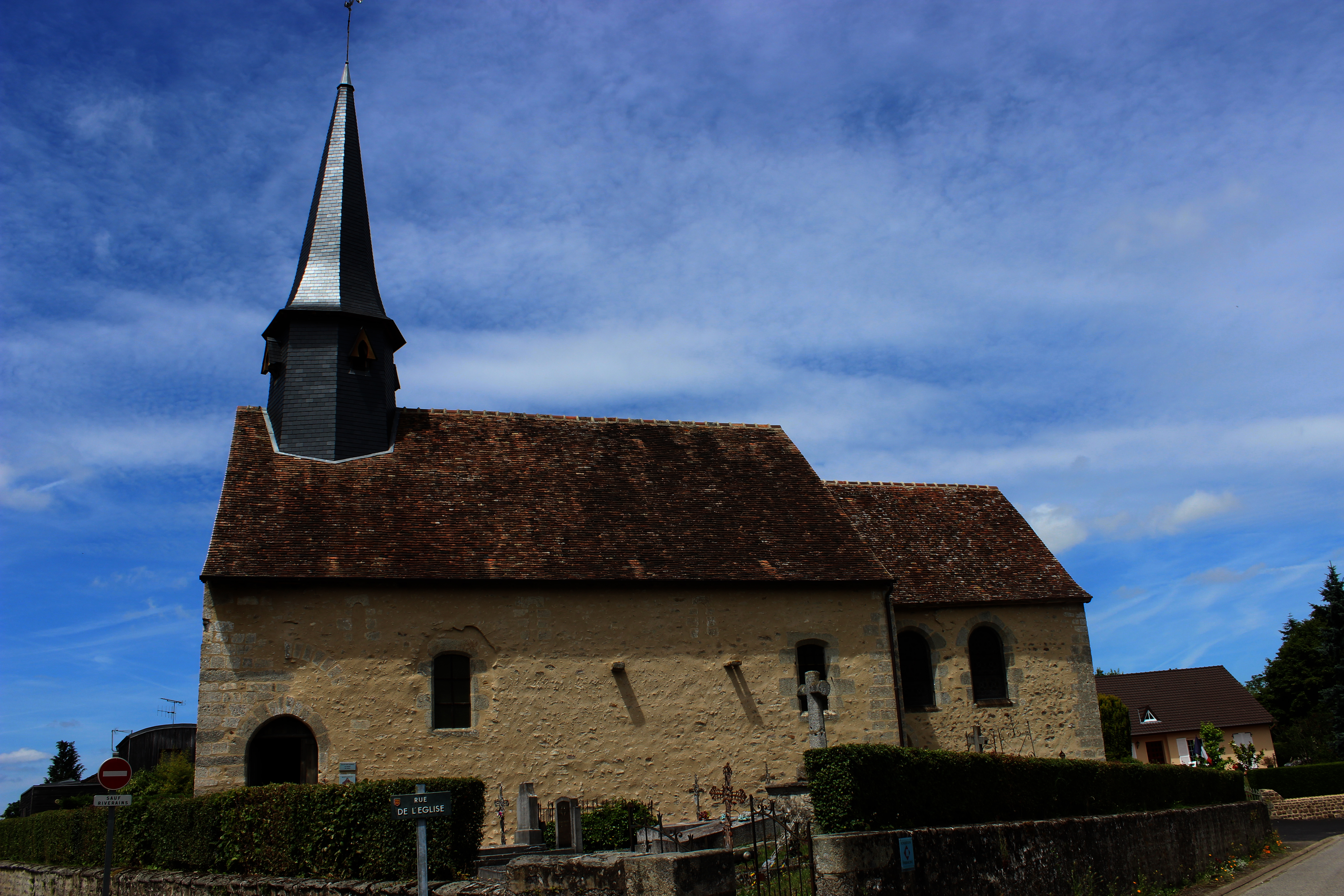
- The church in Cerisé
- Location of Cerisé
- Location within France Location within Normandy
- Coordinates: 48°26′30″N 0°07′43″E
- Country: France
- Region: Normandy
- Department: Orne
- Arrondissement: Alençon
- Canton: Alençon-1
- Intercommunality: CU d'Alençon

Government
  - Mayor (2020–2026): Patrick Cousin
- Area^{1}: 4.42 km^{2} (1.71 sq mi)
- Elevation: 142 m (466 ft)
- Highest elevation: 147 m (482 ft)
- Lowest elevation: 130 m (430 ft)
- Population (2023): 844
  - Density: 191/km^{2} (495/sq mi)
- Time zone: UTC+01:00 (CET)
  - Summer (DST): UTC+02:00 (CEST)
- INSEE/Postal code: 61077 /61000
- ^{1} French Land Register data, which excludes lakes, ponds, glaciers > 1 km^{2} (0.386 sq mi or 247 acres) and river estuaries.

Cerisé (French pronunciation: [səʁize]) is a commune in the Orne department in north-western France.

== Geography ==
The commune along with another 32 communes is part of a 3,503 hectare, Natura 2000 conservation area, called the Haute vallée de la Sarthe.

The river Sarthe is the sole watercourse that flows through the commune.

== Points of Interest ==
- Aérodrome d'Alençon - Valframbert is an Aerodrome within the commune which is also shared with neighbouring communes of Valframbert and Alençon that opened in 1936. Its IATA airport code is XAN and its ICAO airport code is LFOF.

=== National heritage sites ===
- Saint-Germain Church is a 12th-century church, which was made a Monument historique in 2001.

== See also ==
- Communes of the Orne department
