= Ciral =

- Commune
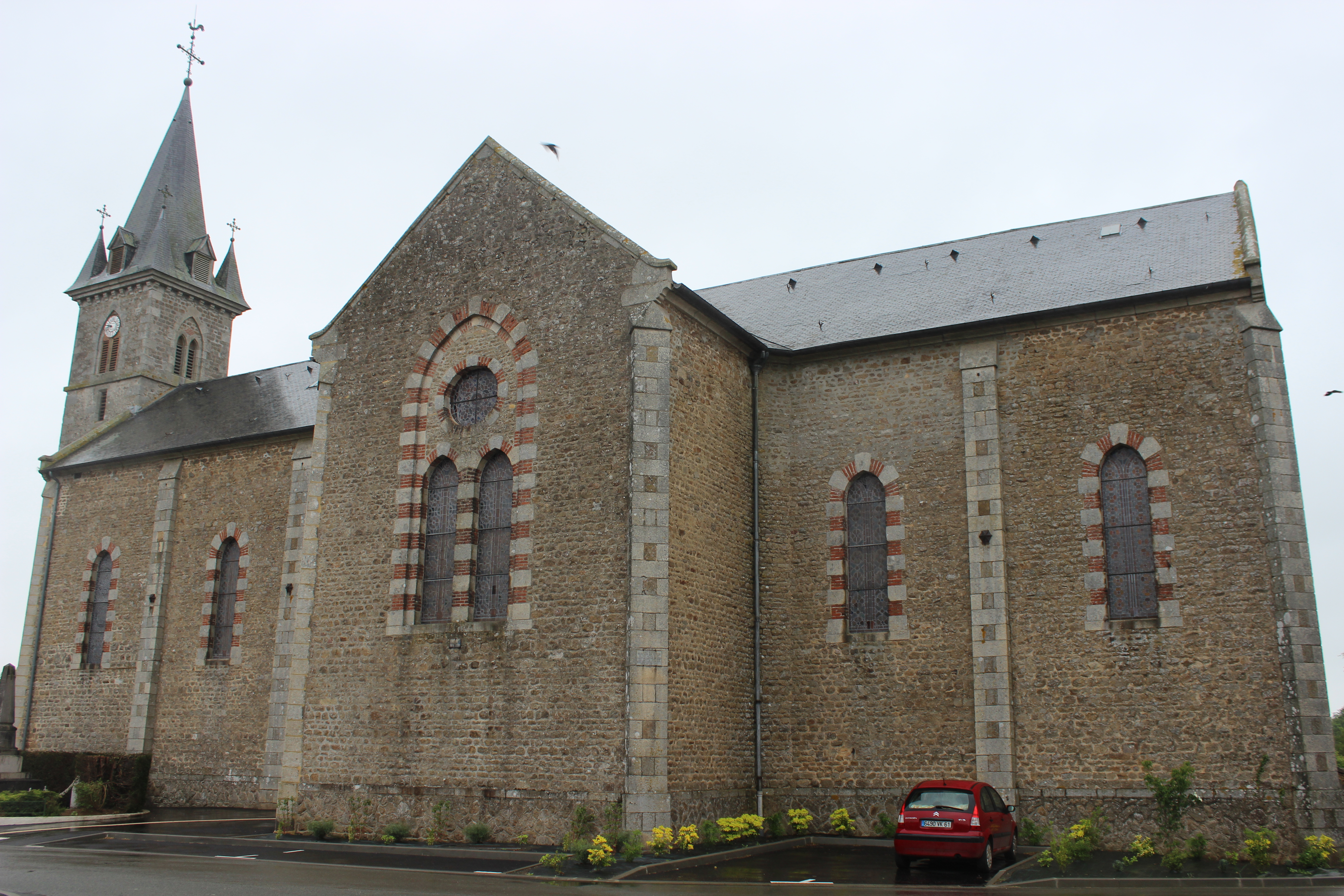
- The church in Ciral
- Location of Ciral
- Location within France Location within Normandy
- Coordinates: 48°29′41″N 0°08′11″W
- Country: France
- Region: Normandy
- Department: Orne
- Arrondissement: Alençon
- Canton: Magny-le-Désert
- Intercommunality: CU Alençon

Government
  - Mayor (2020–2026): Martine Voltier
- Area^{1}: 17.99 km^{2} (6.95 sq mi)
- Elevation: 315 m (1,033 ft)
- Highest elevation: 358 m (1,175 ft)
- Lowest elevation: 267 m (876 ft)
- Population (2023): 409
  - Density: 22.7/km^{2} (58.9/sq mi)
- Time zone: UTC+01:00 (CET)
  - Summer (DST): UTC+02:00 (CEST)
- INSEE/Postal code: 61107 /61320
- ^{1} French Land Register data, which excludes lakes, ponds, glaciers > 1 km^{2} (0.386 sq mi or 247 acres) and river estuaries.

Ciral (French pronunciation: [siʁal]) is a commune in the Orne department in north-western France.

== Geography ==
The commune is made up of the following collection of villages and hamlets, La Bouillière, Les Chaussées, Grand Germancé, Ciral, La Maçonnerie and L'Auberderie.

== See also ==
- Communes of the Orne department
- Parc naturel régional Normandie-Maine
