= Damigny =

- Commune
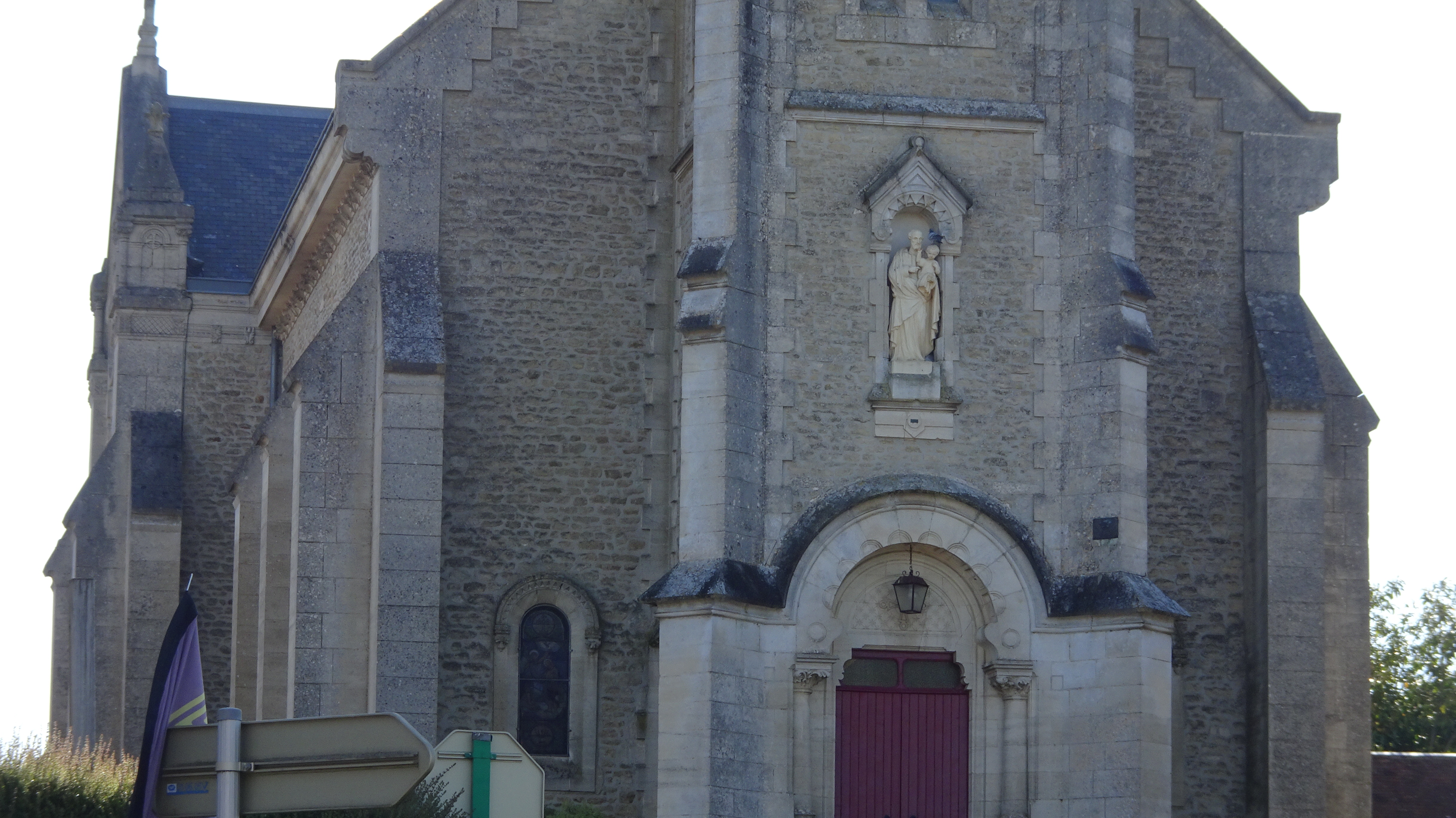
- Location of Damigny
- Location within France Location within Normandy
- Coordinates: 48°26′54″N 0°04′27″E
- Country: France
- Region: Normandy
- Department: Orne
- Arrondissement: Alençon
- Canton: Damigny
- Intercommunality: CU d'Alençon

Government
  - Mayor (2020–2026): Anita Paillot
- Area^{1}: 4.81 km^{2} (1.86 sq mi)
- Elevation: 150 m (490 ft)
- Highest elevation: 179 m (587 ft)
- Lowest elevation: 140 m (460 ft)
- Population (2023): 2,446
  - Density: 509/km^{2} (1,320/sq mi)
- Demonym: Damigniens
- Time zone: UTC+01:00 (CET)
  - Summer (DST): UTC+02:00 (CEST)
- INSEE/Postal code: 61143 /61250
- Website: www.damigny.fr
- ^{1} French Land Register data, which excludes lakes, ponds, glaciers > 1 km^{2} (0.386 sq mi or 247 acres) and river estuaries.

Damigny (French pronunciation: [damiɲi], before 1988: Damigni) is a commune in the Orne department in north-western France.

== Geography ==
The commune is made up of the following collection of villages and hamlets, Bourdon, Les Fourneaux, Damigny, Le Pont du Fresne and Le Printemps.

La Briante is the sole watercourse that flows through the commune.

== Population ==
Historical population
Year	Pop.	±% p.a.
1968	1,334	—
1975	2,305	+8.13%
1982	2,458	+0.92%
1990	2,495	+0.19%
1999	2,917	+1.75%
2007	2,867	−0.22%
2012	2,763	−0.74%
2017	2,568	−1.45%
2023	2,446	−0.81%
Source: INSEE

== See also ==
- Communes of the Orne department
