= Colombiers, Orne =

Colombiers
- Commune
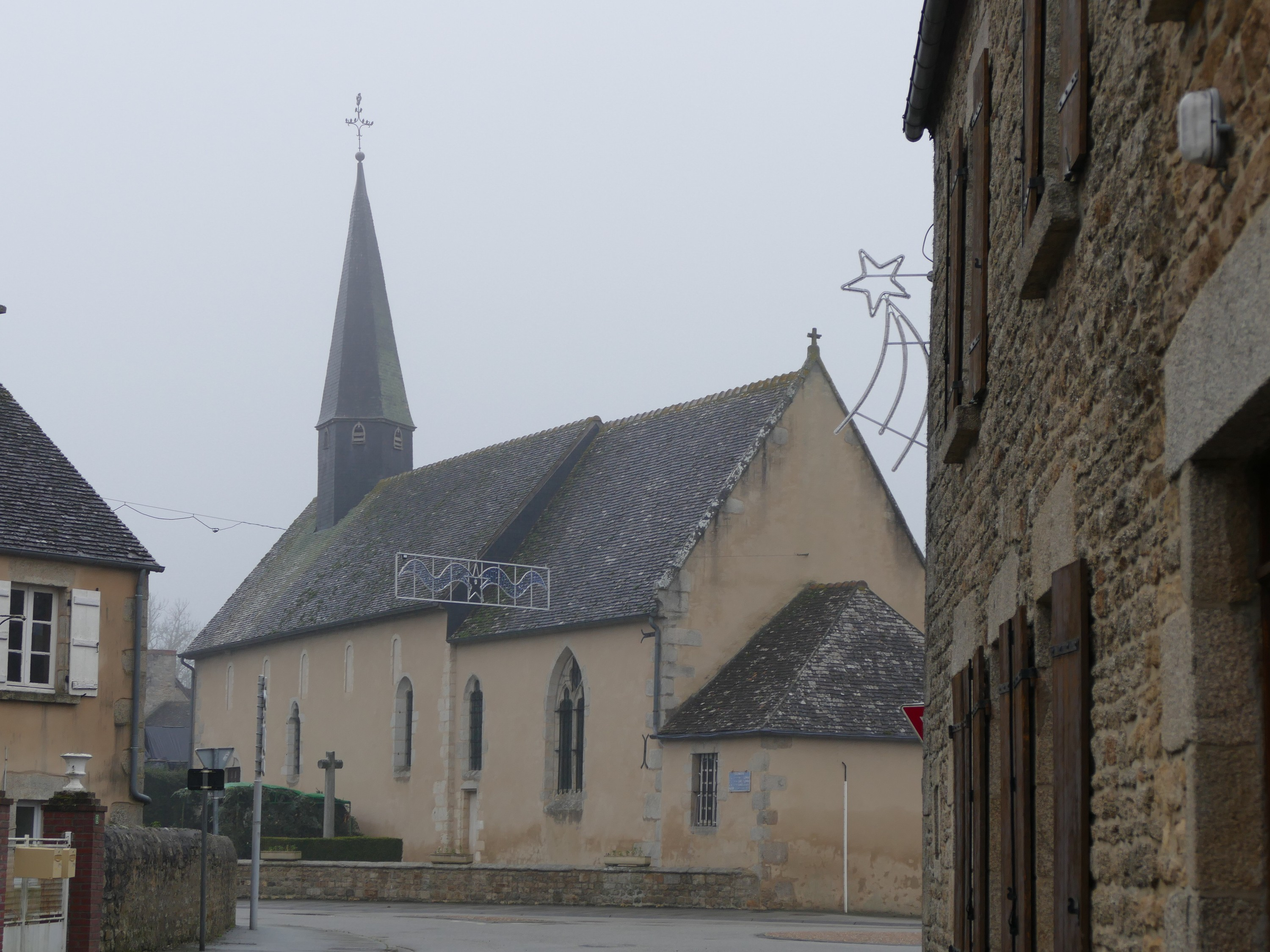
- The church in Colombiers
- Location of Colombiers
- Location within France Location within Normandy
- Coordinates: 48°28′13″N 0°03′19″E
- Country: France
- Region: Normandy
- Department: Orne
- Arrondissement: Alençon
- Canton: Damigny
- Intercommunality: CU d'Alençon

Government
  - Mayor (2022–2026): Monique Olin
- Area^{1}: 12.34 km^{2} (4.76 sq mi)
- Elevation: 200 m (660 ft)
- Highest elevation: 216 m (709 ft)
- Lowest elevation: 149 m (489 ft)
- Population (2023): 336
  - Density: 27.2/km^{2} (70.5/sq mi)
- Time zone: UTC+01:00 (CET)
  - Summer (DST): UTC+02:00 (CEST)
- INSEE/Postal code: 61111 /61250
- ^{1} French Land Register data, which excludes lakes, ponds, glaciers > 1 km^{2} (0.386 sq mi or 247 acres) and river estuaries.

Colombiers (French pronunciation: [kɔlɔ̃bje]) is a commune in the Orne department in north-western France.

== Geography ==
The commune is made up of the following collection of villages and hamlets, Briante, Les Coutardières, Les Landes, Haras du Buff and Colombiers.

La Briante is the sole watercourse that flows through the commune.

The commune is in the Normandie-Maine Regional Natural Park.

== Points of interest ==
- Chemin-de-Maure is a Roman road that was believed to run from Alençon to Colombiers, about 50 metres of the road is visible.

=== National heritage sites ===
- Domaine de Lonrai, the estate was created in the seventeenth century, it was registered as a Monument historique in 1999. The stud farm was built in 1863 by Armand Donon. The grounds also cover the neighbouring commune of Lonrai

== See also ==
- Communes of the Orne department
- Parc naturel régional Normandie-Maine
