= Fontenai-les-Louvets =

- Part of L'Orée-d'Écouves
- Location of Fontenai-les-Louvets
- Location within France Location within Normandy
- Coordinates: 48°31′41″N 0°00′02″W
- Country: France
- Region: Normandy
- Department: Orne
- Arrondissement: Alençon
- Canton: Magny-le-Désert
- Commune: L'Orée-d'Écouves
- Area^{1}: 18.77 km^{2} (7.25 sq mi)
- Elevation: 304 m (997 ft)
- Highest elevation: 413 m (1,355 ft)
- Lowest elevation: 257 m (843 ft)
- Population (2022): 277
  - Density: 14.8/km^{2} (38.2/sq mi)
- Time zone: UTC+01:00 (CET)
  - Summer (DST): UTC+02:00 (CEST)
- Postal code: 61420
- ^{1} French Land Register data, which excludes lakes, ponds, glaciers > 1 km^{2} (0.386 sq mi or 247 acres) and river estuaries.

Fontenai-les-Louvets (French pronunciation: [fɔ̃tnɛ le luvɛ]) is a former commune in the Orne department in north-western France. On 1 January 2019, it was merged into the new commune L'Orée-d'Écouves. It is located in the Forêt d'Écouves in Normandy.

== Points of Interest ==
The commune has the highest point in Normandy, called the Signal d'Écouves which is 413 metres in height.

=== National Heritage sites ===
- Markers of Forêt d'Écouves a set of 80 markers positioned in the 18th century that mark the boundaries of the forest, they were registered as a Monument historique in 1987.

== See also ==
- Communes of the Orne department
- Parc naturel régional Normandie-Maine
