= L'Orée-d'Écouves =

- Commune
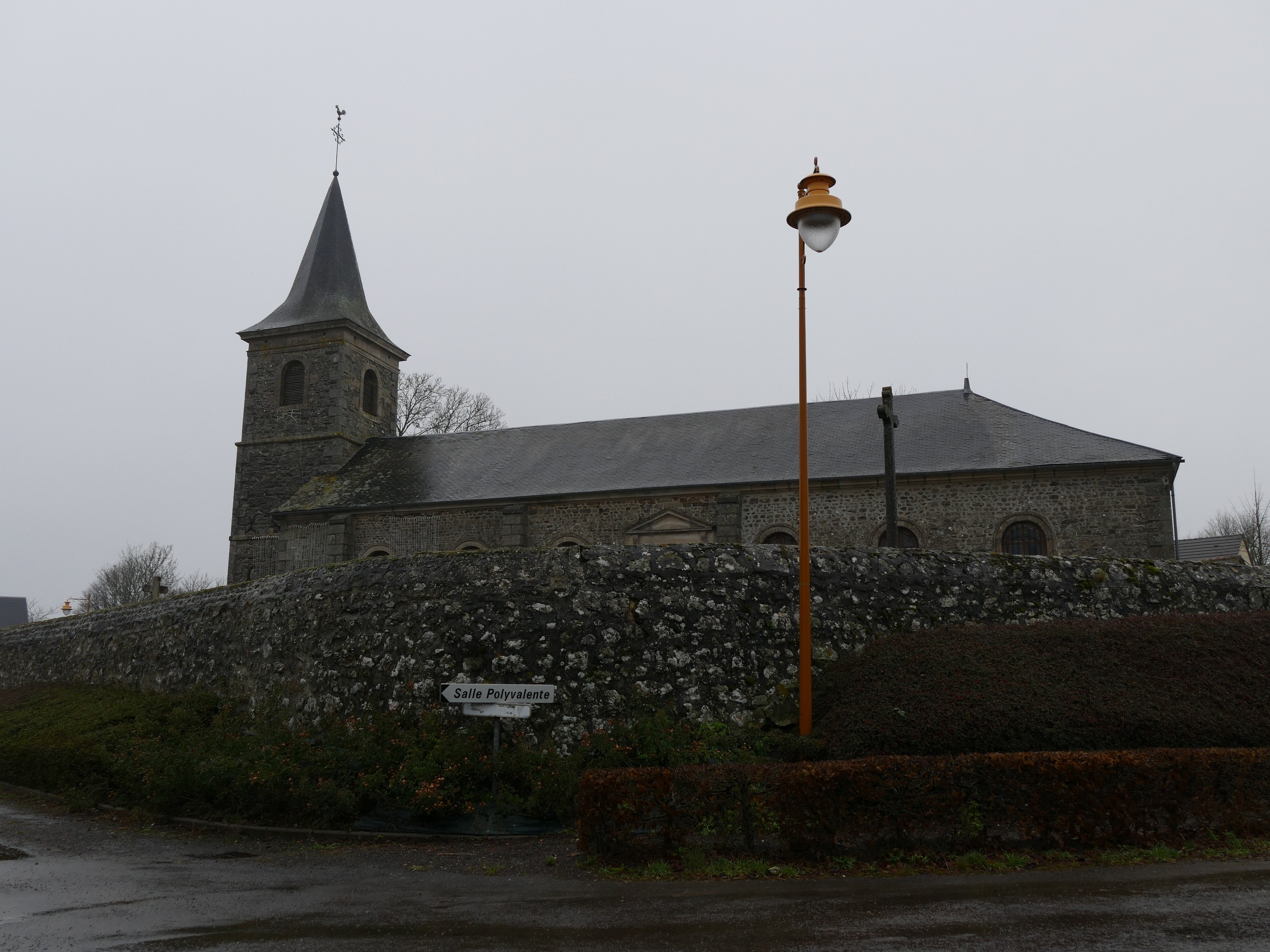
- The church in Livaie
- Location of L'Orée-d'Écouves
- Location within France Location within Normandy
- Coordinates: 48°30′55″N 0°01′55″W
- Country: France
- Region: Normandy
- Department: Orne
- Arrondissement: Alençon
- Canton: Magny-le-Désert
- Intercommunality: CU Alençon

Government
  - Mayor (2020–2026): Sylvie Poirier-Christian
- Area^{1}: 44.45 km^{2} (17.16 sq mi)
- Highest elevation: 413 m (1,355 ft)
- Lowest elevation: 197 m (646 ft)
- Population (2023): 709
  - Density: 16.0/km^{2} (41.3/sq mi)
- Time zone: UTC+01:00 (CET)
  - Summer (DST): UTC+02:00 (CEST)
- INSEE/Postal code: 61228 /61420
- ^{1} French Land Register data, which excludes lakes, ponds, glaciers > 1 km^{2} (0.386 sq mi or 247 acres) and river estuaries.

L'Orée-d'Écouves (French pronunciation: [lɔʁe dekuv]) is a commune in the Orne department in north-western France. It was established on 1 January 2019 by merger of the former communes of Livaie (the seat), Fontenai-les-Louvets, Longuenoë and Saint-Didier-sous-Écouves.

== Geography ==
The commune is made up of the following collection of villages and hamlets, Landrée, La Noé Plate, Saint-Didier-sous-Écouves, Fontenai, La Biochère, Gatenoë, L'Orée-d'Écouves, La Baudrière, Longuenoë and Livaie.

The commune is located within the Normandie-Maine Regional Natural Park.

The commune along with 26 others contains part of the Forêt d'Écouves.

The Sarthon river flows through the commune. In addition a stream, ruisseau de brûlon flows through the commune.

The Commune along with another 11 communes shares part of a 5,255 hectare, Natura 2000 conservation area, called the Vallée du Sarthon et affluents.

== Notable buildings and places ==
=== National heritage sites ===
- Markers of Forêt d'Écouves a set of 80 markers positioned in the 18th century that mark the boundaries of the forest, they were registered as a Monument historique in 1987.

== Notable people ==
- Joaquim Pueyo (born 1950) a French politician representing the Socialist Party, was mayor of Livaie from 1983 to 2008.

== See also ==
- Communes of the Orne department
