= Vallée du Sarthon et affluents =

Vallée du Sarthon et affluents translated as Sarthon Valley and tributaries is a Natura 2000 conservation area that is 5,255 hectares in size.

== Geography ==
The area is focused on the Sarthon river a tributary to the Sarthe river. The river flows from the Écouves forest massif creating alluvial plains.

It is spread across 12 different communes all within the departments of Orne and Mayenne;

1. La Ferrière-Bochard
2. Gandelain
3. Lalacelle
4. L'Orée-d'Écouves
5. Ravigny
6. La Roche-Mabile
7. Rouperroux
8. Saint-Céneri-le-Gérei
9. Saint-Denis-sur-Sarthon
10. Saint-Ellier-les-Bois
11. Saint-Nicolas-des-Bois
12. Saint-Pierre-des-Nids

Some of the protected site is within the Normandie-Maine Regional Natural Park.

== Conservation ==
The conservation area has nine species listed in Annex 2 of the Habitats Directive;

1. Northern crested newt
2. Eurasian otter
3. European bullhead
4. Cottus perifretum
5. Brook lamprey
6. White-clawed crayfish
7. Southern damselfly
8. Marsh fritillary
9. Freshwater pearl mussel

In addition the Natura 2000 site has five habitats protected under the Habitats Directive.
