= La Ferrière-Bochard =

- Commune
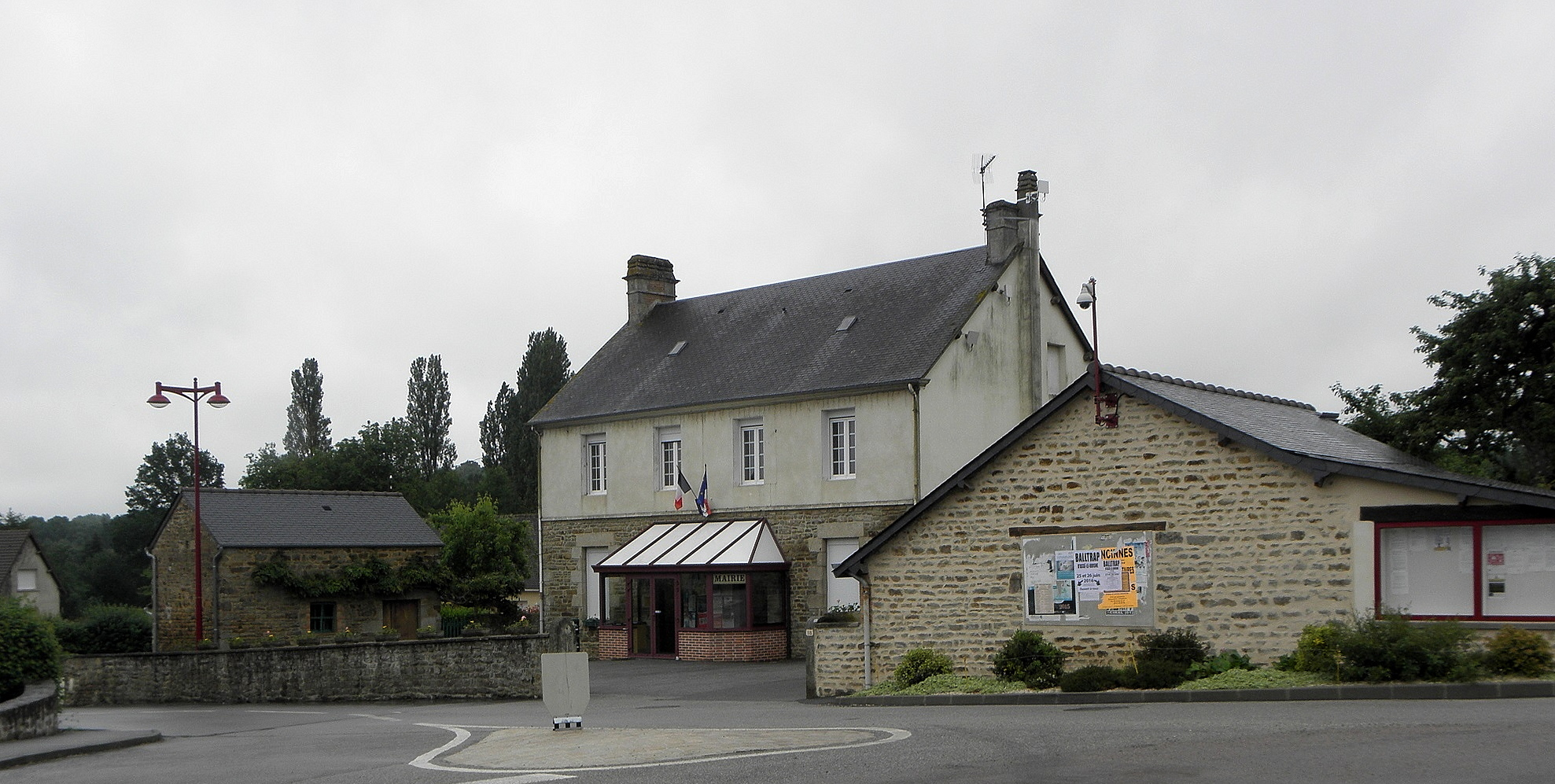
- The town hall in La Ferrière-Bochard
- Location of La Ferrière-Bochard
- Location within France Location within Normandy
- Coordinates: 48°24′53″N 0°01′50″W
- Country: France
- Region: Normandy
- Department: Orne
- Arrondissement: Alençon
- Canton: Damigny
- Intercommunality: CU d'Alençon

Government
  - Mayor (2020–2026): Patrick Joubert
- Area^{1}: 10.82 km^{2} (4.18 sq mi)
- Elevation: 150 m (490 ft)
- Highest elevation: 210 m (690 ft)
- Lowest elevation: 133 m (436 ft)
- Population (2023): 709
  - Density: 65.5/km^{2} (170/sq mi)
- Time zone: UTC+01:00 (CET)
  - Summer (DST): UTC+02:00 (CEST)
- INSEE/Postal code: 61165 /61420
- ^{1} French Land Register data, which excludes lakes, ponds, glaciers > 1 km^{2} (0.386 sq mi or 247 acres) and river estuaries.

La Ferrière-Bochard (French pronunciation: [la fɛʁjɛʁ bɔʃaʁ]) is a commune in the Orne department in north-western France.

== Geography ==
The commune is made up of the following collection of villages and hamlets, Le Fougeret, Le Plessis, La Chauvelière, La Ferrière-Bochard, Saint-Christophe and La Rousselière.

The river Sarthe and one its tributaries, the Sarthon flows through the commune.

The Commune along with another 11 communes shares part of a 5,255 hectare, Natura 2000 conservation area, called the Vallée du Sarthon et affluents.

The commune is in the Normandie-Maine Regional Natural Park.

== Sport ==
- Circuit Motocross Des Sources is a Motocross track in the commune that is also used to host races such as Des championnats de Normandie

== See also ==
- Communes of the Orne department
- Parc naturel régional Normandie-Maine
