= Saint-Denis-sur-Sarthon =

- Commune
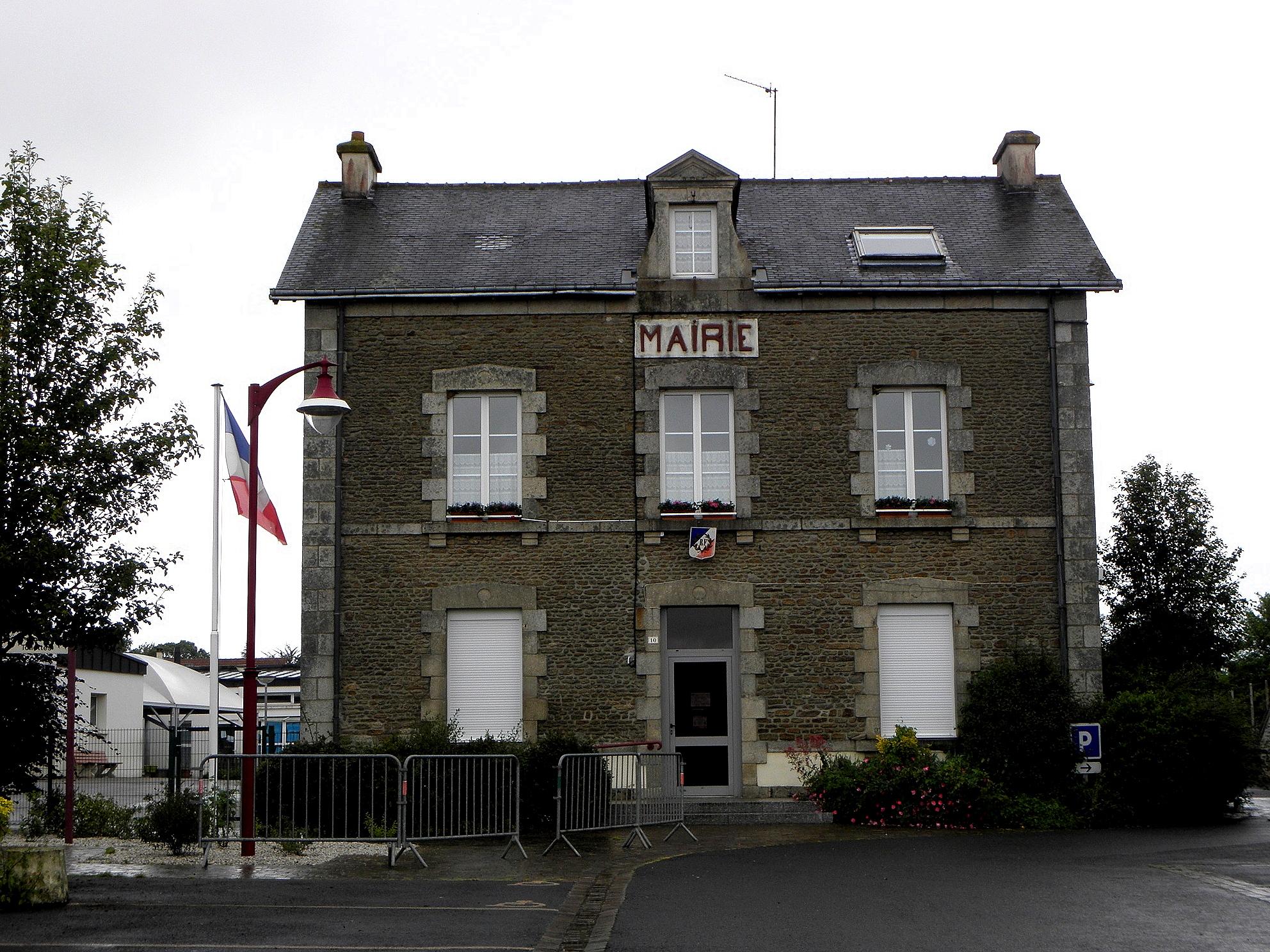
- The town hall in Saint-Denis-sur-Sarthon
- Location of Saint-Denis-sur-Sarthon
- Location within France Location within Normandy
- Coordinates: 48°27′27″N 0°02′59″W
- Country: France
- Region: Normandy
- Department: Orne
- Arrondissement: Alençon
- Canton: Damigny
- Intercommunality: CU Alençon

Government
  - Mayor (2020–2026): Guillaume Julien
- Area^{1}: 13.81 km^{2} (5.33 sq mi)
- Elevation: 203 m (666 ft)
- Highest elevation: 378 m (1,240 ft)
- Lowest elevation: 162 m (531 ft)
- Population (2023): 1,055
  - Density: 76.39/km^{2} (197.9/sq mi)
- Time zone: UTC+01:00 (CET)
  - Summer (DST): UTC+02:00 (CEST)
- INSEE/Postal code: 61382 /61420
- ^{1} French Land Register data, which excludes lakes, ponds, glaciers > 1 km^{2} (0.386 sq mi or 247 acres) and river estuaries.

Saint-Denis-sur-Sarthon (French pronunciation: [sɛ̃ dəni syʁ saʁtɔ̃]) is a commune in the Orne department in north-western France.

Notable Residents Saint Azélie-Marie ("Zélie") Guérin Martin mother of Saint Thérése of Liseux ( Saint Thérèse of the Child Jesus and the Holy Face)

== Geography ==
The commune is made up of the following collection of villages and hamlets, Le Fault, Rance, La Piogerie, Naizement, La Frette, La Hardonnière, Les Coubardières and Les Sauvagères.

The commune is within the Normandie-Maine Regional Natural Park and Forêt d'Écouves.

The Commune along with another 11 communes shares part of a 5,255 hectare, Natura 2000 conservation area, called the Vallée du Sarthon et affluents.

The Sarthon river and le Chandon are the two watercourses which flow through the commune.

== Points of interest ==
=== National heritage sites ===
- Large forge built in 1856 this blast furnace supplied Iron for the Alencon Railway, it was registered as a Monument historique in 1990.

== See also ==
- Communes of the Orne department
- Parc naturel régional Normandie-Maine
