= Saint-Nicolas-des-Bois, Orne =

Saint-Nicolas-des-Bois
- Commune
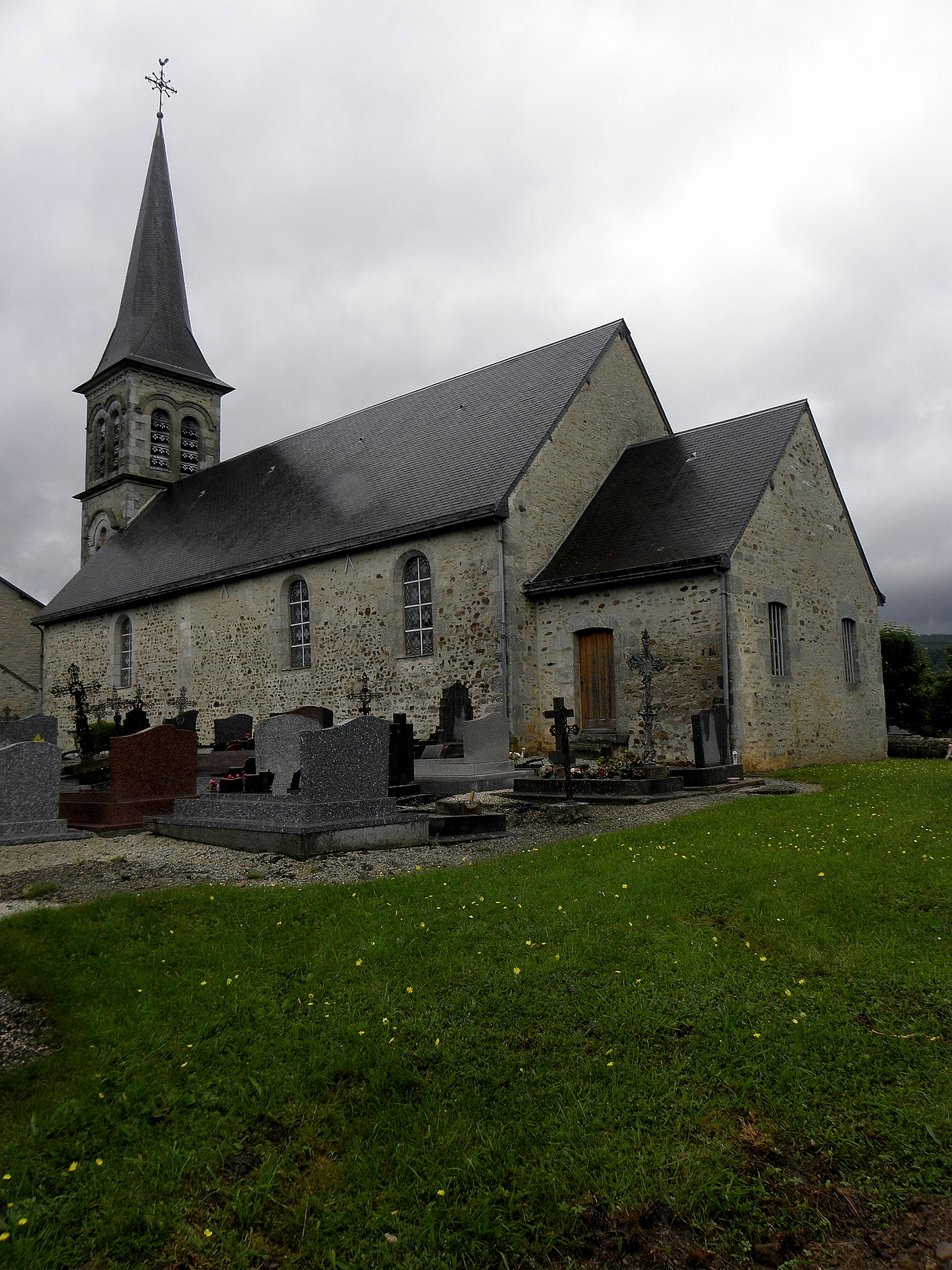
- The church in Saint-Nicolas-des-Bois
- Location of Saint-Nicolas-des-Bois
- Location within France Location within Normandy
- Coordinates: 48°29′41″N 0°01′03″E
- Country: France
- Region: Normandy
- Department: Orne
- Arrondissement: Alençon
- Canton: Damigny
- Intercommunality: CU Alençon

Government
  - Mayor (2020–2026): Gérard Lemoine
- Area^{1}: 25.26 km^{2} (9.75 sq mi)
- Elevation: 233 m (764 ft)
- Highest elevation: 411 m (1,348 ft)
- Lowest elevation: 175 m (574 ft)
- Population (2023): 285
  - Density: 11.3/km^{2} (29.2/sq mi)
- Time zone: UTC+01:00 (CET)
  - Summer (DST): UTC+02:00 (CEST)
- INSEE/Postal code: 61433 /61250
- ^{1} French Land Register data, which excludes lakes, ponds, glaciers > 1 km^{2} (0.386 sq mi or 247 acres) and river estuaries.

Saint-Nicolas-des-Bois (French pronunciation: [sɛ̃ nikɔla de bwa]) is a commune in the Orne department in north-western France.

== Geography ==
The commune is made up of the following collection of villages and hamlets, Saint-Nicolas-des-Bois, Le Froust, Les Vignes, Clerchenay and Pinchèvre.

The commune is within the Normandie-Maine Regional Natural Park and Forêt d'Écouves.

The Commune along with another 11 communes shares part of a 5,255 hectare, Natura 2000 conservation area, called the Vallée du Sarthon et affluents.

La Briante is the sole watercourse that flows through the commune.

== Points of Interest ==
=== National heritage sites ===
- Markers of Forêt d'Écouves a set of 80 markers positioned in the 18th century that mark the boundaries of the forest, they were registered as a Monument historique in 1987.

== See also ==
- Communes of the Orne department
- Parc naturel régional Normandie-Maine
