= Canton of Damigny =

Coordinates: 48.45°N 0.07°E

The canton of Damigny is an administrative division of the Orne department, northwestern France. It was created at the French canton reorganisation which came into effect in March 2015. Its seat is in Damigny.

It consists of the following communes:

1. Colombiers
2. Condé-sur-Sarthe
3. Cuissai
4. Damigny
5. La Ferrière-Bochard
6. Gandelain
7. Héloup
8. Lalacelle
9. Lonrai
10. Mieuxcé
11. Pacé
12. La Roche-Mabile
13. Saint-Céneri-le-Gérei
14. Saint-Denis-sur-Sarthon
15. Saint-Nicolas-des-Bois
16. Valframbert
