= Héloup =

- Commune
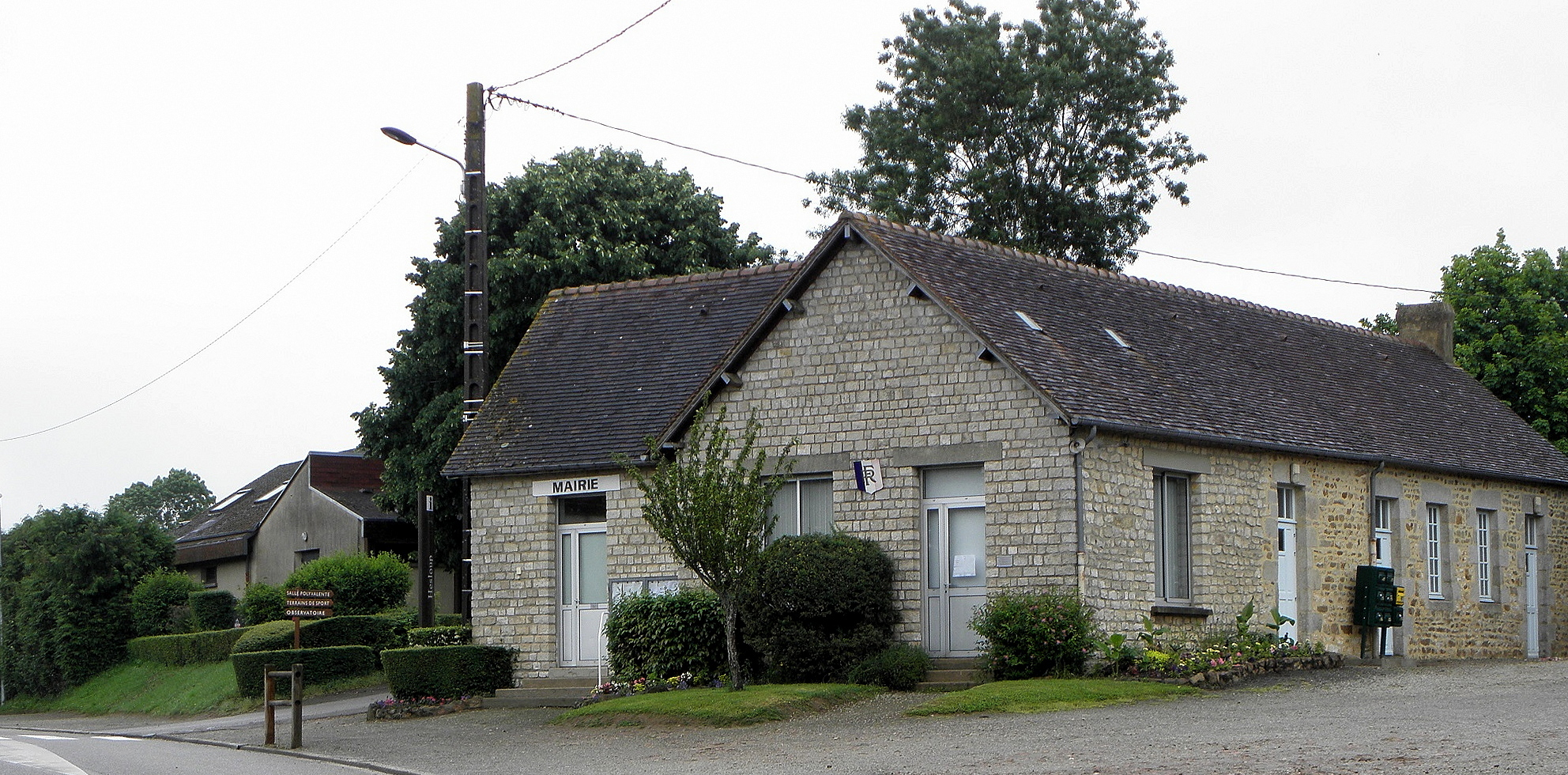
- The town hall in Héloup
- Location of Héloup
- Location within France Location within Normandy
- Coordinates: 48°23′53″N 0°01′36″E
- Country: France
- Region: Normandy
- Department: Orne
- Arrondissement: Alençon
- Canton: Damigny
- Intercommunality: CU d'Alençon

Government
  - Mayor (2022–2026): Sylvie Gaillard
- Area^{1}: 12.96 km^{2} (5.00 sq mi)
- Elevation: 197 m (646 ft)
- Highest elevation: 202 m (663 ft)
- Lowest elevation: 123 m (404 ft)
- Population (2023): 899
  - Density: 69.4/km^{2} (180/sq mi)
- Time zone: UTC+01:00 (CET)
  - Summer (DST): UTC+02:00 (CEST)
- INSEE/Postal code: 61203 /61250
- ^{1} French Land Register data, which excludes lakes, ponds, glaciers > 1 km^{2} (0.386 sq mi or 247 acres) and river estuaries.

Héloup (French pronunciation: [elu]), also spelled Hesloup, is a commune in the Orne department in north-western France.

== Geography ==
The commune is made up of the following collection of villages and hamlets, Les Maisons Neuves, Héloup, Les Adriers and Sainte-James.

The river Sarthe flows through the commune.

The commune along with another 32 communes is part of a 3,503 hectare, Natura 2000 conservation area, called the Haute vallée de la Sarthe.

The commune is in the Normandie-Maine Regional Natural Park.

== Points of interest ==
- Héloup Astronomical Observatory is the largest observatory in the Orne department, measuring 5 meters in diameter. The building of the observatory was built at an altitude of 201 metres in 1990.

== See also ==
- Communes of the Orne department
- Parc naturel régional Normandie-Maine
