= Mieuxcé =

- Commune
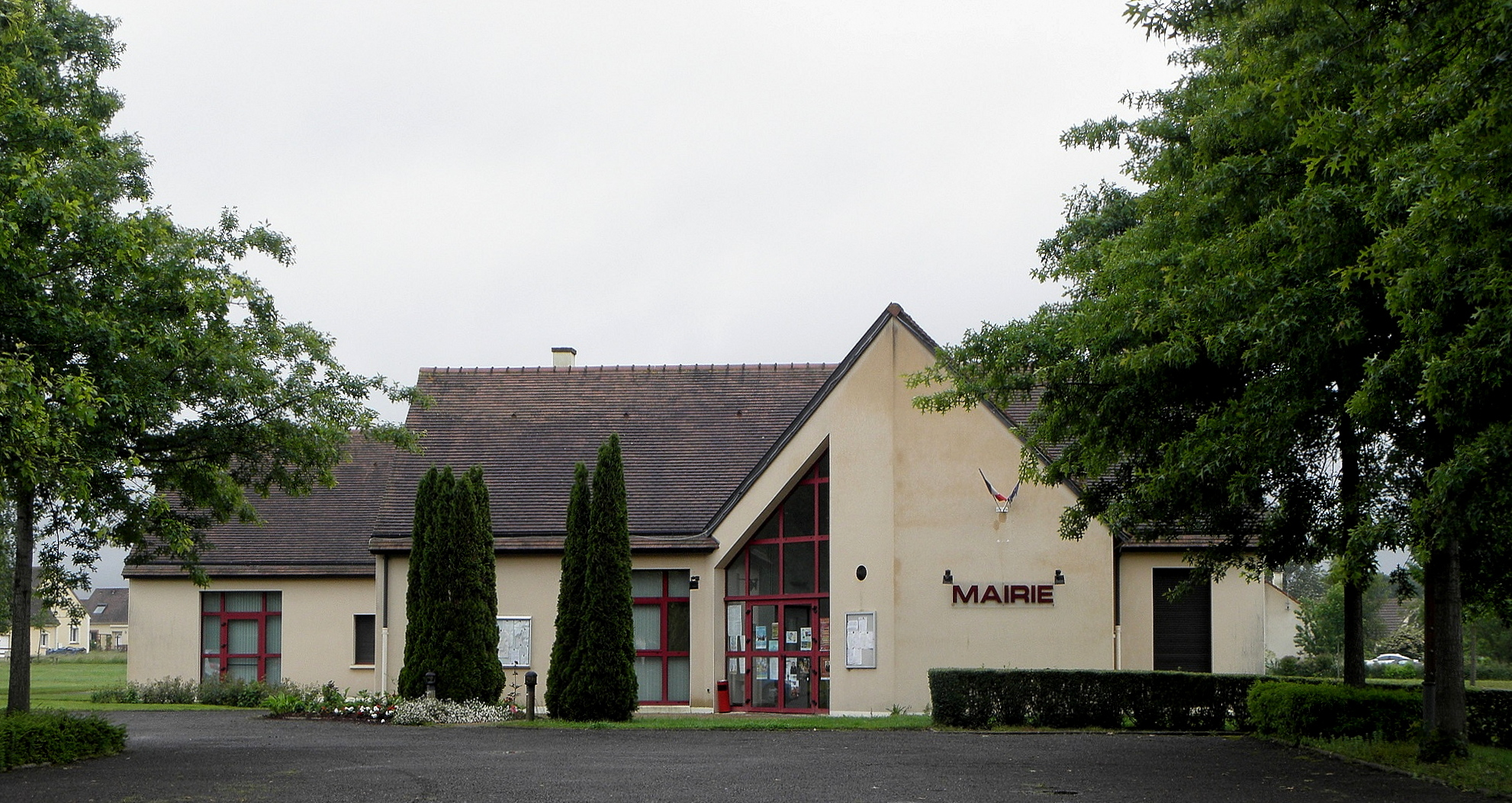
- The town hall in Mieuxcé
- Location of Mieuxcé
- Location within France Location within Normandy
- Coordinates: 48°24′04″N 0°00′43″E
- Country: France
- Region: Normandy
- Department: Orne
- Arrondissement: Alençon
- Canton: Damigny
- Intercommunality: CU d'Alençon

Government
  - Mayor (2020–2026): Nathalie Ripaux
- Area^{1}: 10.36 km^{2} (4.00 sq mi)
- Elevation: 128 m (420 ft)
- Highest elevation: 178 m (584 ft)
- Lowest elevation: 122 m (400 ft)
- Population (2023): 617
  - Density: 59.6/km^{2} (154/sq mi)
- Time zone: UTC+01:00 (CET)
  - Summer (DST): UTC+02:00 (CEST)
- INSEE/Postal code: 61279 /61250
- ^{1} French Land Register data, which excludes lakes, ponds, glaciers > 1 km^{2} (0.386 sq mi or 247 acres) and river estuaries.

Mieuxcé (French pronunciation: [mjøse]) is a commune in the Orne department in north-western France.

== Geography ==
The commune is made up of the following collection of villages and hamlets, La Fresnaye, Les Aunais, Bouaille, Le Poteau, Roglain, Le Pont, La Vaudorerie, Le Bois du But, Mieuxcé and Haras du But.

The river Sarthe flows through the commune.

The commune along with another 32 communes is part of a 3,503 hectare, Natura 2000 conservation area, called the Haute vallée de la Sarthe.

The commune is in the Normandie-Maine Regional Natural Park.

== See also ==
- Communes of the Orne department
- Parc naturel régional Normandie-Maine
