= Champfleur =

- Commune
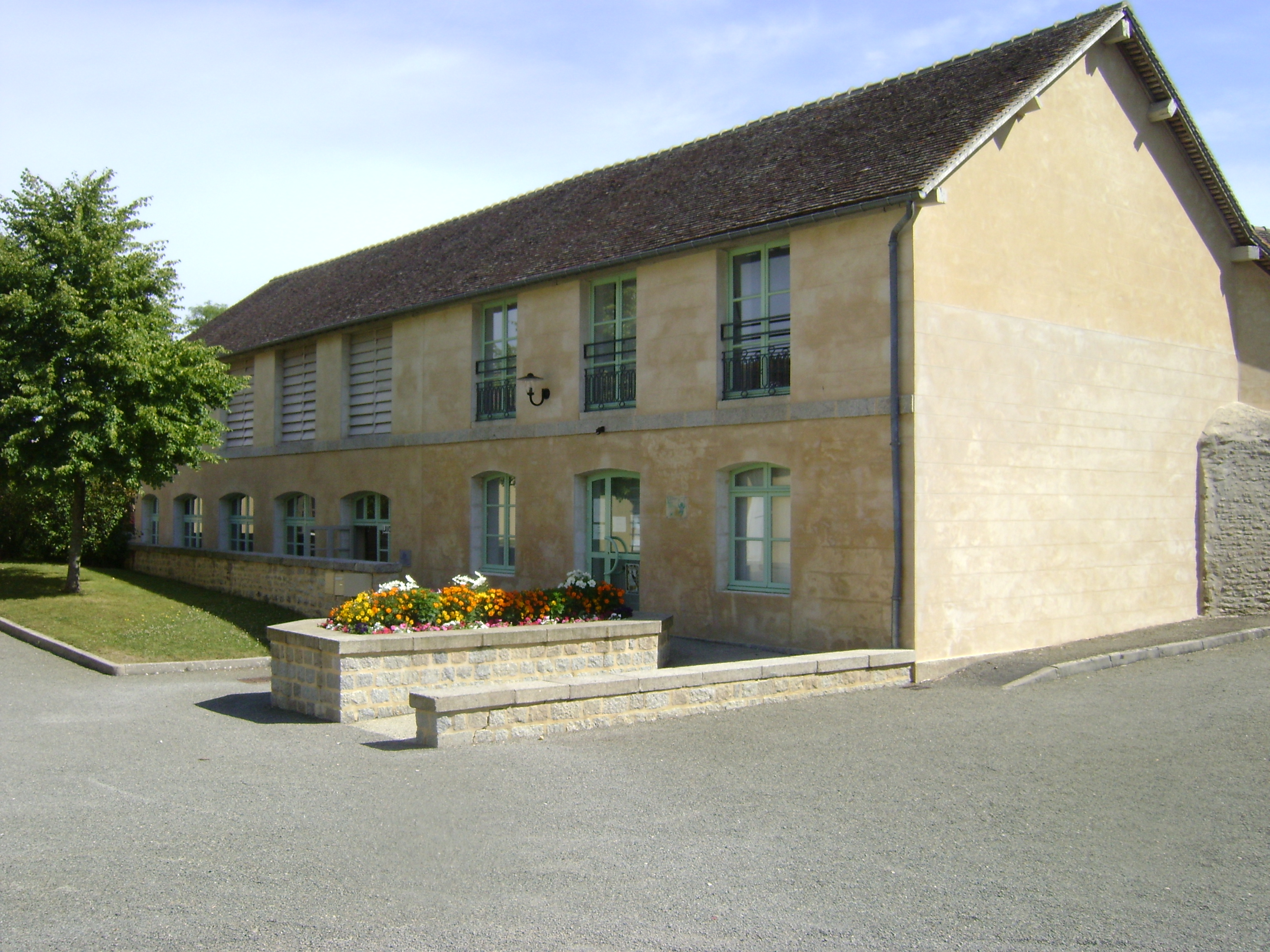
- The bath house of the convent of the Franciscan Sisters
- Location of Champfleur
- Location within France Location within Pays de la Loire
- Coordinates: 48°23′10″N 0°07′40″E
- Country: France
- Region: Pays de la Loire
- Department: Sarthe
- Arrondissement: Mamers
- Canton: Mamers
- Intercommunality: CU d'Alençon

Government
  - Mayor (2020–2026): Brigitte Zeniter
- Area^{1}: 13.14 km^{2} (5.07 sq mi)
- Elevation: 146 m (479 ft)
- Highest elevation: 197 m (646 ft)
- Lowest elevation: 114 m (374 ft)
- Population (2023): 1,282
  - Density: 97.56/km^{2} (252.7/sq mi)
- Demonym: Champflorains
- Time zone: UTC+01:00 (CET)
  - Summer (DST): UTC+02:00 (CEST)
- INSEE/Postal code: 72056 /72610
- ^{1} French Land Register data, which excludes lakes, ponds, glaciers > 1 km^{2} (0.386 sq mi or 247 acres) and river estuaries.

Champfleur (French pronunciation: [ʃɑ̃flœʁ]) is a commune in the Sarthe department in the region of Pays de la Loire in north-western France.

== Geography ==
The commune is made up of the following collection of villages and hamlets, Barrée, Le Pont, La Morinière, Champfleur, La Tournerie, Les Vignes and Groutel.

== See also ==
- Communes of the Sarthe department
