= Cuissai =

- Commune
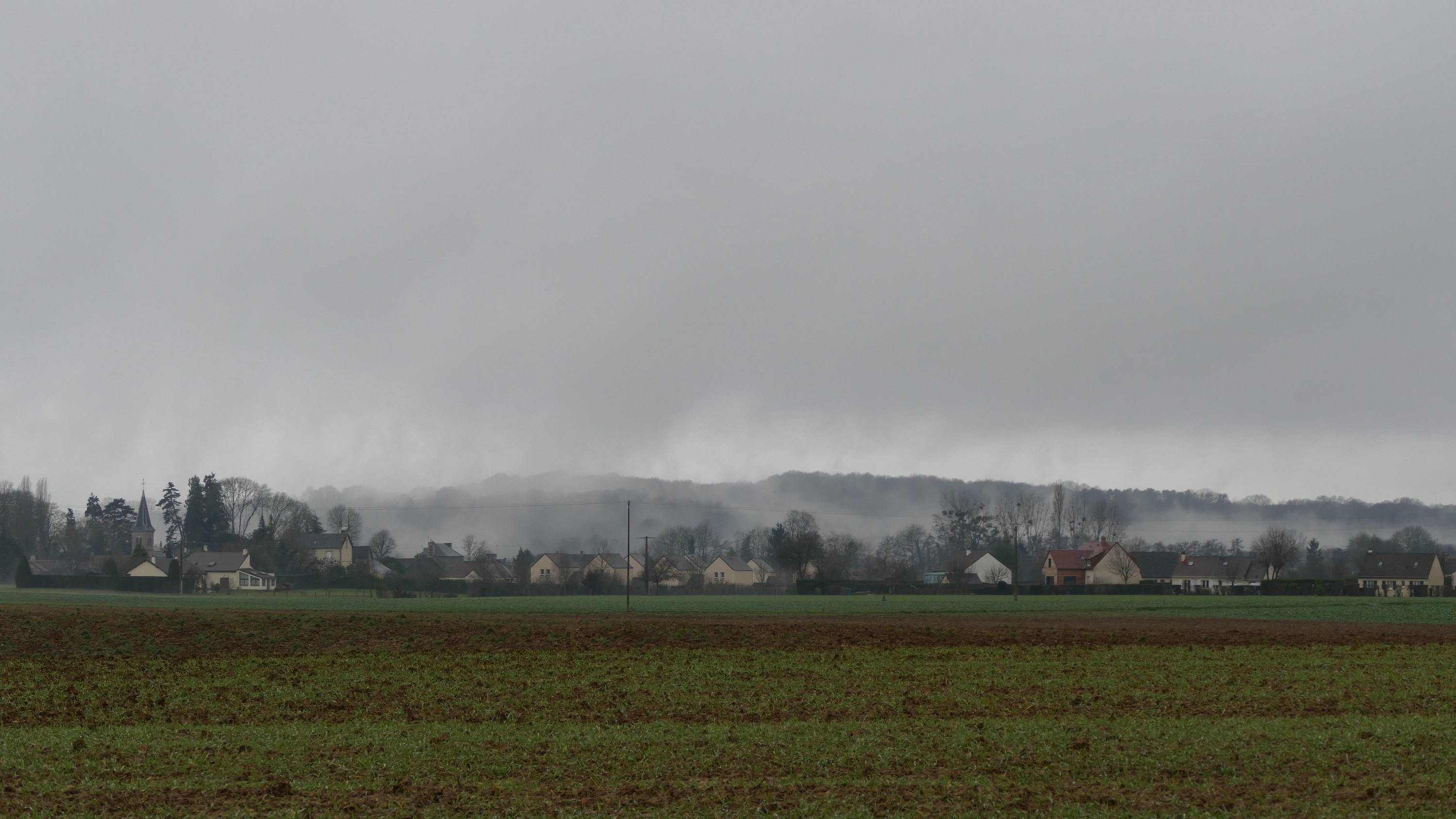
- A general view of Cuissai
- Location of Cuissai
- Location within France Location within Normandy
- Coordinates: 48°28′17″N 0°01′02″E
- Country: France
- Region: Normandy
- Department: Orne
- Arrondissement: Alençon
- Canton: Damigny
- Intercommunality: CU d'Alençon

Government
  - Mayor (2020–2026): Jean-Marie Leclercq
- Area^{1}: 8.78 km^{2} (3.39 sq mi)
- Elevation: 157 m (515 ft)
- Highest elevation: 370 m (1,210 ft)
- Lowest elevation: 147 m (482 ft)
- Population (2023): 436
  - Density: 49.7/km^{2} (129/sq mi)
- Time zone: UTC+01:00 (CET)
  - Summer (DST): UTC+02:00 (CEST)
- INSEE/Postal code: 61141 /61250
- ^{1} French Land Register data, which excludes lakes, ponds, glaciers > 1 km^{2} (0.386 sq mi or 247 acres) and river estuaries.

Cuissai (French pronunciation: [kɥisɛ]) is a commune in the Orne department in north-western France.

== Geography ==
The commune is made up of the following collection of villages and hamlets, Chêne Boulay and Cuissai.

The commune is within the Normandie-Maine Regional Natural Park and Forêt d'Écouves.

== See also ==
- Communes of the Orne department
