= Chenay, Sarthe =

Chenay
- Commune
- Location of Chenay
- Location within France Location within Pays de la Loire
- Coordinates: 48°26′58″N 0°09′45″E
- Country: France
- Region: Pays de la Loire
- Department: Sarthe
- Arrondissement: Mamers
- Canton: Mamers
- Intercommunality: CU Alençon

Government
  - Mayor (2020–2026): Joseph Lambert
- Area^{1}: 2.16 km^{2} (0.83 sq mi)
- Highest elevation: 156 m (512 ft)
- Lowest elevation: 132 m (433 ft)
- Population (2023): 255
  - Density: 118/km^{2} (306/sq mi)
- Demonym(s): Cheneysien, Cheneysienne
- Time zone: UTC+01:00 (CET)
  - Summer (DST): UTC+02:00 (CEST)
- INSEE/Postal code: 72076 /72610
- ^{1} French Land Register data, which excludes lakes, ponds, glaciers > 1 km^{2} (0.386 sq mi or 247 acres) and river estuaries.

Chenay (French pronunciation: [ʃənɛ]) is a commune in the Sarthe department in the Pays de la Loire region in north-western France.

== Geography ==
The commune is in the Normandie-Maine Regional Natural Park.

The commune along with another 32 communes is part of a 3,503 hectare, Natura 2000 conservation area, called the Haute vallée de la Sarthe.

The river Sarthe flows through the commune.

== See also ==
- Communes of the Sarthe department
