= Semallé =

- Commune
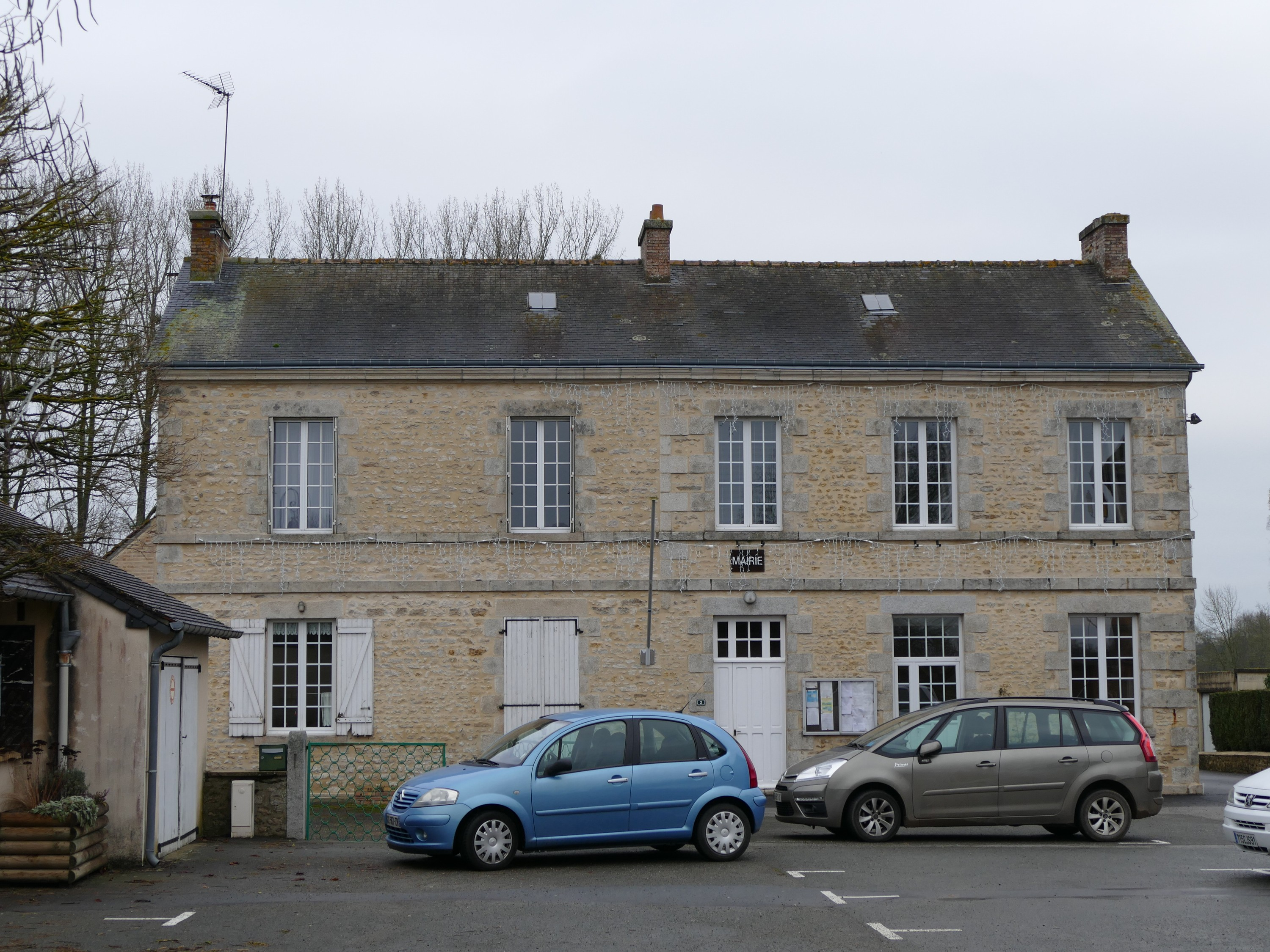
- The town hall in Semallé
- Location of Semallé
- Location within France Location within Normandy
- Coordinates: 48°28′32″N 0°09′03″E
- Country: France
- Region: Normandy
- Department: Orne
- Arrondissement: Alençon
- Canton: Écouves
- Intercommunality: CU Alençon

Government
  - Mayor (2020–2026): Jean-Patrick Leroux
- Area^{1}: 14.04 km^{2} (5.42 sq mi)
- Elevation: 147 m (482 ft)
- Highest elevation: 163 m (535 ft)
- Lowest elevation: 132 m (433 ft)
- Population (2023): 379
  - Density: 27.0/km^{2} (69.9/sq mi)
- Time zone: UTC+01:00 (CET)
  - Summer (DST): UTC+02:00 (CEST)
- INSEE/Postal code: 61467 /61250
- ^{1} French Land Register data, which excludes lakes, ponds, glaciers > 1 km^{2} (0.386 sq mi or 247 acres) and river estuaries.

Semallé (French pronunciation: [səmale]) is a commune in the Orne department in north-western France.

== Geography ==
The commune is made up of the following collection of villages and hamlets, L'Être aux Brisards, La Roberie, L'Être aux Gérards, Hauterive and Betz.

The commune is in the Normandie-Maine Regional Natural Park.

The commune along with another 32 communes is part of a 3,503 hectare, Natura 2000 conservation area, called the Haute vallée de la Sarthe.

The river Sarthe flows through the commune. In addition two rivers le Betz and la Forêt perambulate through the commune.

== Points of Interest ==
- Maison de sainte Thérèse is the house that Thérèse of Lisieux stayed at as a child between March 1873 and April 1874. The house today is set-up as a replica of what it would have been during this time.

== See also ==
- Communes of the Orne department
