= Saint-Ellier-les-Bois =

- Commune
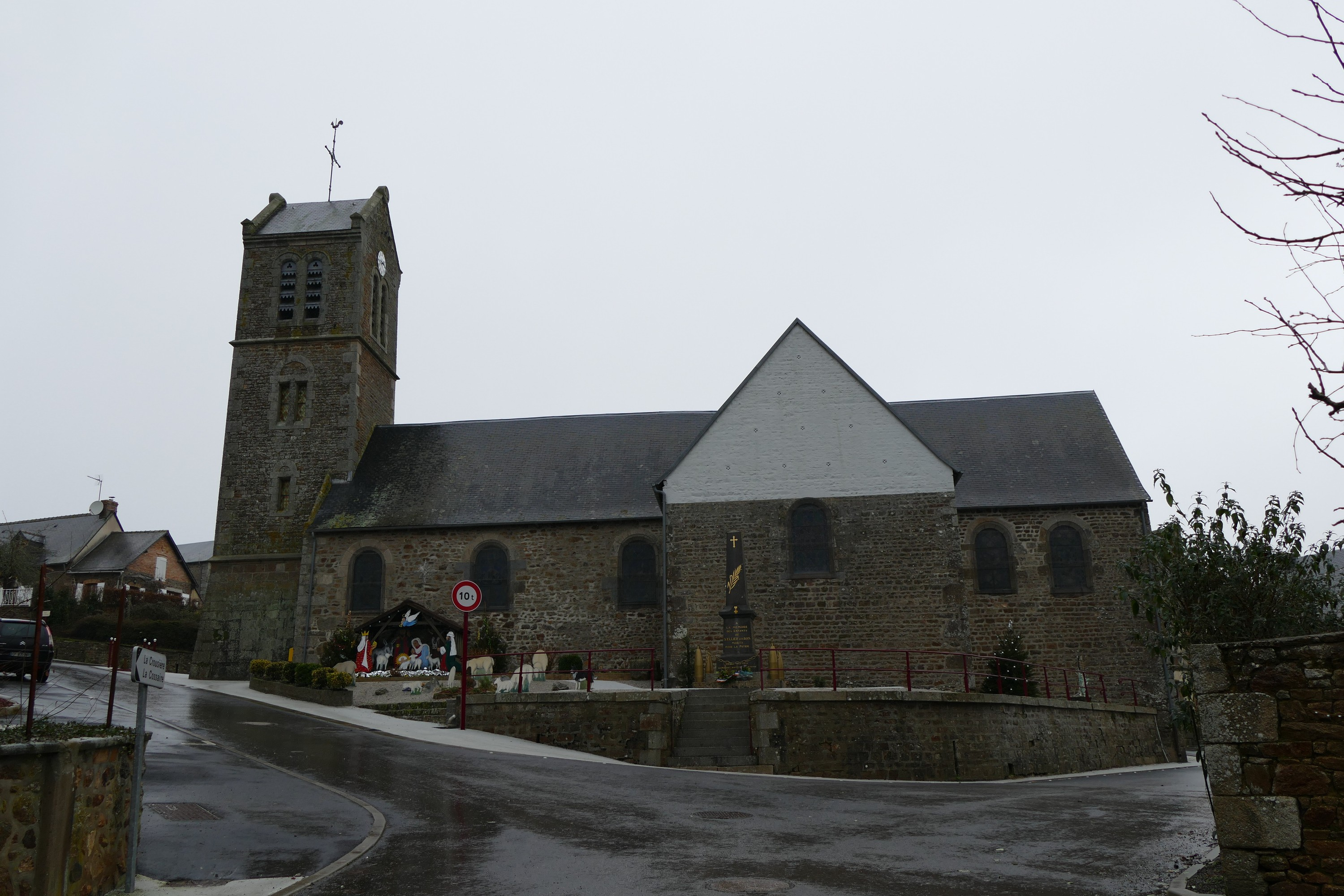
- The church in Saint-Ellier-les-Bois
- Location of Saint-Ellier-les-Bois
- Location within France Location within Normandy
- Coordinates: 48°31′15″N 0°05′38″W
- Country: France
- Region: Normandy
- Department: Orne
- Arrondissement: Alençon
- Canton: Magny-le-Désert
- Intercommunality: CU Alençon

Government
  - Mayor (2020–2026): Edgar Moulin
- Area^{1}: 13.68 km^{2} (5.28 sq mi)
- Elevation: 275 m (902 ft)
- Highest elevation: 367 m (1,204 ft)
- Lowest elevation: 217 m (712 ft)
- Population (2023): 254
  - Density: 18.6/km^{2} (48.1/sq mi)
- Time zone: UTC+01:00 (CET)
  - Summer (DST): UTC+02:00 (CEST)
- INSEE/Postal code: 61384 /61320
- ^{1} French Land Register data, which excludes lakes, ponds, glaciers > 1 km^{2} (0.386 sq mi or 247 acres) and river estuaries.

Saint-Ellier-les-Bois (French pronunciation: [sɛ̃.t‿ɛlje le bwa]) is a commune in the Orne department in north-western France.

== Geography ==
The commune is made up of the following collection of villages and hamlets, La Pitoisière, Les Hautes Rimbaudières, La Bouvardière, Le Sarthon, Saint-Ellier-les-Bois, La Guéferie, La Crousière, La Cossaire and La Guitardière.

The Sarthon river flows through the commune. In addition a stream, ruisseau de brûlon flows through the commune.

The Commune along with another 11 communes shares part of a 5,255 hectare, Natura 2000 conservation area, called the Vallée du Sarthon et affluents.

== See also ==
- Communes of the Orne department
- Parc naturel régional Normandie-Maine
