= La Roche-Mabile =

- Commune
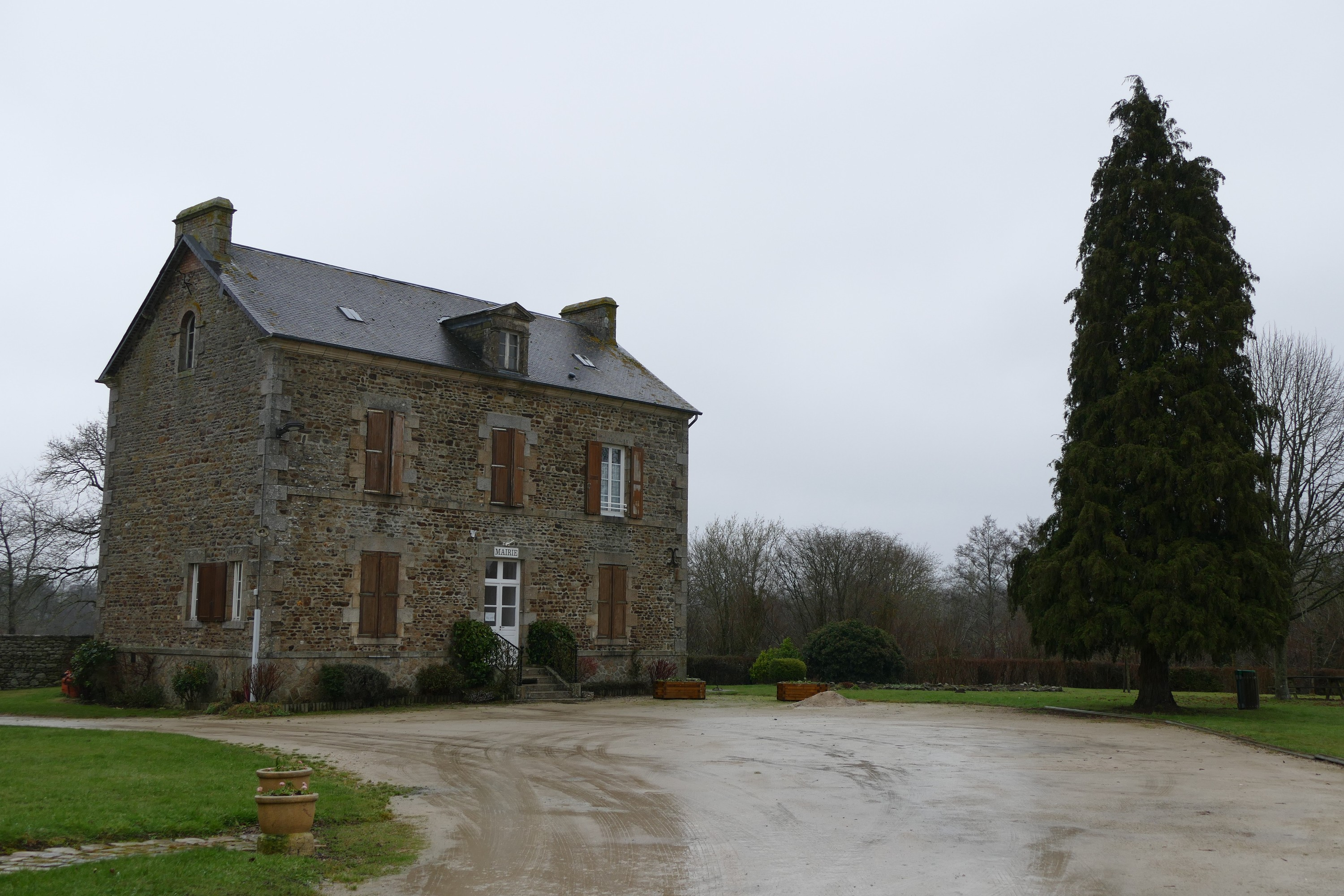
- The town hall in La Roche-Mabile
- Location of La Roche-Mabile
- Location within France Location within Normandy
- Coordinates: 48°29′26″N 0°03′00″W
- Country: France
- Region: Normandy
- Department: Orne
- Arrondissement: Alençon
- Canton: Damigny
- Intercommunality: CU Alençon

Government
  - Mayor (2020–2026): Michel Génois
- Area^{1}: 5.21 km^{2} (2.01 sq mi)
- Elevation: 211 m (692 ft)
- Highest elevation: 332 m (1,089 ft)
- Lowest elevation: 192 m (630 ft)
- Population (2023): 164
  - Density: 31.5/km^{2} (81.5/sq mi)
- Time zone: UTC+01:00 (CET)
  - Summer (DST): UTC+02:00 (CEST)
- INSEE/Postal code: 61350 /61420
- ^{1} French Land Register data, which excludes lakes, ponds, glaciers > 1 km^{2} (0.386 sq mi or 247 acres) and river estuaries.

La Roche-Mabile (French pronunciation: [la ʁɔʃ mabil]) is a commune in the Orne department in north-western France.

== Geography ==
The commune is made up of the following collection of villages and hamlets, Les Ruaux, Haute-ville and La Roche-Mabile.

The Sarthon river flows through the commune.

The commune is in the Normandie-Maine Regional Natural Park.

The Commune along with another 11 communes shares part of a 5,255 hectare, Natura 2000 conservation area, called the Vallée du Sarthon et affluents.

The commune along with 26 others contains part of the Forêt d'Écouves.

== Points of interest ==
=== National heritage sites ===
- Saint-Pierre Church a fifteenth century church, that incorporates some of the original features of an eleventh century monastery that existed before the church. It was registered as a Monument historique in 1975.

== See also ==
- Communes of the Orne department
- Parc naturel régional Normandie-Maine
