= Saint-Didier-sous-Écouves =

- Part of L'Orée-d'Écouves
- Location of Saint-Didier-sous-Écouves
- Location within France Location within Normandy
- Coordinates: 48°32′17″N 0°02′10″W
- Country: France
- Region: Normandy
- Department: Orne
- Arrondissement: Alençon
- Canton: Magny-le-Désert
- Commune: L'Orée-d'Écouves
- Area^{1}: 8.78 km^{2} (3.39 sq mi)
- Elevation: 300 m (980 ft)
- Highest elevation: 412 m (1,352 ft)
- Lowest elevation: 233 m (764 ft)
- Population (2022): 133
  - Density: 15.1/km^{2} (39.2/sq mi)
- Time zone: UTC+01:00 (CET)
  - Summer (DST): UTC+02:00 (CEST)
- Postal code: 61320
- ^{1} French Land Register data, which excludes lakes, ponds, glaciers > 1 km^{2} (0.386 sq mi or 247 acres) and river estuaries.

Saint-Didier-sous-Écouves (French pronunciation: [sɛ̃ didje su.z‿ekuv]) is a former commune in the Orne department in north-western France. On 1 January 2019, it was merged into the new commune L'Orée-d'Écouves.

== Notable buildings and places ==
- Markers of Forêt d'Écouves a set of 80 markers positioned in the 18th century that mark the boundaries of the forest, they were registered as a Monument historique in 1987.

== See also ==
- Communes of the Orne department
- Parc naturel régional Normandie-Maine
