= Livaie =

- Part of L'Orée-d'Écouves
- Location of Livaie
- Location within France Location within Normandy
- Coordinates: 48°30′55″N 0°01′55″W
- Country: France
- Region: Normandy
- Department: Orne
- Arrondissement: Alençon
- Canton: Magny-le-Désert
- Commune: L'Orée-d'Écouves
- Area^{1}: 12.46 km^{2} (4.81 sq mi)
- Elevation: 305 m (1,001 ft)
- Highest elevation: 378 m (1,240 ft)
- Lowest elevation: 197 m (646 ft)
- Population (2022): 215
  - Density: 17.3/km^{2} (44.7/sq mi)
- Time zone: UTC+01:00 (CET)
  - Summer (DST): UTC+02:00 (CEST)
- Postal code: 61420
- ^{1} French Land Register data, which excludes lakes, ponds, glaciers > 1 km^{2} (0.386 sq mi or 247 acres) and river estuaries.

Livaie (French pronunciation: [livɛ]) is a former commune in the Orne department in north-western France. On 1 January 2019, it was merged into the new commune L'Orée-d'Écouves.

== See also ==
- Communes of the Orne department
- Parc naturel régional Normandie-Maine
