= Cerisy-Belle-Étoile =

- Commune
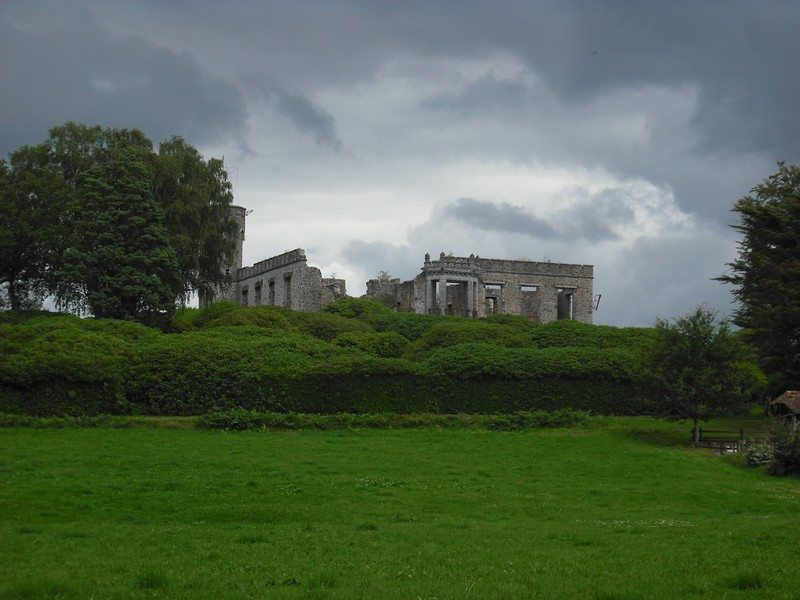
- The ruins of the chateau in Cerisy
- Location of Cerisy-Belle-Étoile
- Location within France Location within Normandy
- Coordinates: 48°47′54″N 0°37′31″W
- Country: France
- Region: Normandy
- Department: Orne
- Arrondissement: Argentan
- Canton: Flers-1
- Intercommunality: CA Flers Agglo

Government
  - Mayor (2020–2026): Hervé Borderie
- Area^{1}: 13.40 km^{2} (5.17 sq mi)
- Highest elevation: 256 m (840 ft)
- Lowest elevation: 102 m (335 ft)
- Population (2023): 693
  - Density: 51.7/km^{2} (134/sq mi)
- Demonym: Ceriséens ou Estoliens
- Time zone: UTC+01:00 (CET)
  - Summer (DST): UTC+02:00 (CEST)
- INSEE/Postal code: 61078 /61100
- ^{1} French Land Register data, which excludes lakes, ponds, glaciers > 1 km^{2} (0.386 sq mi or 247 acres) and river estuaries.

Cerisy-Belle-Étoile is a commune in the Orne department in north-western France.

== Geography ==
The commune is part of the area known as Suisse Normande.

The commune is made up of the following collection of villages and hamlets: La Monnerie, La Perrière, La Morlandière, La Vallerie, La Jehannière, Les Haies, Les Loges, La Gaumonnière, L'Abbaye de Belle Étoile, La Hagrie, Épivent, Visance and Cerisy-Belle-Étoile.

The commune is traversed by the Noireau and Visance rivers, as well as the Fontaines stream.

== Points of Interest ==
- The communal forest of Cerisy-Belle-Etoile is a 90 hectare forest open to the public.

=== National heritage sites ===
- The former Abbey of Belle-Etoile is a thirteenth century former abbey established after the conquest of Normandy by Philip II of France. It was made a Monument historique in 1926.
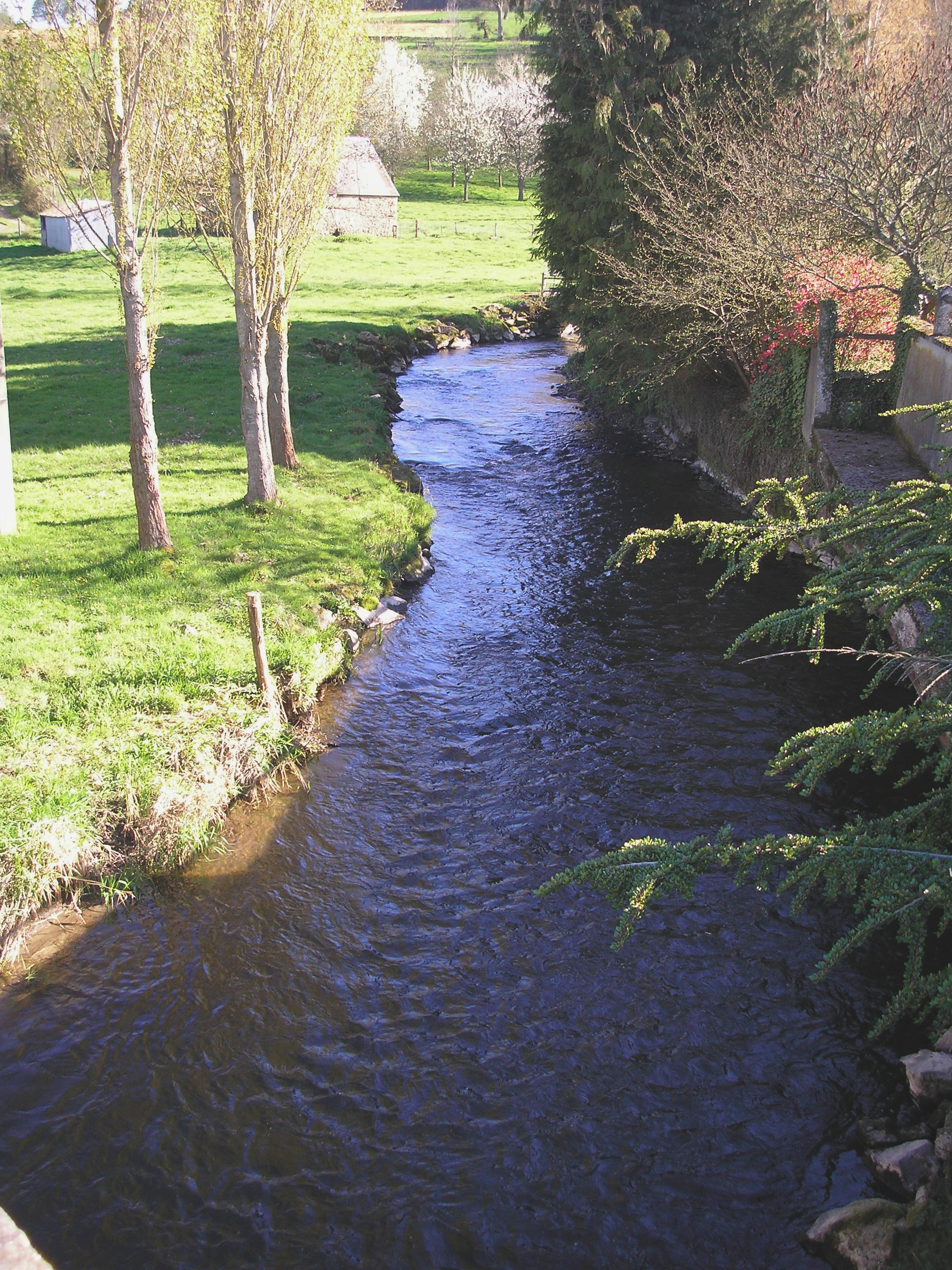
Noireau River in Cerisy-Belle-Étoile

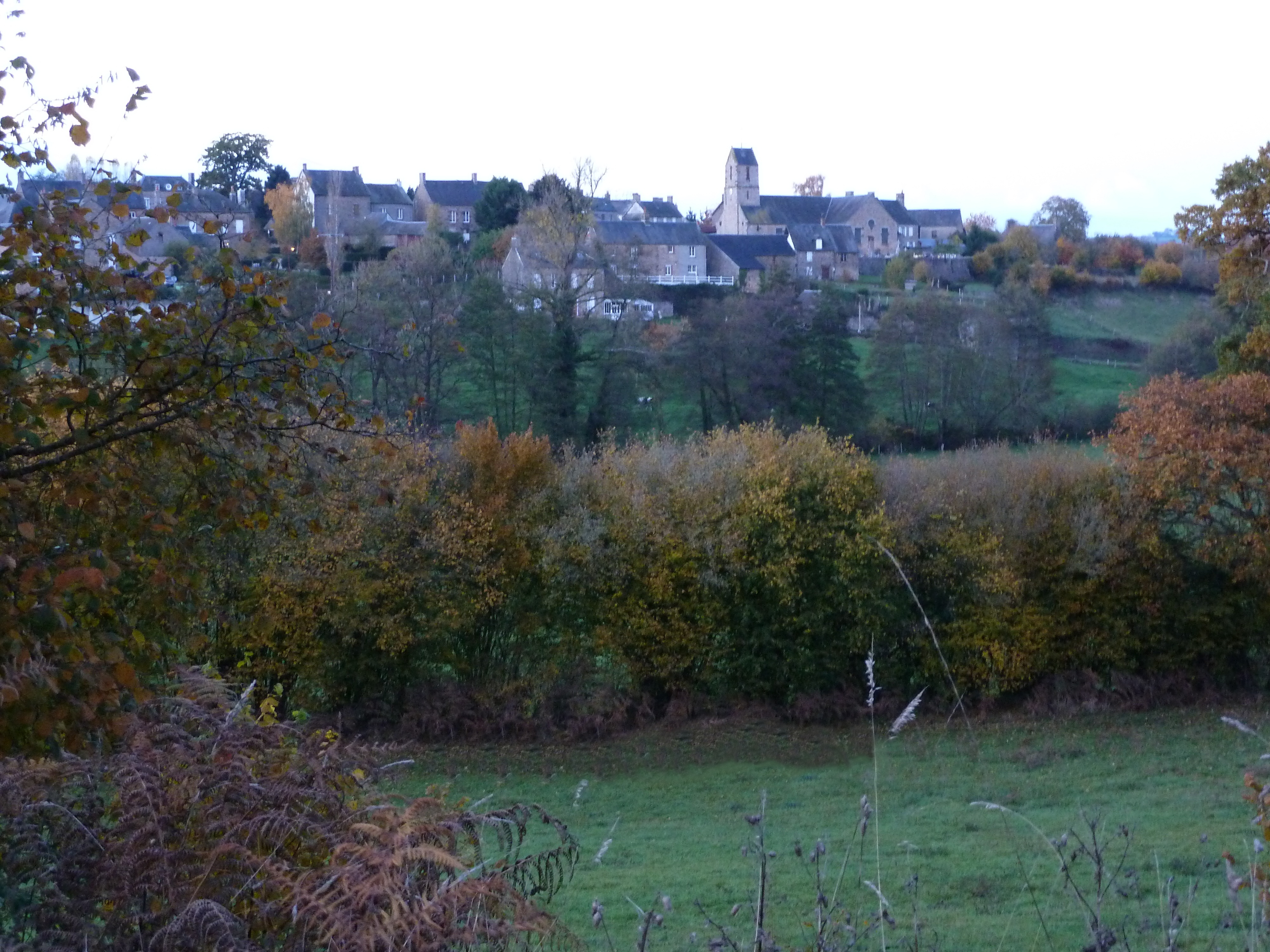
Le Bourg in Cerisy-Belle-Etoile

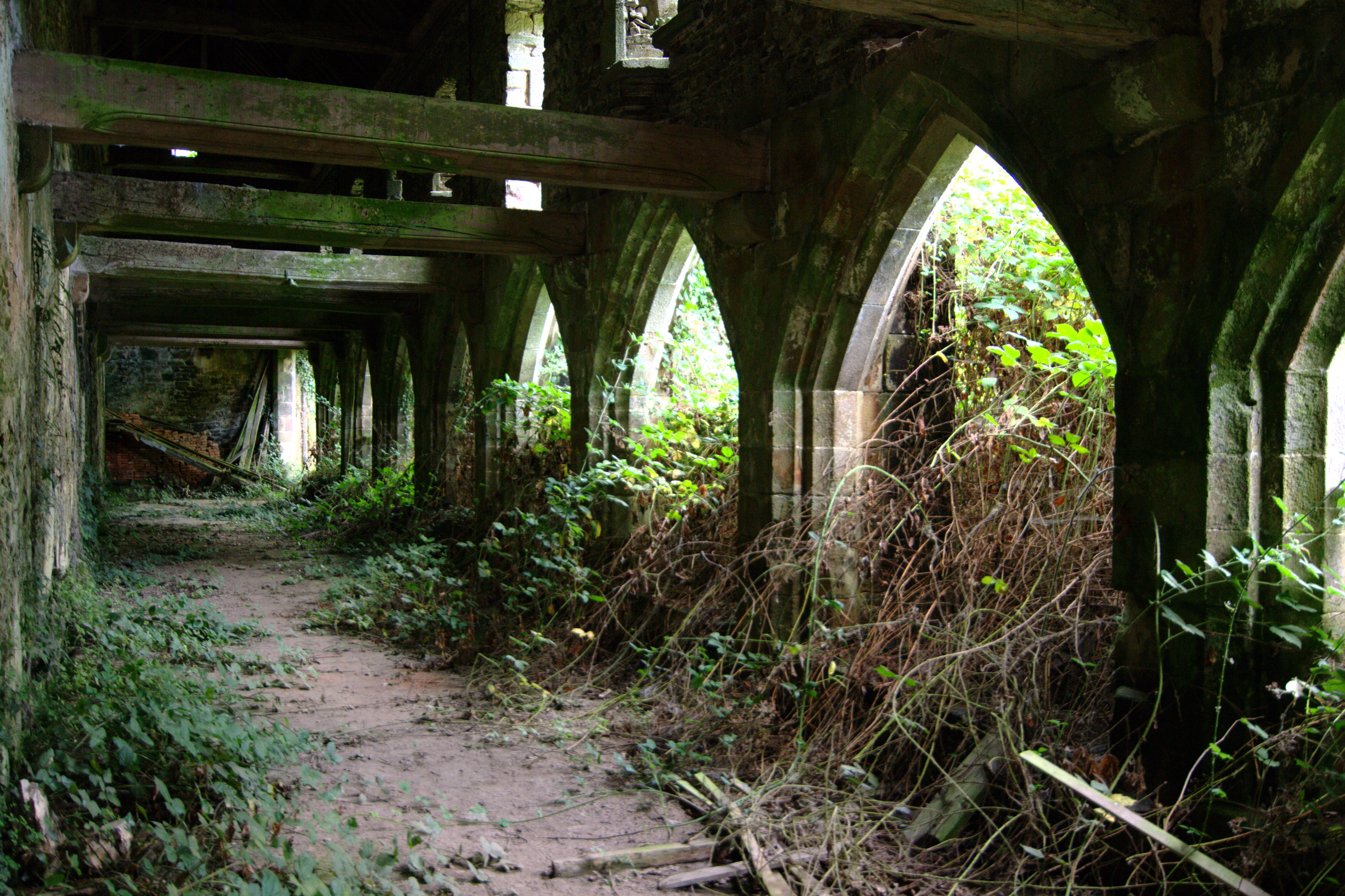
Abbaye de Belle-Étoile

== Culture ==
- Les Bichoiseries is an annual Contemporary music festival each June that occurs on Mount Cerisy. It attracts about 6,600 visitors per year. The festival has been going since 2005, originally hosted in La Chapelle-Biche before moving to Cerisy-Belle-Étoile in 2013.

== People linked with the commune ==
- Étienne de Veniard, Sieur de Bourgmont (1679 – 1734), a French explorer who documented his travels across North America was born here, and later buried here.

== See also ==
- Communes of the Orne department
