= La Bazoque =

La Bazoque may refer to:

- La Bazoque, Calvados, a commune in France
- La Bazoque, Orne, a commune in France
