= Le Châtellier =

Le Châtellier is the name of two communes in France:

- Le Châtellier, Ille-et-Vilaine
- Le Châtellier, Orne
