= Ernest Maunoury =

French flying ace

Ernest Joseph Jules Maunoury
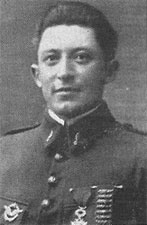
- Born: 20 November 1894; Saint-Clair-de-Halouze
- Died: 21 September 1921 (aged 26); Cazaux
- Burial place: Saint-Clair-de-Halouze
- Military career
- Allegiance: France
- Branch: Infantry; aviation
- Rank: Sous lieutenant
- Units: 24e Regiment d'Infanterie; Escadrille 64; Escadrille 16; Escadrille 152
- Awards: Médaille militaire Croix de Guerre with seven Palmes and one étoile de vermeil Mentioned in Dispatches twice

Sous Lieutenant Ernest Joseph Jules Maunoury was a French flying ace during World War I. He was credited with eleven confirmed aerial victories. He survived the war, only to die in a flying accident on 21 September 1921.

== Early life ==
Ernest Joseph Jules Maunoury was born in Saint-Clair-de-Halouze on 29 November 1894.

== World War I ==
Manoury joined the French military on 7 September 1914, being assigned to the 24e Regiment d'Infanterie. On 19 February 1915, he was promoted to Sergeant; not quite a year later, on 16 February 1916, he was mentioned in his brigade's orders. He was seriously wounded in action and offered the opportunity to transfer out of combat; however, he elected to volunteer for aviation duty. On 2 June 1916, he transferred to flying service. His first assignment was to Escadrille 64 as a gunner/observer. On 26 September 1916, he downed a Fokker; this initial victory gained him another mention in dispatches, on 7 October.

On 27 January 1917, he was transferred to Escadrille 16. He began pilot's training at Dijon on 20 March 1917, and was granted his Military Pilot's Brevet on 7 June 1917. He then joined a brand new squadron, Escadrille 152, as a Spad pilot. On 30 June 1918, he scored his second victory, destroying a German observation balloon. On 20 July, he shared a double win with Del Vial. Then he began a string of seven consecutive victories shared with premium balloon buster Léon Bourjade. Double victories on 15 September and 1 October 1918 brought his tally to eight enemy observation balloons destroyed, along with two German reconnaissance planes and a Fokker.

== Postwar ==
He lost a wing while flying over Cazaux on 21 September 1921. The subsequent impact was fatal.

== Honors and awards ==
Chevalier de la Légion d'Honneur
"Officer of high moral values. Severely wounded in the infantry where he was remarkable because of his audacity. He refused an assignment to auxiliary service and entered aviation at his request as an observer. After having downed one enemy plane he was transferred to pursuit aviation where he has never ceased to demonstrate the noble qualities of spirit, energy and bravery. On 15 September 1918, in the course of a patrol, he flamed two enemy observation balloons. Two wounds, three enemy planes and six balloons downed. Four citations." Chevalier de la Légion d'Honneur citation, 9 October 1918.
