= Saint-Paul, Orne =

Saint-Paul
- Commune
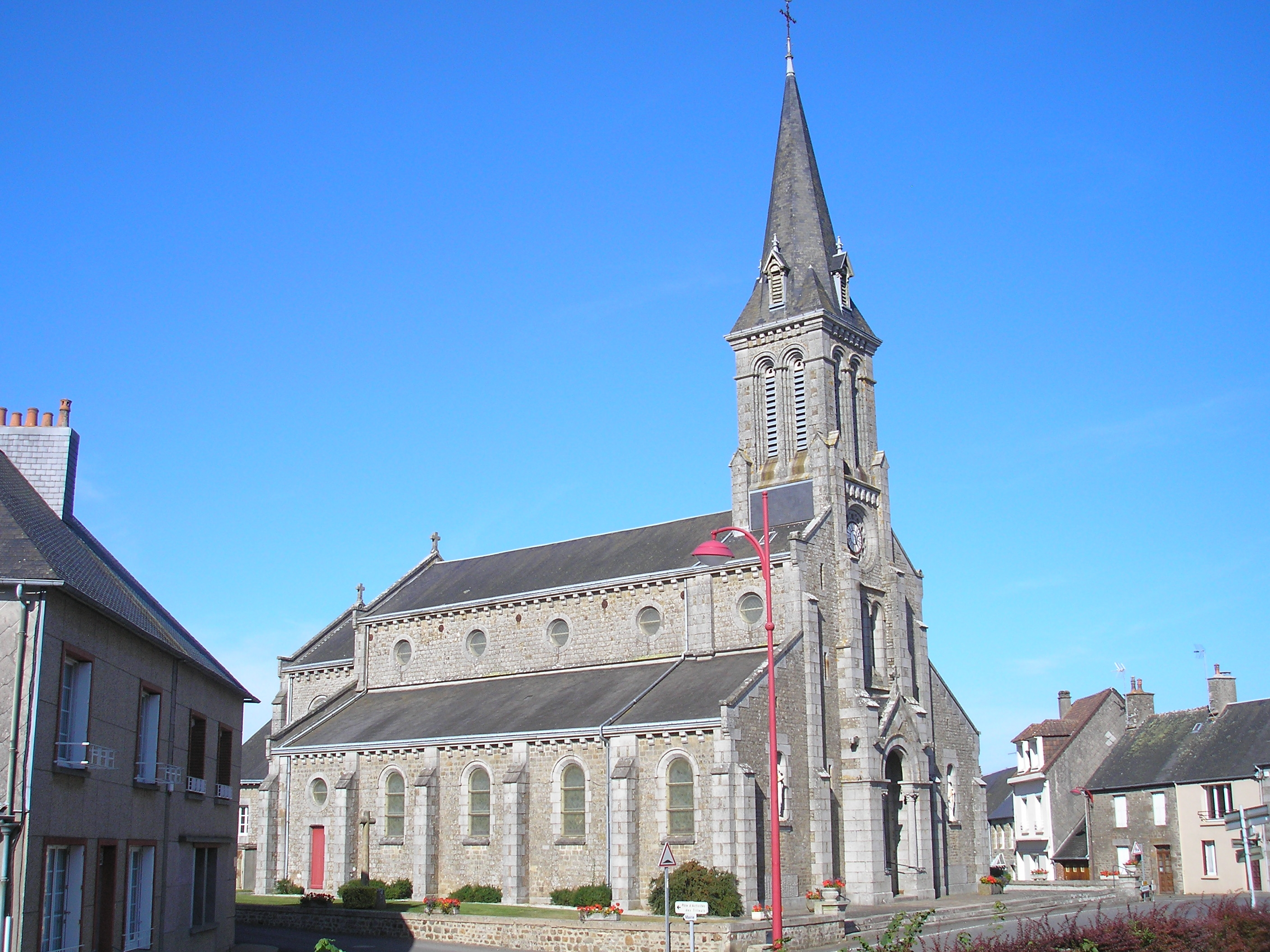
- The church in Saint-Paul
- Location of Saint-Paul
- Location within France Location within Normandy
- Coordinates: 48°44′37″N 0°37′53″W
- Country: France
- Region: Normandy
- Department: Orne
- Arrondissement: Argentan
- Canton: Flers-1
- Intercommunality: CA Flers Agglo

Government
  - Mayor (2022–2026): Jean-Marie Pothé
- Area^{1}: 7.96 km^{2} (3.07 sq mi)
- Elevation: 273 m (896 ft)
- Highest elevation: 294 m (965 ft)
- Lowest elevation: 193 m (633 ft)
- Population (2023): 631
  - Density: 79.3/km^{2} (205/sq mi)
- Time zone: UTC+01:00 (CET)
  - Summer (DST): UTC+02:00 (CEST)
- INSEE/Postal code: 61443 /61100
- ^{1} French Land Register data, which excludes lakes, ponds, glaciers > 1 km^{2} (0.386 sq mi or 247 acres) and river estuaries.

Saint-Paul (French pronunciation: [sɛ̃ pɔl]) is a commune in the Orne department in north-western France.

== Geography ==
The commune is made up of the following collection of villages and hamlets, Le Hamel Dauphy, Le Val Saulnier, Launay Vénieux, Saint-Paul, La Jambiére, L'Hodiesnière, La Pannetière and La Barrère.

Two rivers, La Visance and Le Hariel flow through the commune. In addition two streams also traverse the commune the Ruisseau de Noire Vallee and La Gomondiere.

== See also ==
- Communes of the Orne department
