= Le Ménil-de-Briouze =

- Commune
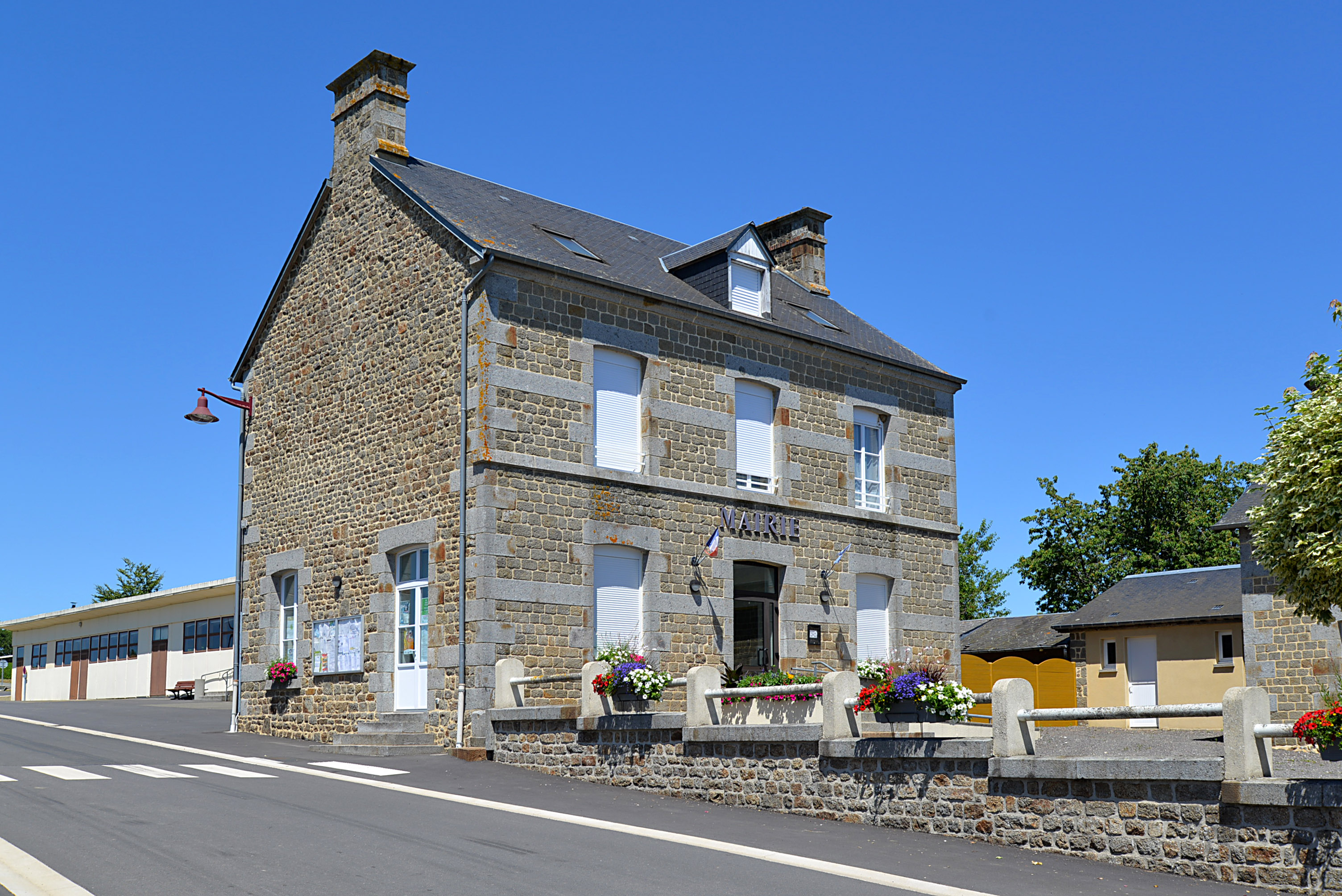
- The town hall in Le Ménil-de-Briouze
- Location of Le Ménil-de-Briouze
- Location within France Location within Normandy
- Coordinates: 48°40′36″N 0°23′54″W
- Country: France
- Region: Normandy
- Department: Orne
- Arrondissement: Argentan
- Canton: Athis-Val de Rouvre
- Intercommunality: CA Flers Agglo

Government
  - Mayor (2020–2026): Jean-Marie Delange
- Area^{1}: 21.39 km^{2} (8.26 sq mi)
- Elevation: 240 m (790 ft)
- Highest elevation: 345 m (1,132 ft)
- Lowest elevation: 204 m (669 ft)
- Population (2023): 541
  - Density: 25.3/km^{2} (65.5/sq mi)
- Time zone: UTC+01:00 (CET)
  - Summer (DST): UTC+02:00 (CEST)
- INSEE/Postal code: 61260 /61220
- ^{1} French Land Register data, which excludes lakes, ponds, glaciers > 1 km^{2} (0.386 sq mi or 247 acres) and river estuaries.

Le Ménil-de-Briouze (French pronunciation: [lə menil də bʁijuz], literally Le Ménil of Briouze) is a commune in the Orne department in north-western France.

== Geography ==
The commune is made up of the following collection of villages and hamlets, La Charpenterie, Le Ménil-de-Briouze, Le Chesné, Arthan, Les Roussières and La Morière.

It is 2,520 hectares (9.7 sq mi) in size. The highest point in the commune is 220 metres (720 ft).

Five streams, the Laurenciere, la Source Philippe, the Arthan, the Roussieres and the Lange are the only watercourses that flow through the commune.

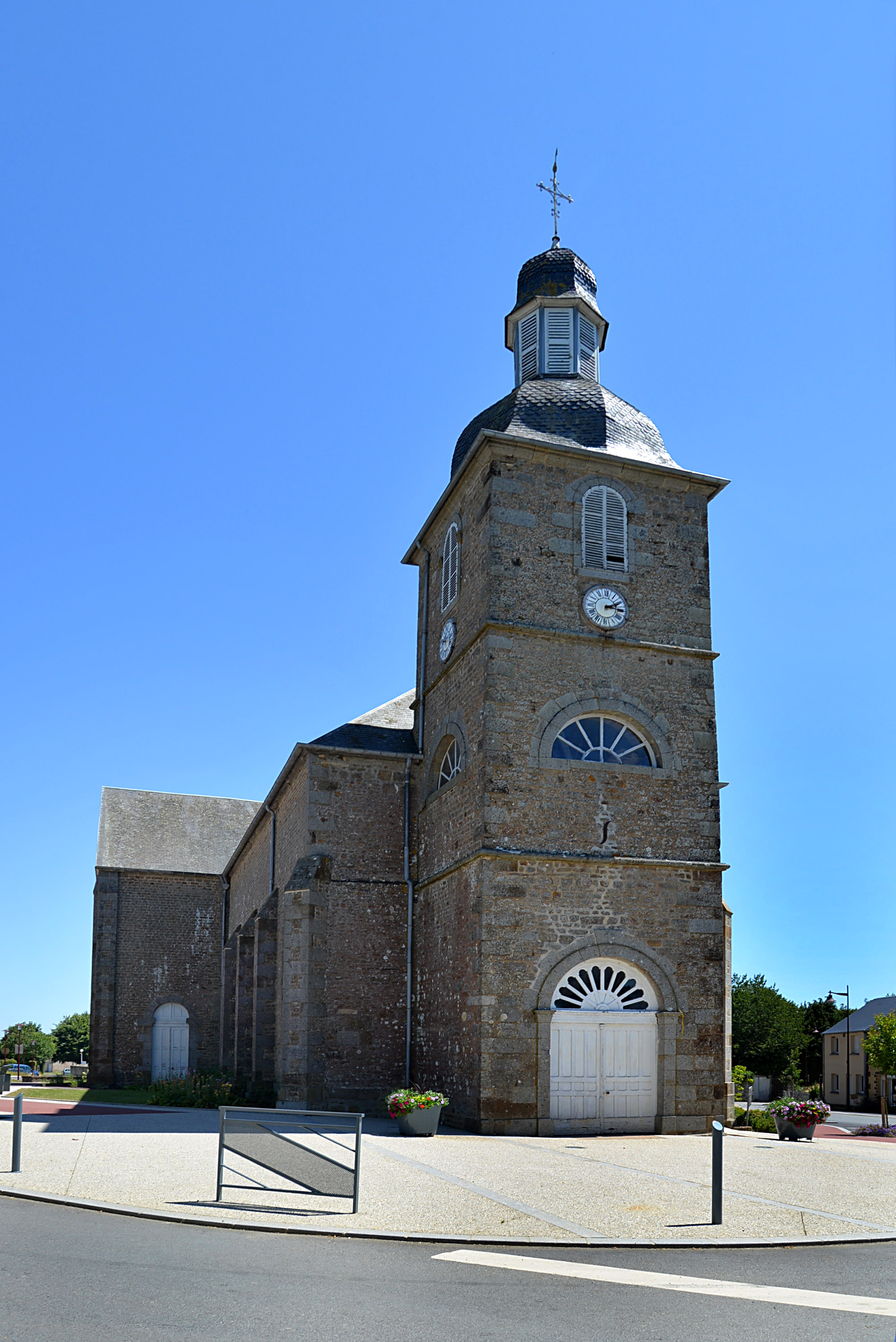
Church of Notre-Dame in Ménil-de-Briouze

== See also ==
- Communes of the Orne department
