= Durcet =

- Commune
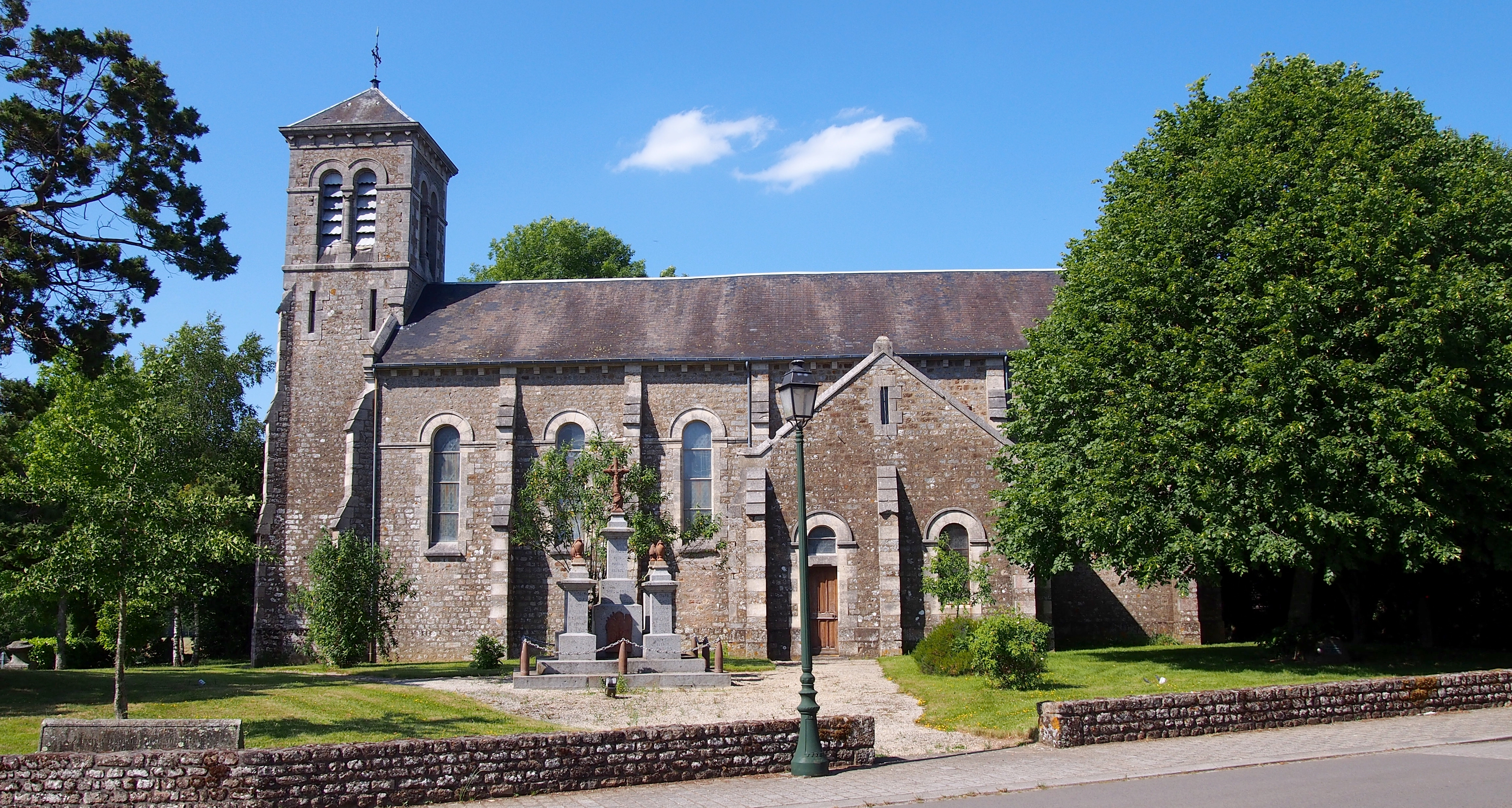
- The church in Durcet
- Location of Durcet
- Location within France Location within Normandy
- Coordinates: 48°44′52″N 0°26′05″W
- Country: France
- Region: Normandy
- Department: Orne
- Arrondissement: Argentan
- Canton: Athis-Val de Rouvre
- Intercommunality: CA Flers Agglo

Government
  - Mayor (2020–2026): Gérard Pierre
- Area^{1}: 9.54 km^{2} (3.68 sq mi)
- Elevation: 243 m (797 ft)
- Highest elevation: 275 m (902 ft)
- Lowest elevation: 198 m (650 ft)
- Population (2023): 286
  - Density: 30.0/km^{2} (77.6/sq mi)
- Time zone: UTC+01:00 (CET)
  - Summer (DST): UTC+02:00 (CEST)
- INSEE/Postal code: 61148 /61100
- ^{1} French Land Register data, which excludes lakes, ponds, glaciers > 1 km^{2} (0.386 sq mi or 247 acres) and river estuaries.

Durcet (French pronunciation: [dyʁsɛ]) is a commune in the Orne department in north-western France.

== Geography ==
The commune is part of the area known as Suisse Normande.

The commune is made up of the following collection of villages and hamlets, Le Val, Le Baux, La Grande Ferme, La Maurinais, Le Mesnil Logis, Magny and Durcet.

The commune has seven watercourses running through it the river Gine and a stream the Onfrairies.

== See also ==
- Communes of the Orne department
