= Sainte-Opportune =

- Commune
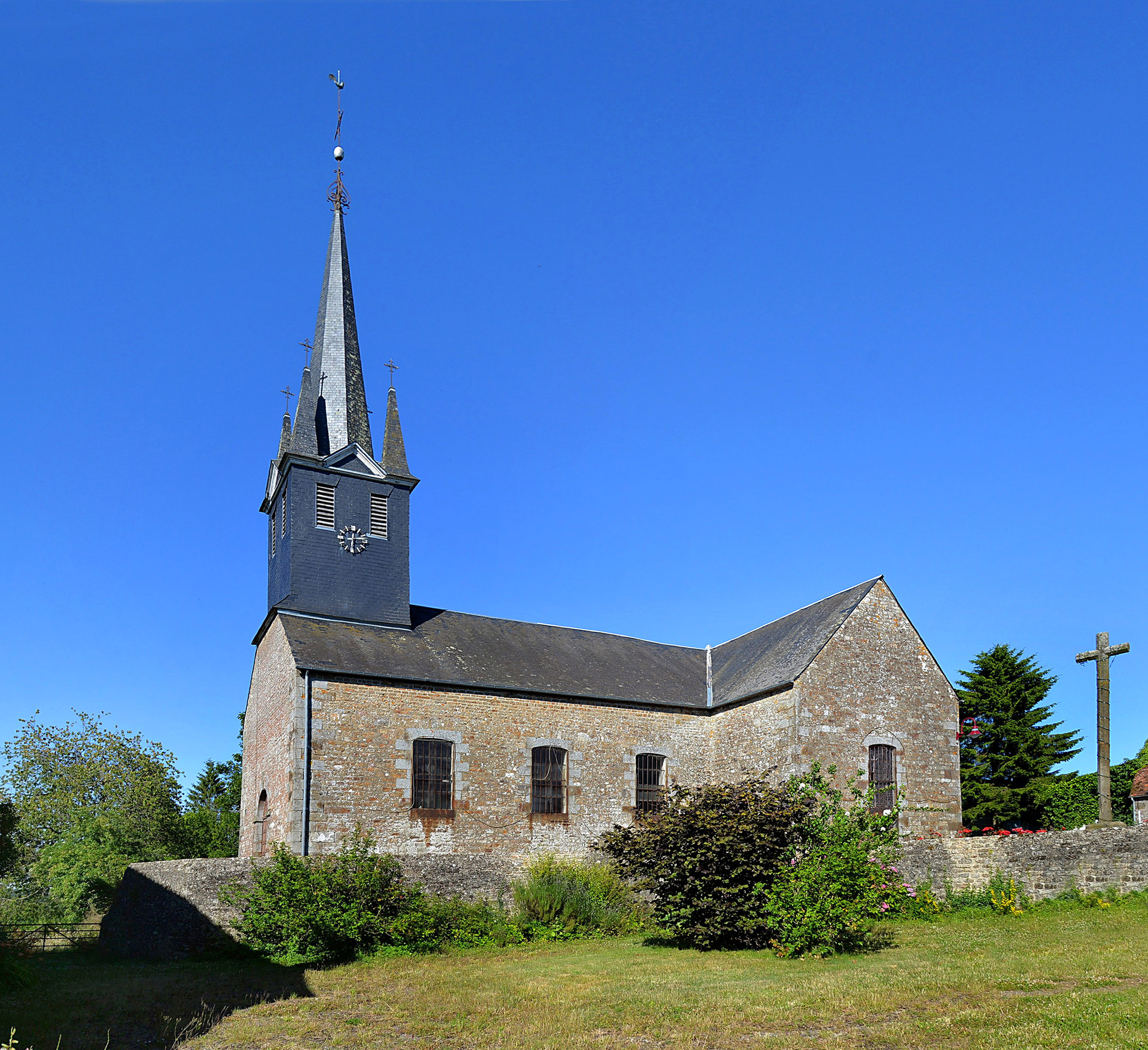
- The church in Sainte-Opportune
- Location of Sainte-Opportune
- Location within France Location within Normandy
- Coordinates: 48°44′33″N 0°24′55″W
- Country: France
- Region: Normandy
- Department: Orne
- Arrondissement: Argentan
- Canton: Athis-Val de Rouvre
- Intercommunality: CA Flers Agglo

Government
  - Mayor (2020–2026): Marc Simon
- Area^{1}: 8.46 km^{2} (3.27 sq mi)
- Highest elevation: 277 m (909 ft)
- Lowest elevation: 173 m (568 ft)
- Population (2023): 244
  - Density: 28.8/km^{2} (74.7/sq mi)
- Time zone: UTC+01:00 (CET)
  - Summer (DST): UTC+02:00 (CEST)
- INSEE/Postal code: 61436 /61100
- ^{1} French Land Register data, which excludes lakes, ponds, glaciers > 1 km^{2} (0.386 sq mi or 247 acres) and river estuaries.

Sainte-Opportune (French pronunciation: [sɛ̃t ɔpɔʁtyn]) is a commune in the Orne department of north-western France.

== Geography ==
The commune is part of the area known as Suisse Normande.

The commune is made up of the following collection of villages and hamlets, La Hiboudière,Le Fay, La Besnardière, La Saussaie,Le Grand Ros and Sainte-Opportune.

The commune has two watercourses running through it the river Rouvre and a stream the Prevostiere.

== See also ==
- Communes of the Orne department
