= Caligny =

- Commune
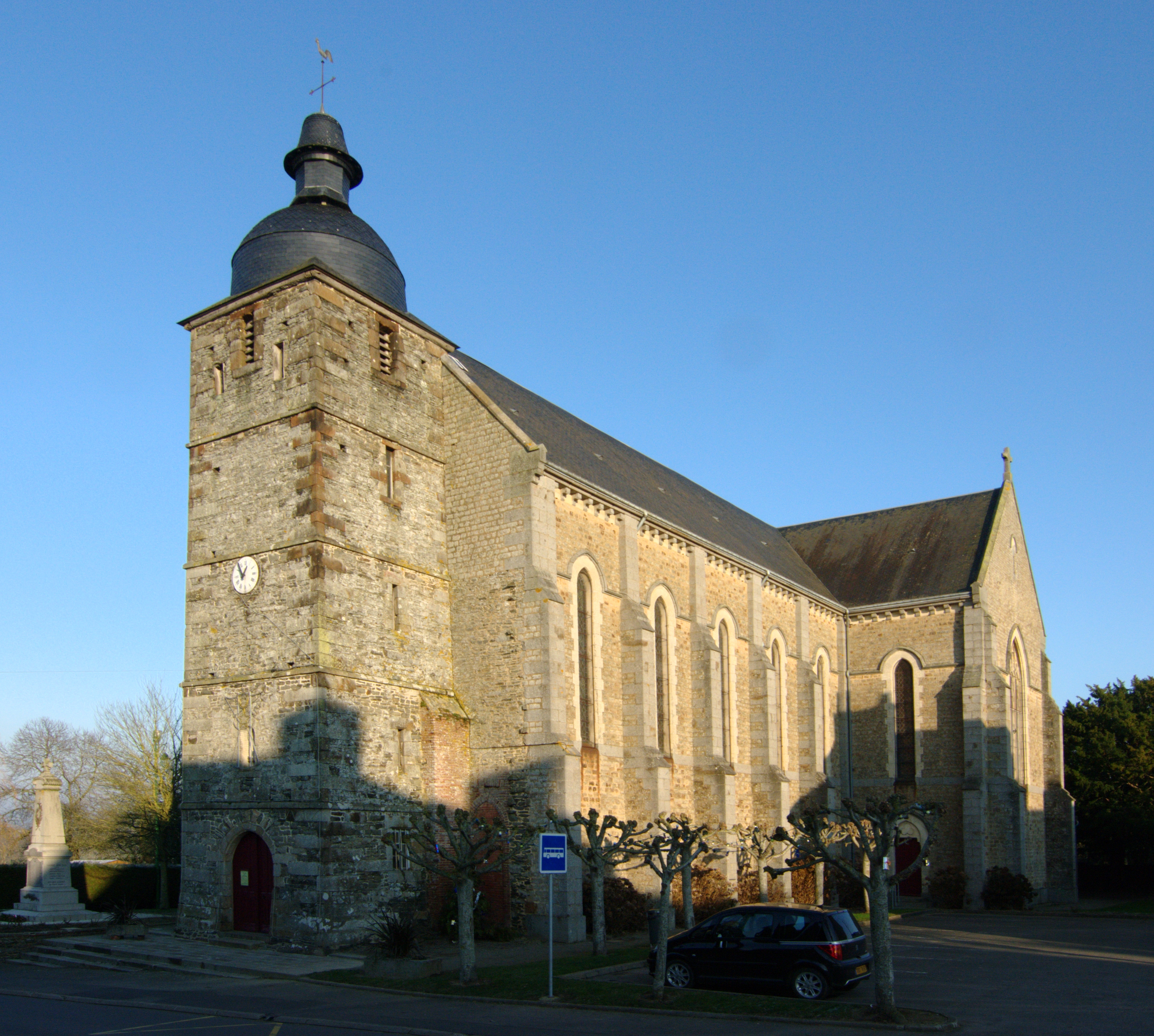
- The church in Caligny

- Coat of arms
- Location of Caligny
- Location within France Location within Normandy
- Coordinates: 48°48′31″N 0°35′41″W
- Country: France
- Region: Normandy
- Department: Orne
- Arrondissement: Argentan
- Canton: Flers-1
- Intercommunality: CA Flers Agglo

Government
  - Mayor (2020–2026): Gilles Rabache
- Area^{1}: 14.97 km^{2} (5.78 sq mi)
- Elevation: 109 m (358 ft)
- Highest elevation: 210 m (690 ft)
- Lowest elevation: 89 m (292 ft)
- Population (2023): 845
  - Density: 56.4/km^{2} (146/sq mi)
- Demonym: Caligniens
- Time zone: UTC+01:00 (CET)
  - Summer (DST): UTC+02:00 (CEST)
- INSEE/Postal code: 61070 /61100
- ^{1} French Land Register data, which excludes lakes, ponds, glaciers > 1 km^{2} (0.386 sq mi or 247 acres) and river estuaries.

Caligny (French pronunciation: [kaliɲi]) is a commune in the Orne department in north-western France.

== Geography ==
The commune is part of the area known as Suisse Normande.

The commune is made up of the following collection of villages and hamlets, Le Pertiller,La Boulière and Caligny.

The commune has 5 watercourses running through it three rivers the Noireau, Visance & La Vere, and two streams the Aubusson & Vallee.

== Heraldry ==
Arms of Caligny	The arms of Caligny are blazoned : Sable, 3 eagles wings lowered Or.

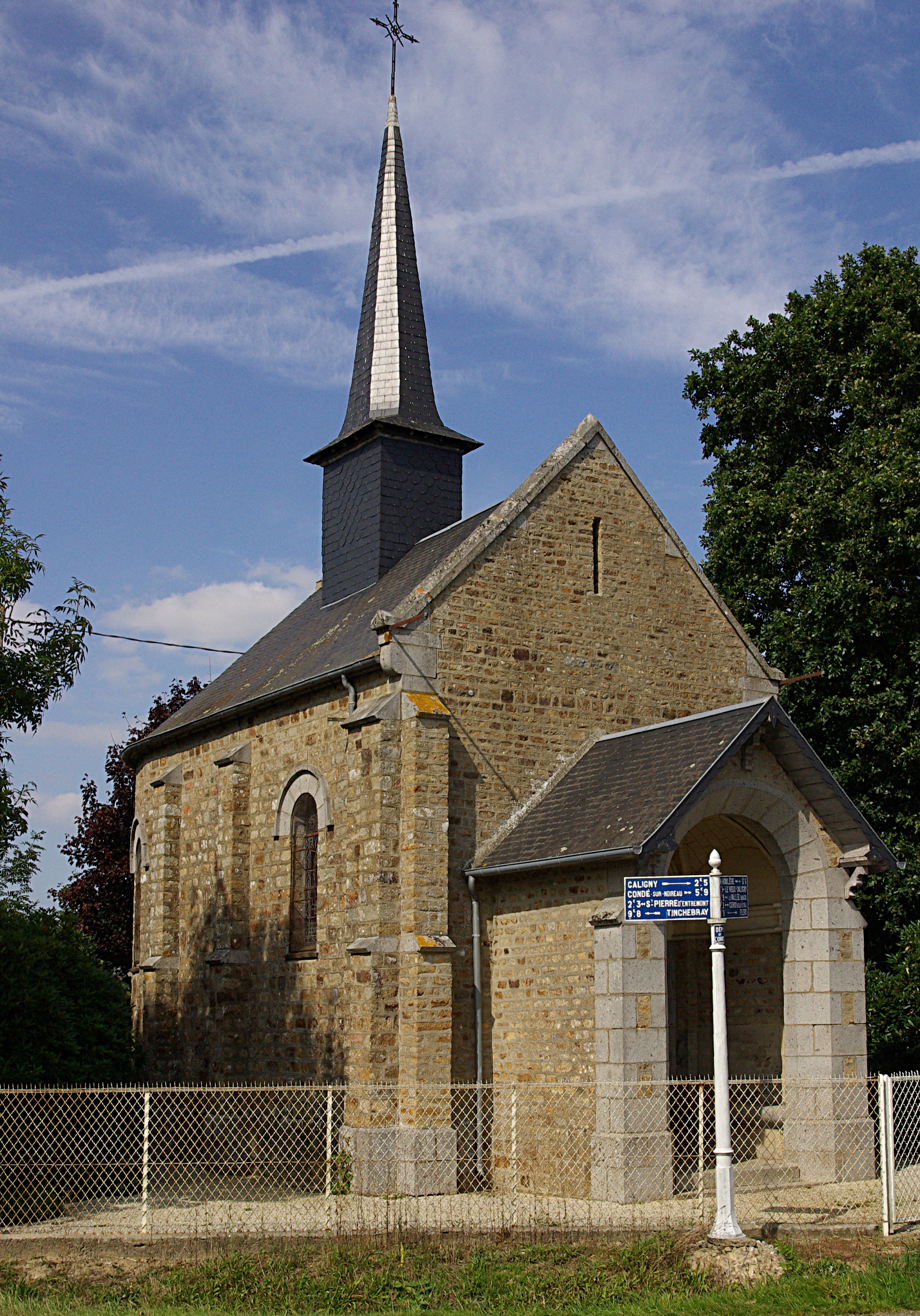
Notre-Dame du Chene

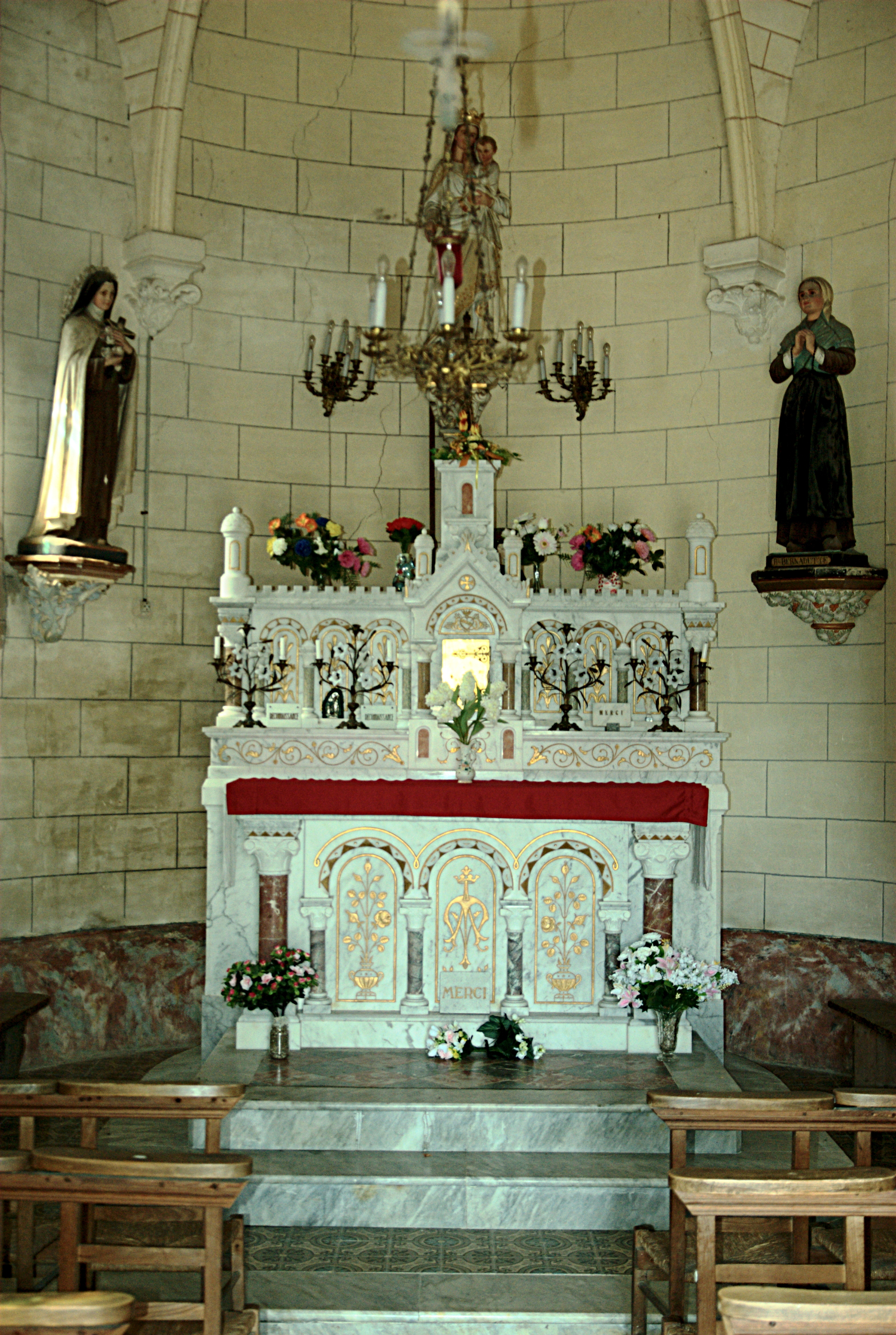
Notre-Dame du Chene inside

== Notable people ==
- Claude Lechatellier (Born 1946) - a French former cyclist was born here.

== See also ==
- Communes of the Orne department
