= La Lande-Saint-Siméon =

- Commune
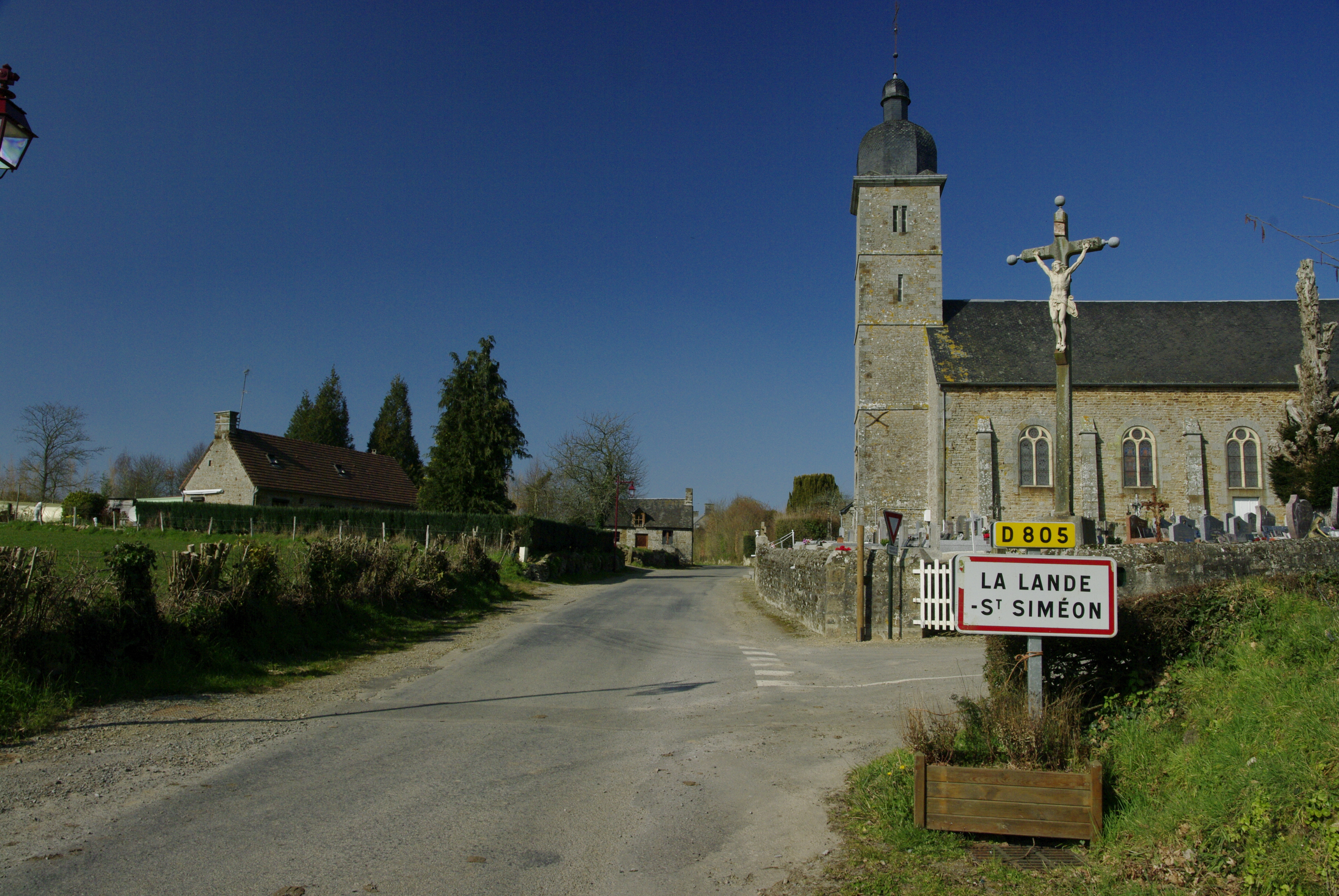
- The church in La Lande-Saint-Siméon
- Location of La Lande-Saint-Siméon
- Location within France Location within Normandy
- Coordinates: 48°49′23″N 0°26′05″W
- Country: France
- Region: Normandy
- Department: Orne
- Arrondissement: Argentan
- Canton: Athis-Val de Rouvre
- Intercommunality: CA Flers Agglo

Government
  - Mayor (2020–2026): Didier Delaporte
- Area^{1}: 5.33 km^{2} (2.06 sq mi)
- Elevation: 120 m (390 ft)
- Highest elevation: 227 m (745 ft)
- Lowest elevation: 104 m (341 ft)
- Population (2023): 166
  - Density: 31.1/km^{2} (80.7/sq mi)
- Time zone: UTC+01:00 (CET)
  - Summer (DST): UTC+02:00 (CEST)
- INSEE/Postal code: 61219 /61100
- ^{1} French Land Register data, which excludes lakes, ponds, glaciers > 1 km^{2} (0.386 sq mi or 247 acres) and river estuaries.

La Lande-Saint-Siméon (French pronunciation: [la lɑ̃d sɛ̃ simeɔ̃]) is a commune in the Orne department in north-western France.

== Geography ==
The commune is part of the area known as Suisse Normande.

The commune is made up of the following collection of villages and hamlets, Les Bourbes,Le Mâly, La Croûte, Lorièe de Bas and La Lande-Saint-Siméon.

The commune has a single watercourse, La Courteille that runs through the commune.

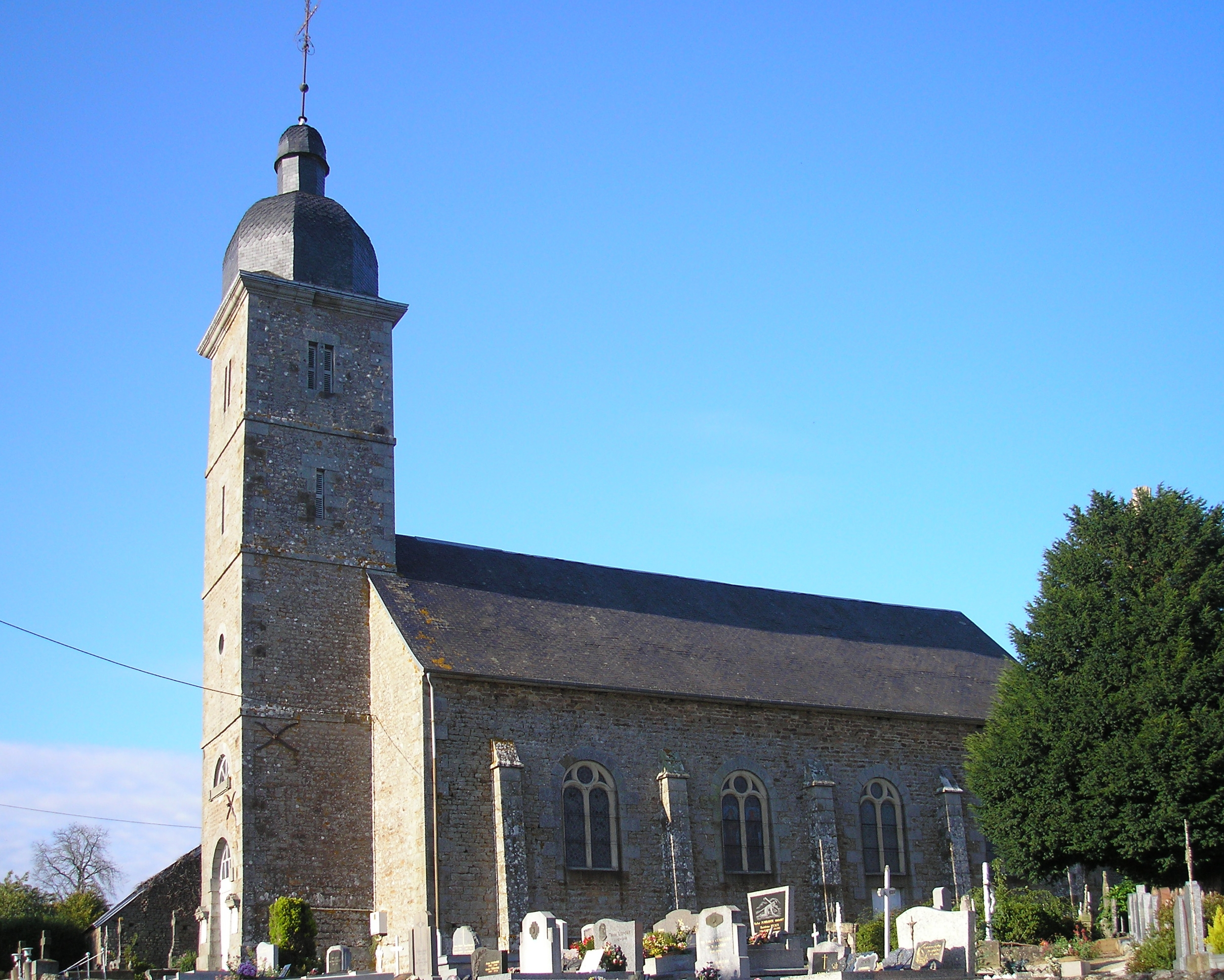
La Lande-Saint-Simeon church

== See also ==
- Communes of the Orne department
