= Saint-Pierre-d'Entremont, Orne =

Saint-Pierre-d'Entremont
- Commune
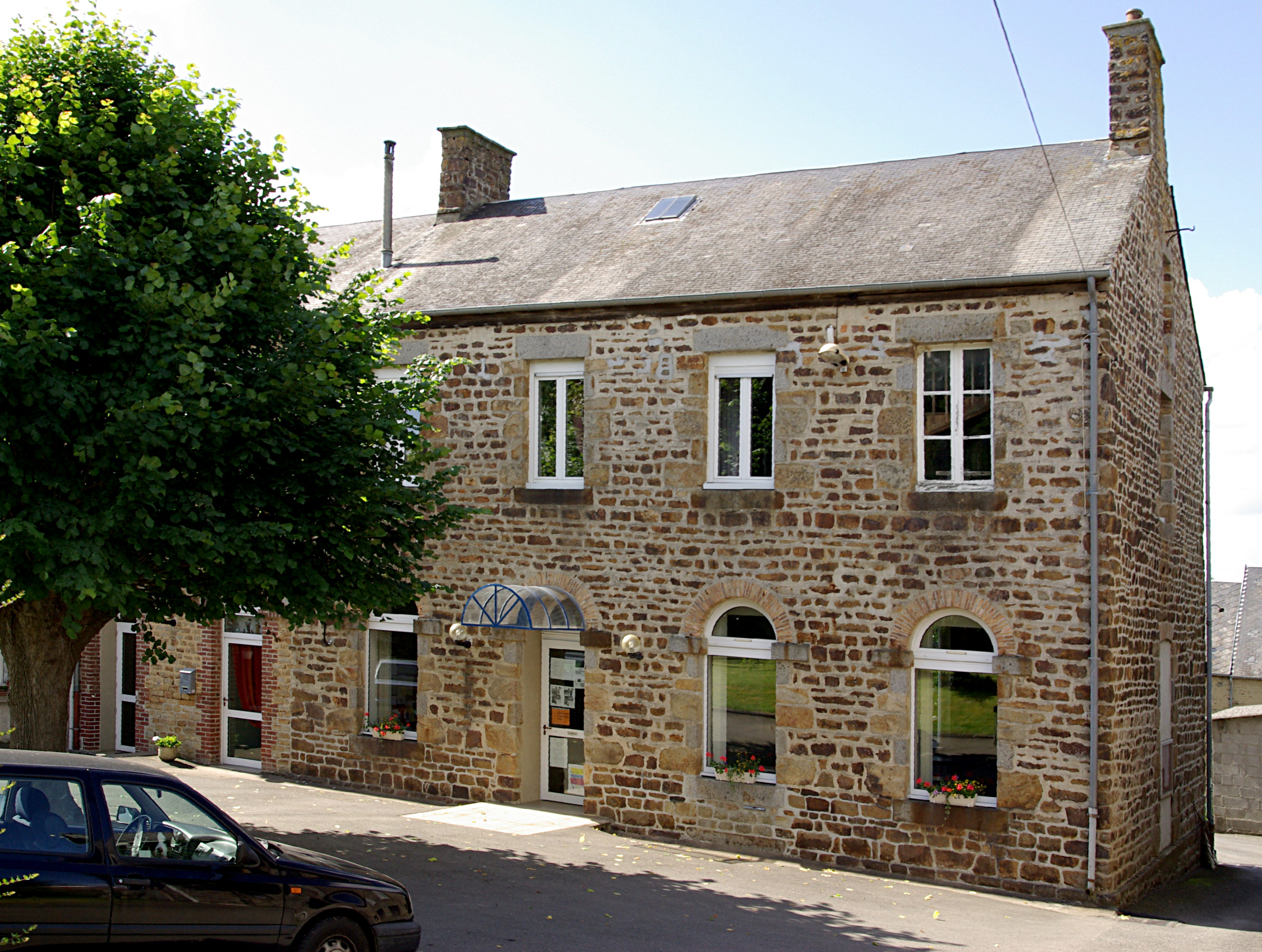
- The town hall in Saint-Pierre-d'Entremont
- Location of Saint-Pierre-d'Entremont
- Location within France Location within Normandy
- Coordinates: 48°48′38″N 0°38′52″W
- Country: France
- Region: Normandy
- Department: Orne
- Arrondissement: Argentan
- Canton: Flers-1

Government
  - Mayor (2020–2026): Christian Duriez
- Area^{1}: 6.19 km^{2} (2.39 sq mi)
- Elevation: 146 m (479 ft)
- Highest elevation: 216 m (709 ft)
- Lowest elevation: 106 m (348 ft)
- Population (2023): 658
  - Density: 106/km^{2} (275/sq mi)
- Time zone: UTC+01:00 (CET)
  - Summer (DST): UTC+02:00 (CEST)
- INSEE/Postal code: 61445 /61800
- ^{1} French Land Register data, which excludes lakes, ponds, glaciers > 1 km^{2} (0.386 sq mi or 247 acres) and river estuaries.

Saint-Pierre-d'Entremont (French pronunciation: [sɛ̃ pjɛʁ dɑ̃tʁəmɔ̃]) is a commune in the Orne department in north-western France.

== Geography ==
The commune is made up of the following collection of villages and hamlets, La Londe, Couhan, Le Haut Bocq, Le Bas Bocq, Saint-Pierre-d'Entremont, Launée, Entremont and Noirée.

The river Noireau flows through the commune.

The commune is on the border of the area known as Suisse Normande.

== Points of Interest ==
=== Museums ===
- Kiplay textile factory and museum - is a museum about the family run company, specialising in Jeans and work wear, which has been operating in the commune since 1921. The museum was opened in 2021 and includes factory tours.
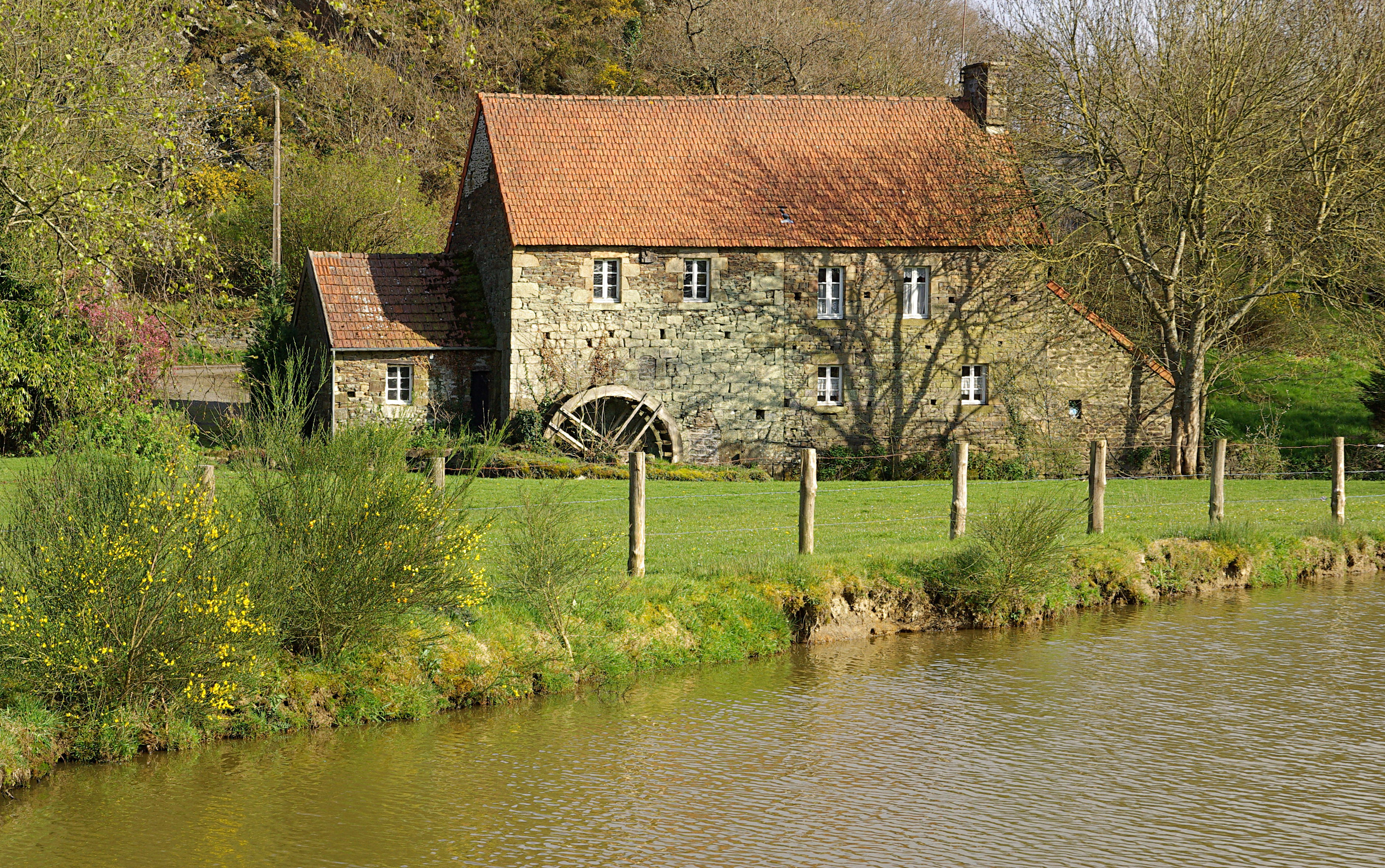
A water mill on the Noireau river at the hamlet called "Les Rochettes"

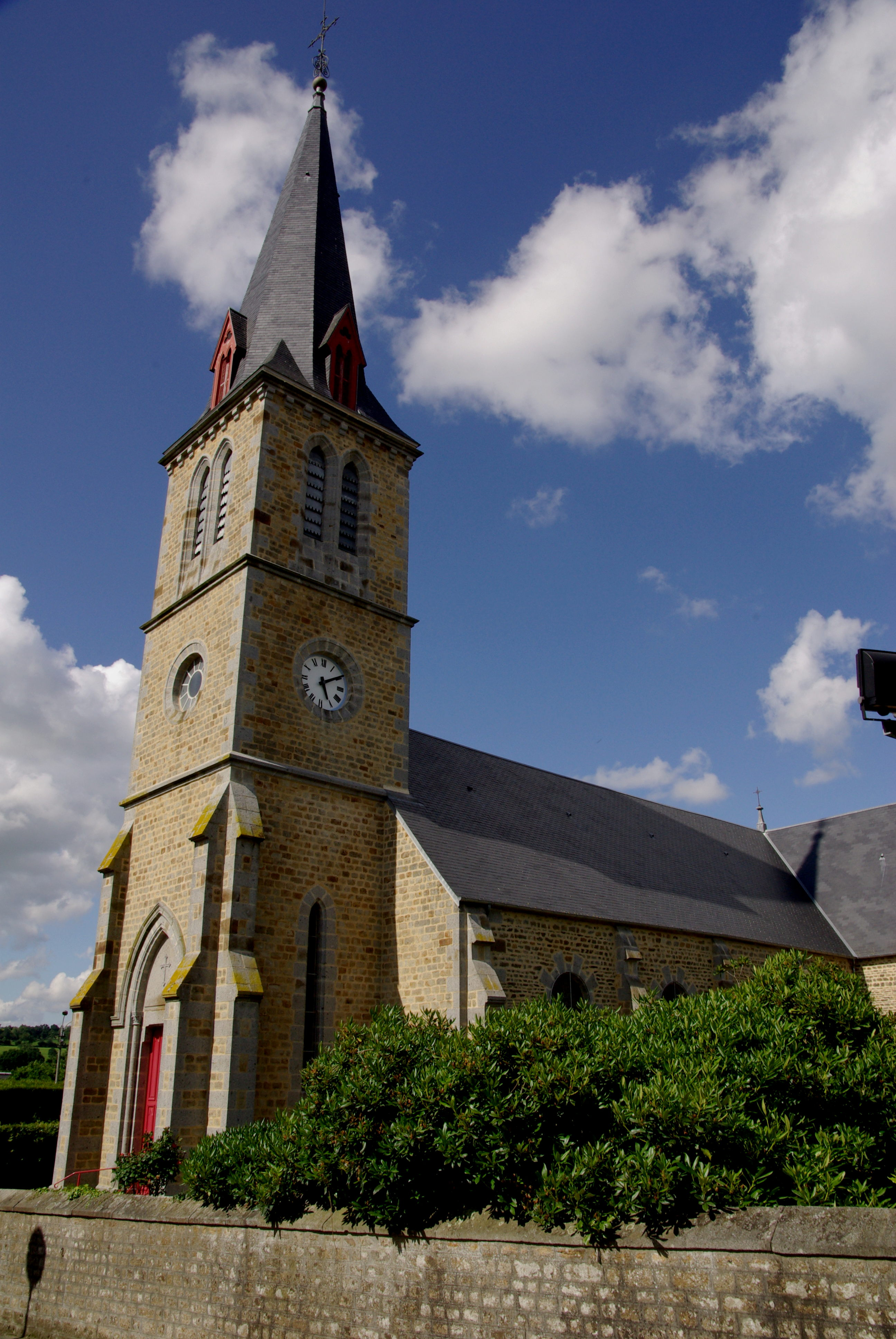
The church of Saint Pierre d'Entremont

== See also ==
- Communes of the Orne department
