= Saint-Clair-de-Halouze =

- Commune
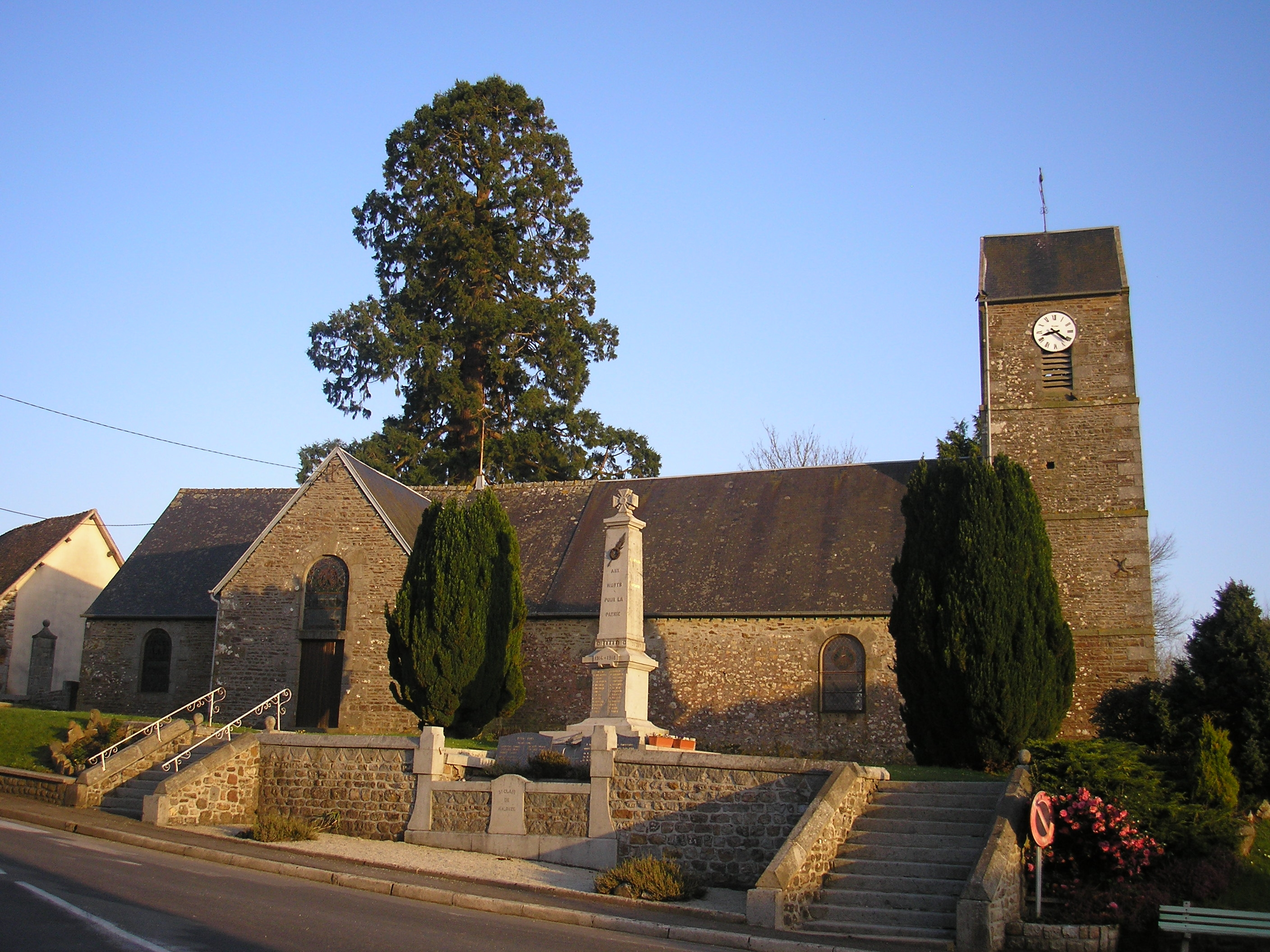
- The church in Saint-Clair-de-Halouze
- Location of Saint-Clair-de-Halouze
- Location within France Location within Normandy
- Coordinates: 48°40′48″N 0°37′26″W
- Country: France
- Region: Normandy
- Department: Orne
- Arrondissement: Argentan
- Canton: Flers-1
- Intercommunality: CA Flers Agglo

Government
  - Mayor (2020–2026): Jean-Luc Champin
- Area^{1}: 11.81 km^{2} (4.56 sq mi)
- Elevation: 223 m (732 ft)
- Highest elevation: 306 m (1,004 ft)
- Lowest elevation: 187 m (614 ft)
- Population (2023): 812
  - Density: 68.8/km^{2} (178/sq mi)
- Time zone: UTC+01:00 (CET)
  - Summer (DST): UTC+02:00 (CEST)
- INSEE/Postal code: 61376 /61490
- ^{1} French Land Register data, which excludes lakes, ponds, glaciers > 1 km^{2} (0.386 sq mi or 247 acres) and river estuaries.

Saint-Clair-de-Halouze (French pronunciation: [sɛ̃ klɛːʁ də aluz]) is a commune in the Orne department in north-western France. It is situated midway between Domfront and Flers. It was originally a centre for ferrous mining and the little community, the minehead and the railway line, now a path, remain. The small river Halouze flows through the village on its way to join the Varenne (Loire basin).

== Geography ==
The commune is made up of the following collection of villages and hamlets, Le Rocher, Lépinardière, La Bocagerie, La Haloudière, Saint-Clair-de-Halouze and La Bunêches.

== Places of Interest ==
- Old Iron Mine - it was still in operation up to 1978 and now you can still see the headframe standing above the mine shaft The former mine is part of two circuits highlighting mining in the area, "Circuit des forges et des mines” if travelling by car or the 8 km walking path of "Le circuit de la mine".
- Les fours de la Bocagerie - remains of the old kilns used for calcination of the iron ore that was produced by the nearby mines. The Kilns were operational until 1978 when the mining stopped in the area.
- la tour du Parc Celtique is an abandoned two-story tower that was built in 1973 on a rocky outcrop by the then mayor. In addition to the tower a Dolmen was built on the site.

== Notable people ==
- Ernest Maunoury -(1894 - 1921) a French flying ace during World War I, was born and buried here.

== See also ==
- Communes of the Orne department
