= Moncy =

- Commune
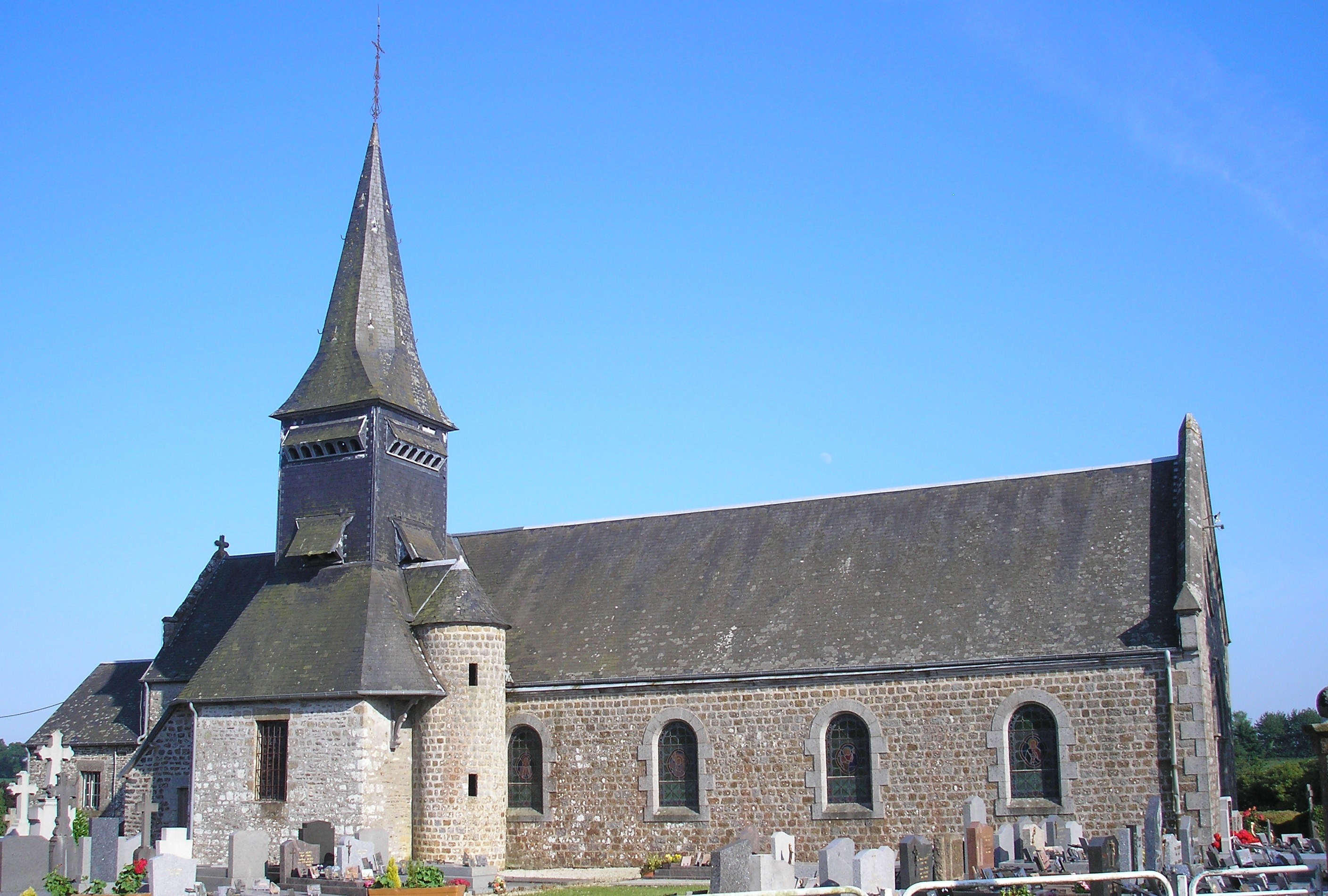
- The church in Moncy
- Location of Moncy
- Location within France Location within Normandy
- Coordinates: 48°49′32″N 0°41′06″W
- Country: France
- Region: Normandy
- Department: Orne
- Arrondissement: Argentan
- Canton: Flers-1
- Intercommunality: Domfront Tinchebray Interco

Government
  - Mayor (2020–2026): Bruno Devère
- Area^{1}: 7.75 km^{2} (2.99 sq mi)
- Highest elevation: 212 m (696 ft)
- Lowest elevation: 133 m (436 ft)
- Population (2023): 261
  - Density: 33.7/km^{2} (87.2/sq mi)
- Time zone: UTC+01:00 (CET)
  - Summer (DST): UTC+02:00 (CEST)
- INSEE/Postal code: 61281 /61800
- ^{1} French Land Register data, which excludes lakes, ponds, glaciers > 1 km^{2} (0.386 sq mi or 247 acres) and river estuaries.

Moncy (French pronunciation: [mɔ̃si]) is a commune in the Orne department in north-western France.

== Geography ==
The commune is made up of the following collection of villages and hamlets, La Moissonnière, La Huberdière, Colmesnil, Le Bois de Moncy, La Halboudière, La Vionière, La Becanière and Moncy.

The commune is on the border of the area known as Suisse Normande.

== See also ==
- Communes of the Orne department
