= Communauté d'agglomération Flers Agglo =

Flers Agglo
- Communauté d'agglomération
- Interactive map of Flers Agglo
- Coordinates: 48°43′N 00°28′W
- Country: France
- Region: Normandy
- Department: Orne
- No. of communes: {{{nbcomm}}}
- Established: 2013
- Area: 567.7 km^{2} (219.2 sq mi)
- Population (2019): 53,555
  - Density: 94.34/km^{2} (244.3/sq mi)
- Website: www.flers-agglo.fr

Communauté d'agglomération Flers Agglo is the communauté d'agglomération, an intercommunal structure, centred on the town of Flers. It is located in the Orne department, in the Normandy region, northwestern France. Created in 2013, its seat is in Flers. Its area is 567.7 km^{2}. Its population was 53,555 in 2019, of which 14,762 in Flers proper. It covers some of the Communes that make up the area known as Suisse Normande.

== Composition ==
The communauté d'agglomération consists of the following 42 communes:

1. Athis-Val de Rouvre
2. Aubusson
3. Banvou
4. La Bazoque
5. Bellou-en-Houlme
6. Berjou
7. Briouze
8. Cahan
9. Caligny
10. Cerisy-Belle-Étoile
11. La Chapelle-au-Moine
12. La Chapelle-Biche
13. Le Châtellier
14. La Coulonche
15. Dompierre
16. Durcet
17. Échalou
18. La Ferrière-aux-Étangs
19. La Ferté Macé
20. Flers
21. Le Grais
22. La Lande-Patry
23. La Lande-Saint-Siméon
24. Landigou
25. Landisacq
26. Lonlay-le-Tesson
27. Le Ménil-de-Briouze
28. Ménil-Hubert-sur-Orne
29. Messei
30. Montilly-sur-Noireau
31. Les Monts d'Andaine
32. Pointel
33. Saint-André-de-Messei
34. Saint-Clair-de-Halouze
35. Sainte-Honorine-la-Chardonne
36. Sainte-Opportune
37. Saint-Georges-des-Groseillers
38. Saint-Paul
39. Saint-Philbert-sur-Orne
40. Saint-Pierre-du-Regard
41. Saires-la-Verrerie
42. La Selle-la-Forge
