= La Chapelle-au-Moine =

- Commune
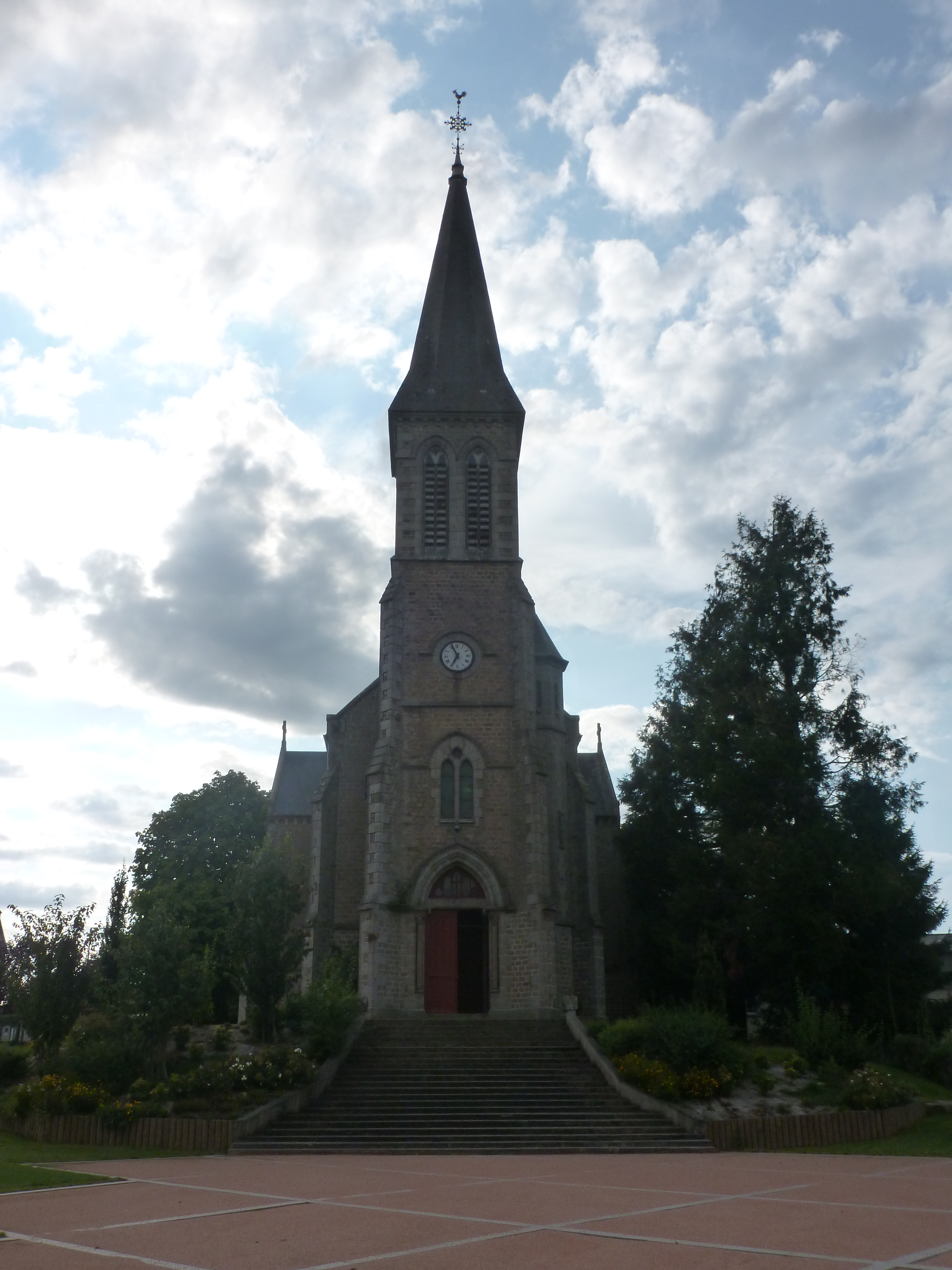
- The church in La Chapelle-au-Moine
- Location of La Chapelle-au-Moine
- Location within France Location within Normandy
- Coordinates: 48°42′32″N 0°34′59″W
- Country: France
- Region: Normandy
- Department: Orne
- Arrondissement: Argentan
- Canton: Flers-1
- Intercommunality: CA Flers Agglo

Government
  - Mayor (2020–2026): Agnès Morice
- Area^{1}: 5.32 km^{2} (2.05 sq mi)
- Elevation: 240 m (790 ft)
- Highest elevation: 306 m (1,004 ft)
- Lowest elevation: 214 m (702 ft)
- Population (2023): 586
  - Density: 110/km^{2} (285/sq mi)
- Time zone: UTC+01:00 (CET)
  - Summer (DST): UTC+02:00 (CEST)
- INSEE/Postal code: 61094 /61100
- ^{1} French Land Register data, which excludes lakes, ponds, glaciers > 1 km^{2} (0.386 sq mi or 247 acres) and river estuaries.

La Chapelle-au-Moine (French pronunciation: [la ʃapɛl o mwan]) is a commune in the Orne department in north-western France.

== Geography ==
The commune is made up of the following collection of villages and hamlets, Les Petites Noës, La Hélisière, L'Embûche, La Haute Embûche and La Chapelle-au-Moine.

It is 530 hectares (2.0 sq mi) in size. The highest point in the commune is 250 metres (820 ft).

== See also ==
- Communes of the Orne department
