= Le Grais =

- Commune
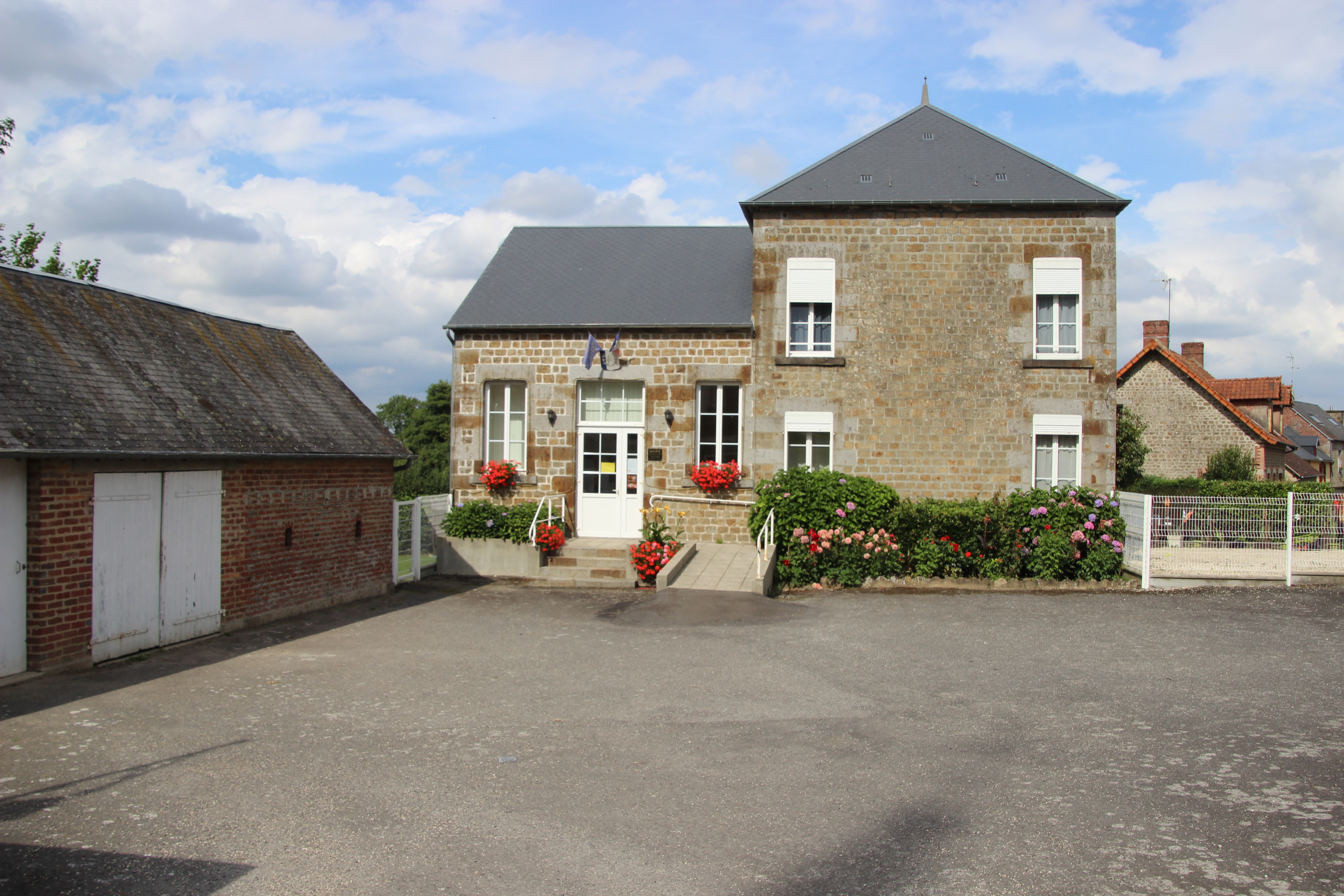
- The town hall in Le Grais
- Location of Le Grais
- Location within France Location within Normandy
- Coordinates: 48°38′23″N 0°19′40″W
- Country: France
- Region: Normandy
- Department: Orne
- Arrondissement: Argentan
- Canton: Athis-Val de Rouvre
- Intercommunality: CA Flers Agglo

Government
  - Mayor (2020–2026): Bruno Auvray
- Area^{1}: 12.21 km^{2} (4.71 sq mi)
- Elevation: 225 m (738 ft)
- Highest elevation: 297 m (974 ft)
- Lowest elevation: 209 m (686 ft)
- Population (2023): 208
  - Density: 17.0/km^{2} (44.1/sq mi)
- Time zone: UTC+01:00 (CET)
  - Summer (DST): UTC+02:00 (CEST)
- INSEE/Postal code: 61195 /61600
- ^{1} French Land Register data, which excludes lakes, ponds, glaciers > 1 km^{2} (0.386 sq mi or 247 acres) and river estuaries.

Le Grais (French pronunciation: [lə ɡʁɛ]) is a commune in the Orne department in north-western France.

== Geography ==
The commune is made up of the following collection of villages and hamlets, Le Val Benoît,Le Château and Le Grais.

It is 1,220 hectares (4.7 sq mi) in size. The highest point in the commune is 239 metres (784 ft).

There are a total of five watercourses that traverse through the commune, two rivers The Rouvre and The Rouvrette. The other water courses are all streams, The Beaudouit, La Petitiere and The Moulinet.

== Notable buildings and places ==
=== National heritage sites ===
- Logis de la Petitière a 15th Century Manor house, built by the English during the Hundred Years' War, it was registered as a Monument historique in 1975.

== See also ==
- Communes of the Orne department
