= Claude Lechatellier =

French cyclist

Personal information
- Born: 17 December 1946 (age 79) Caligny, France

Cycling career
- Sport: Cycling
- Current team: Retired
- Discipline: Road
- Role: Rider

Amateur teams
- 1963-1965: CA Flers
- 1966-1968: CC Flers
- 1966-1968: ASPTT Tours
- 1969-1970: CC Flers
- 1975: VC Saint-Hilaire

Professional team
- 1974: Magiglace–Juaneda

Claude Lechatellier (born 17 December 1946) is a French former cyclist. He competed in the team time trial at the 1968 Summer Olympics.

== Major results ==
1969
1st Stage 1 Route de France
1970
1st Overall Circuit de la Sarthe
5th Overall Tour de l'Avenir
1971
5th Overall Giro Ciclistico d'Italia
