= Pointel =

- Commune
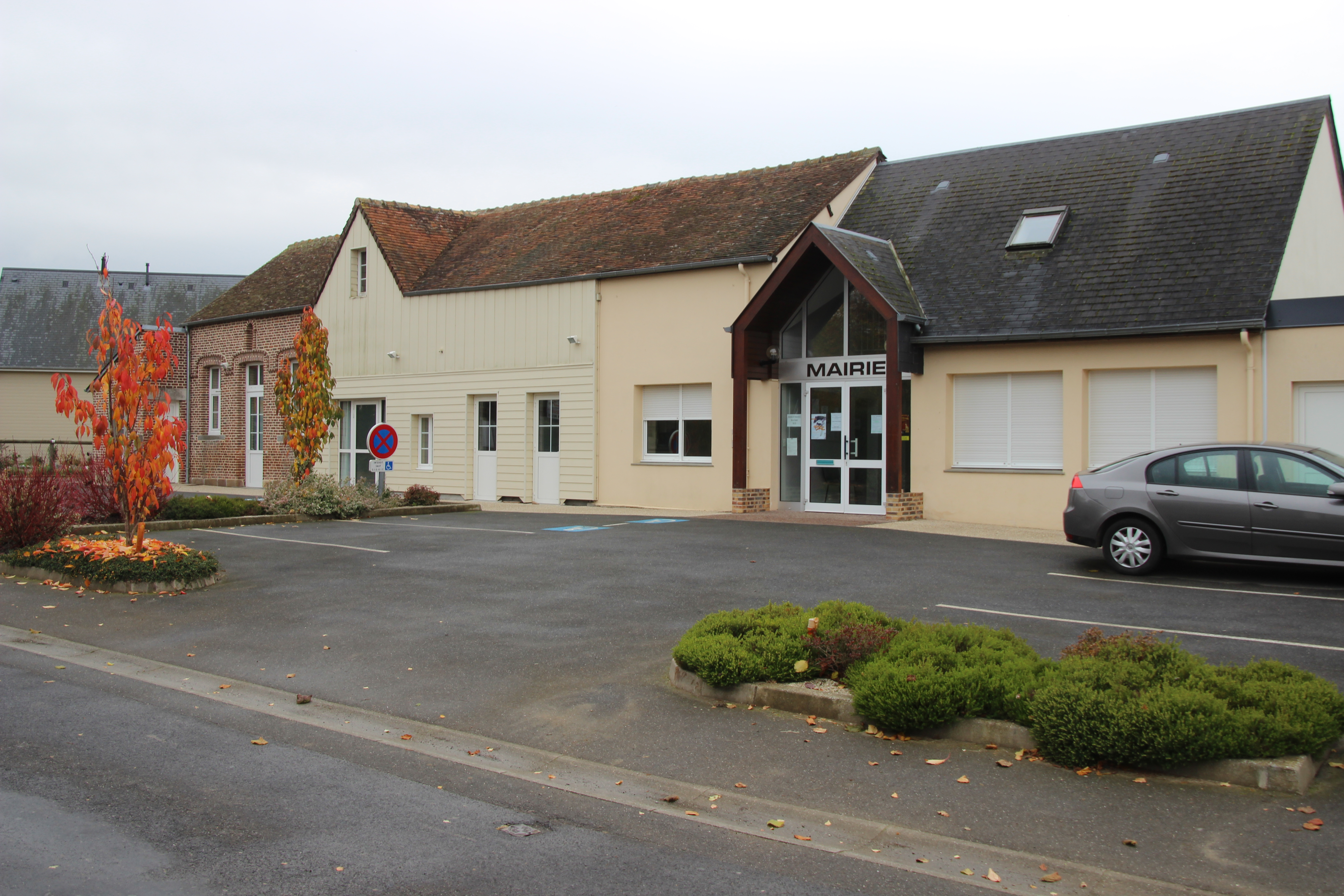
- The town hall in Pointel
- Location of Pointel
- Location within France Location within Normandy
- Coordinates: 48°42′02″N 0°20′54″W
- Country: France
- Region: Normandy
- Department: Orne
- Arrondissement: Argentan
- Canton: Athis-Val de Rouvre
- Intercommunality: CA Flers Agglo

Government
  - Mayor (2020–2026): Jean-Luc Leportier
- Area^{1}: 7.52 km^{2} (2.90 sq mi)
- Elevation: 230 m (750 ft)
- Highest elevation: 242 m (794 ft)
- Lowest elevation: 200 m (660 ft)
- Population (2023): 301
  - Density: 40.0/km^{2} (104/sq mi)
- Time zone: UTC+01:00 (CET)
  - Summer (DST): UTC+02:00 (CEST)
- INSEE/Postal code: 61332 /61220
- ^{1} French Land Register data, which excludes lakes, ponds, glaciers > 1 km^{2} (0.386 sq mi or 247 acres) and river estuaries.

Pointel (French pronunciation: [pwɛ̃tɛl]) is a commune in the Orne department in north-western France.

== Geography ==
The commune is made up of the following collection of villages and hamlets, Le Bois de Pointel, Le Chênay, Pointel, L'Anglêcherie, Le Bois Jean and La Bourdonnière.

It is 750 hectares (2.9 sq mi) in size. The highest point in the commune is 210 metres (690 ft).

The commune has seven watercourses running through it, the rivers Rouvre and the Val du Breuil, plus a stream the Arthan.

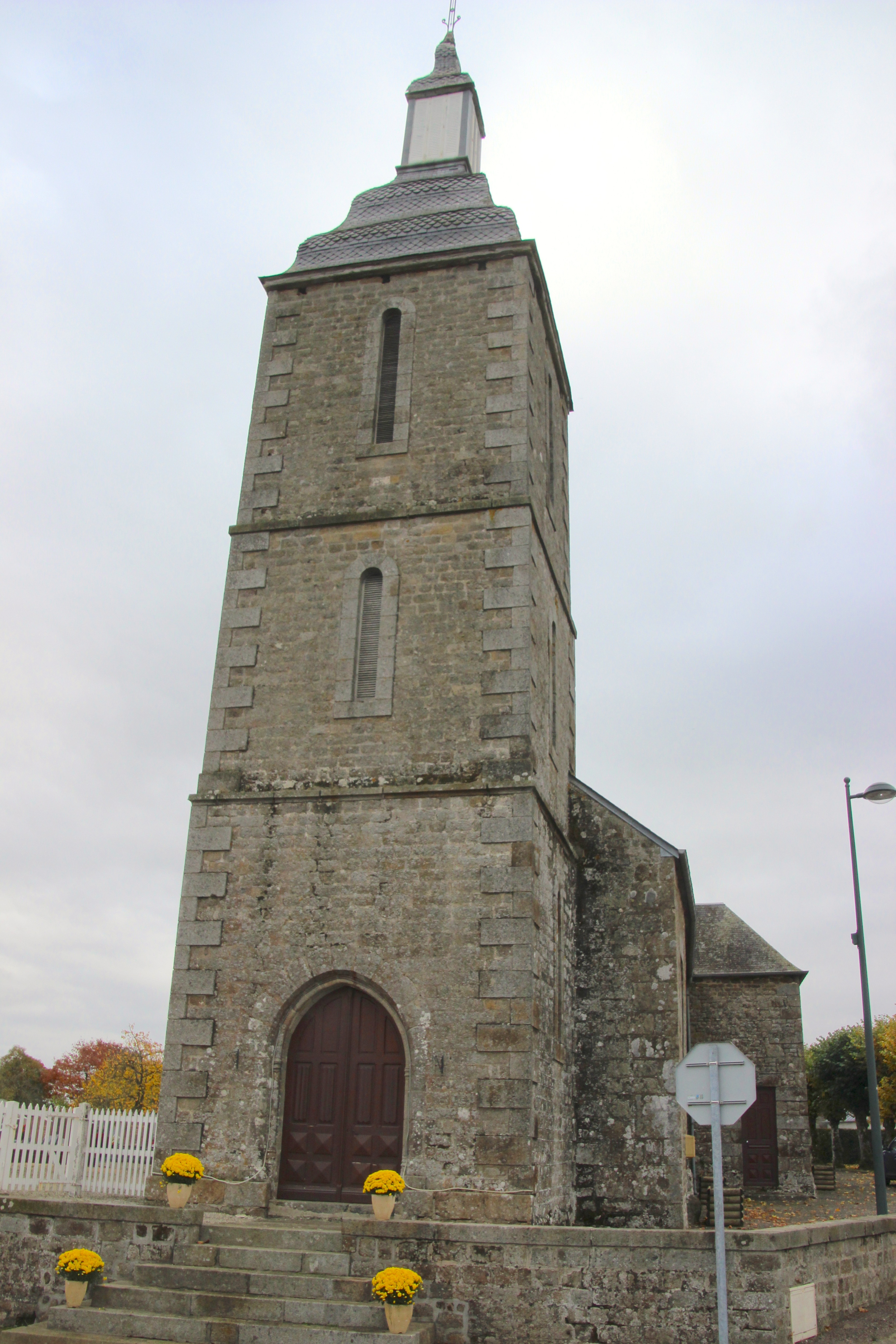
Pointel Church

== See also ==
- Communes of the Orne department
