= Landisacq =

- Commune
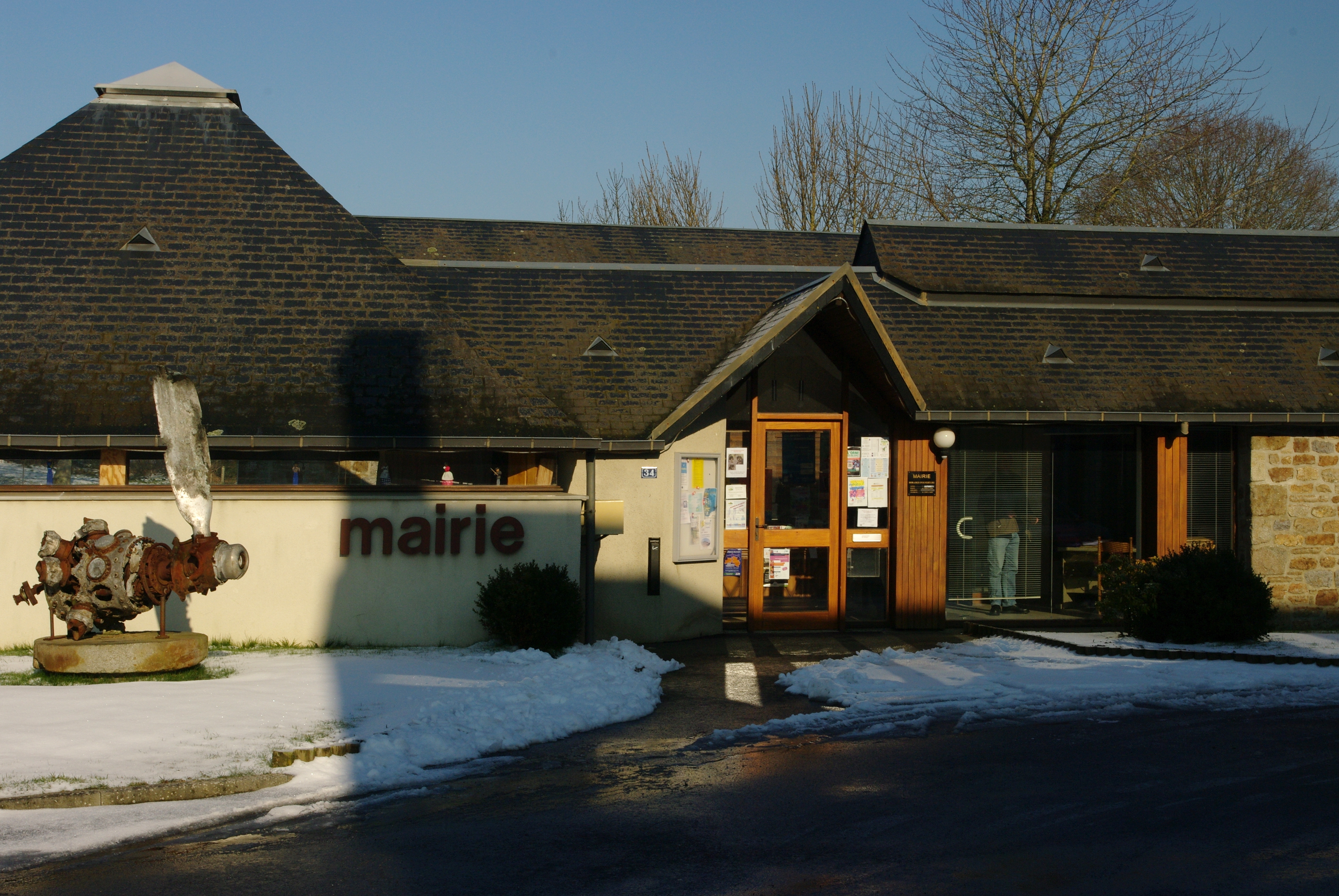
- The town hall in Landisacq
- Location of Landisacq
- Location within France Location within Normandy
- Coordinates: 48°45′27″N 0°38′46″W
- Country: France
- Region: Normandy
- Department: Orne
- Arrondissement: Argentan
- Canton: Flers-1
- Intercommunality: CA Flers Agglo

Government
  - Mayor (2020–2026): Béatrice Guyot
- Area^{1}: 10.91 km^{2} (4.21 sq mi)
- Elevation: 253 m (830 ft)
- Highest elevation: 309 m (1,014 ft)
- Lowest elevation: 188 m (617 ft)
- Population (2023): 765
  - Density: 70.1/km^{2} (182/sq mi)
- Demonym: Landisacquois
- Time zone: UTC+01:00 (CET)
  - Summer (DST): UTC+02:00 (CEST)
- INSEE/Postal code: 61222 /61100
- ^{1} French Land Register data, which excludes lakes, ponds, glaciers > 1 km^{2} (0.386 sq mi or 247 acres) and river estuaries.

Landisacq (French pronunciation: [lɑ̃dizak]) is a commune in the Orne department in north-western France.

== Geography ==
The commune is made up of the following collection of villages and hamlets, Le Val, Le Haut Bisson, La Marière, La Flaudière, Landisacq, La Métairie, La Besnerie and La Haute Hagrie.

The commune is on the border of the area known as Suisse Normande.

A river, La Visance, flows through the commune. In addition three streams also traverse the commune Ruisseau du Plessis, Ruisseau de la Flaudiere and the Ruisseau des Viviers.

== Gallery ==
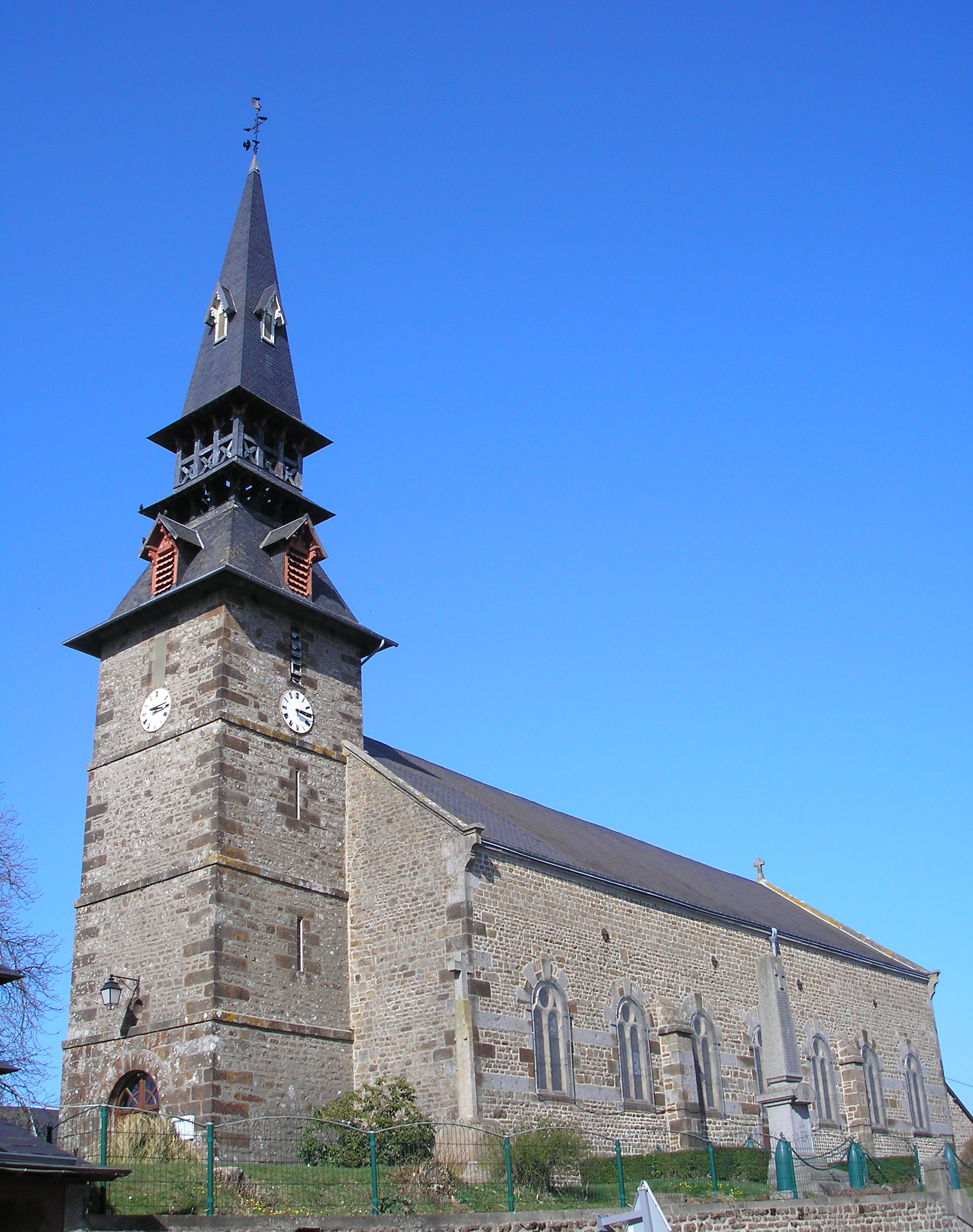
Saint-Étienne Church.

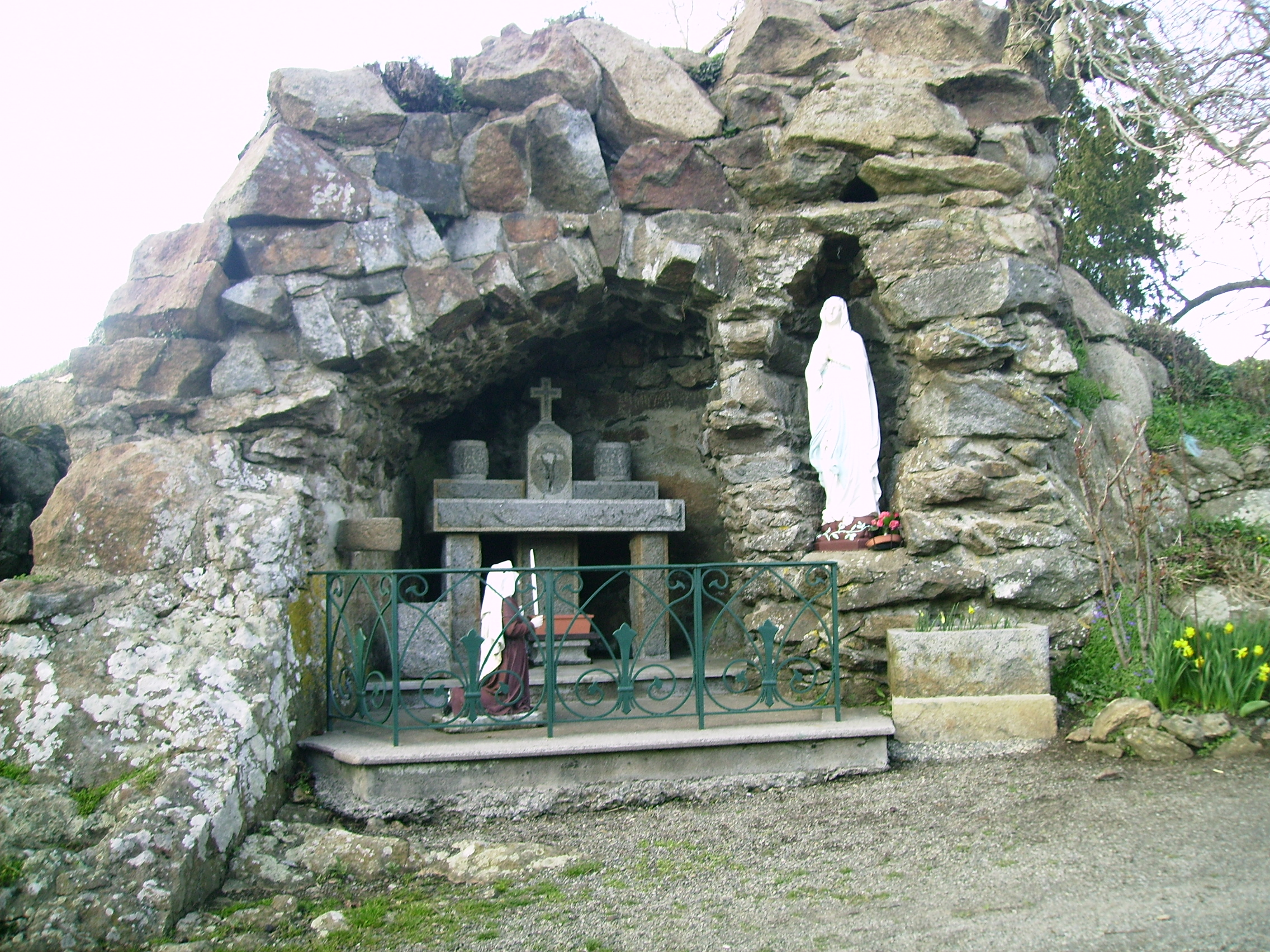
replica of the Grotte Notre-Dame de Lourdes.

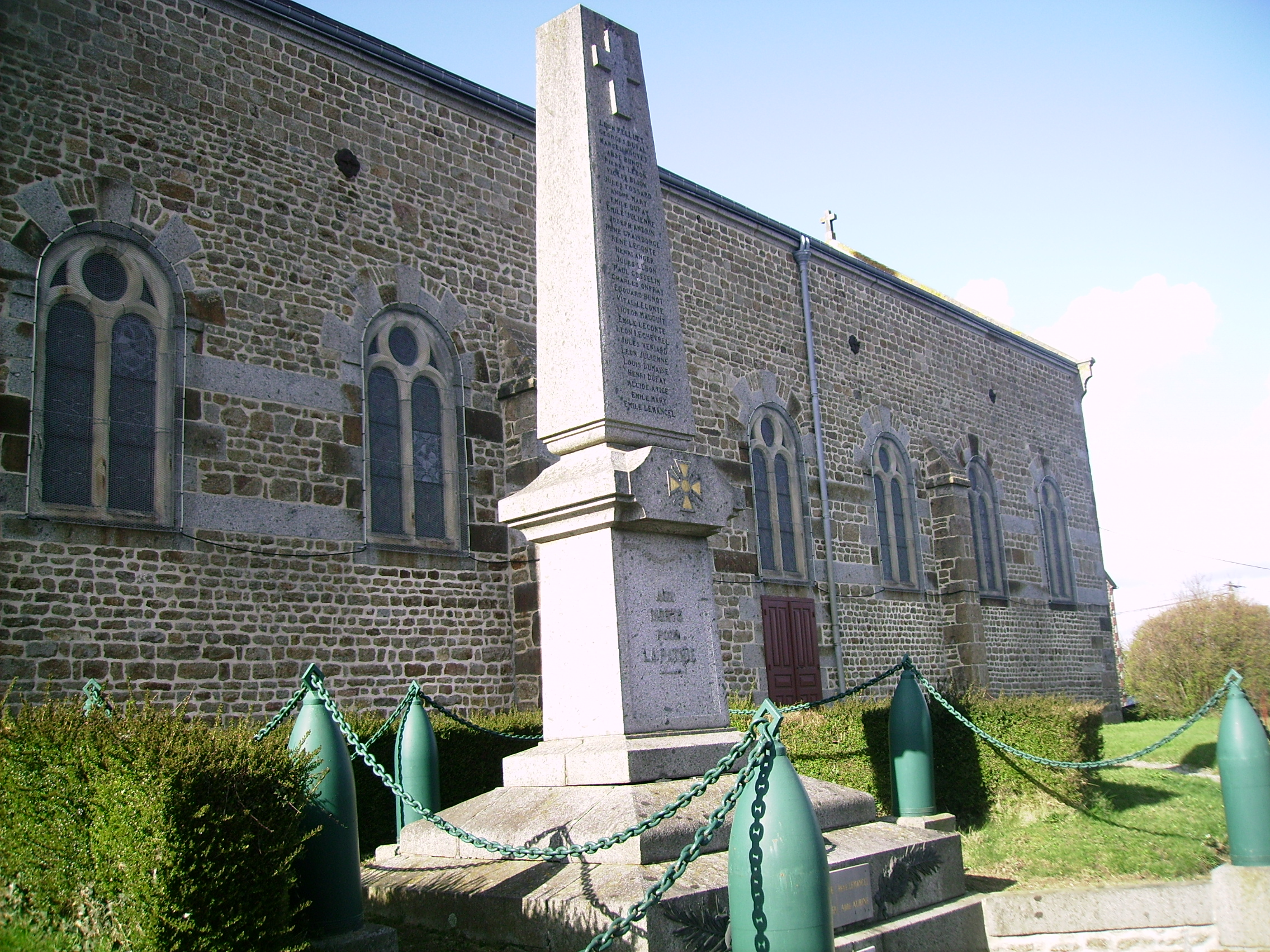
Le monument of war dead.

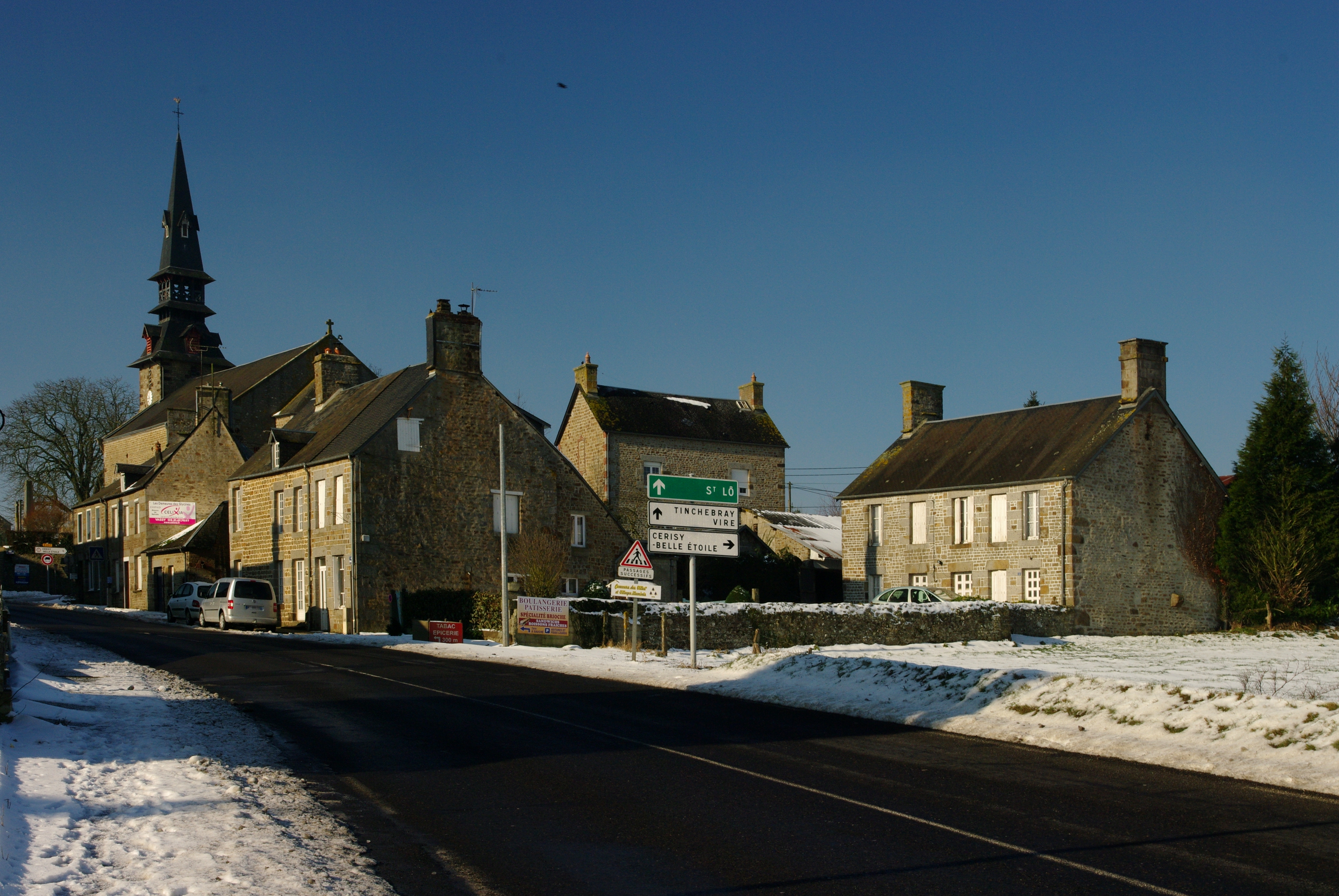
the village

== See also ==
- Communes of the Orne department
