= Le Châtellier, Orne =

Le Châtellier
- Commune
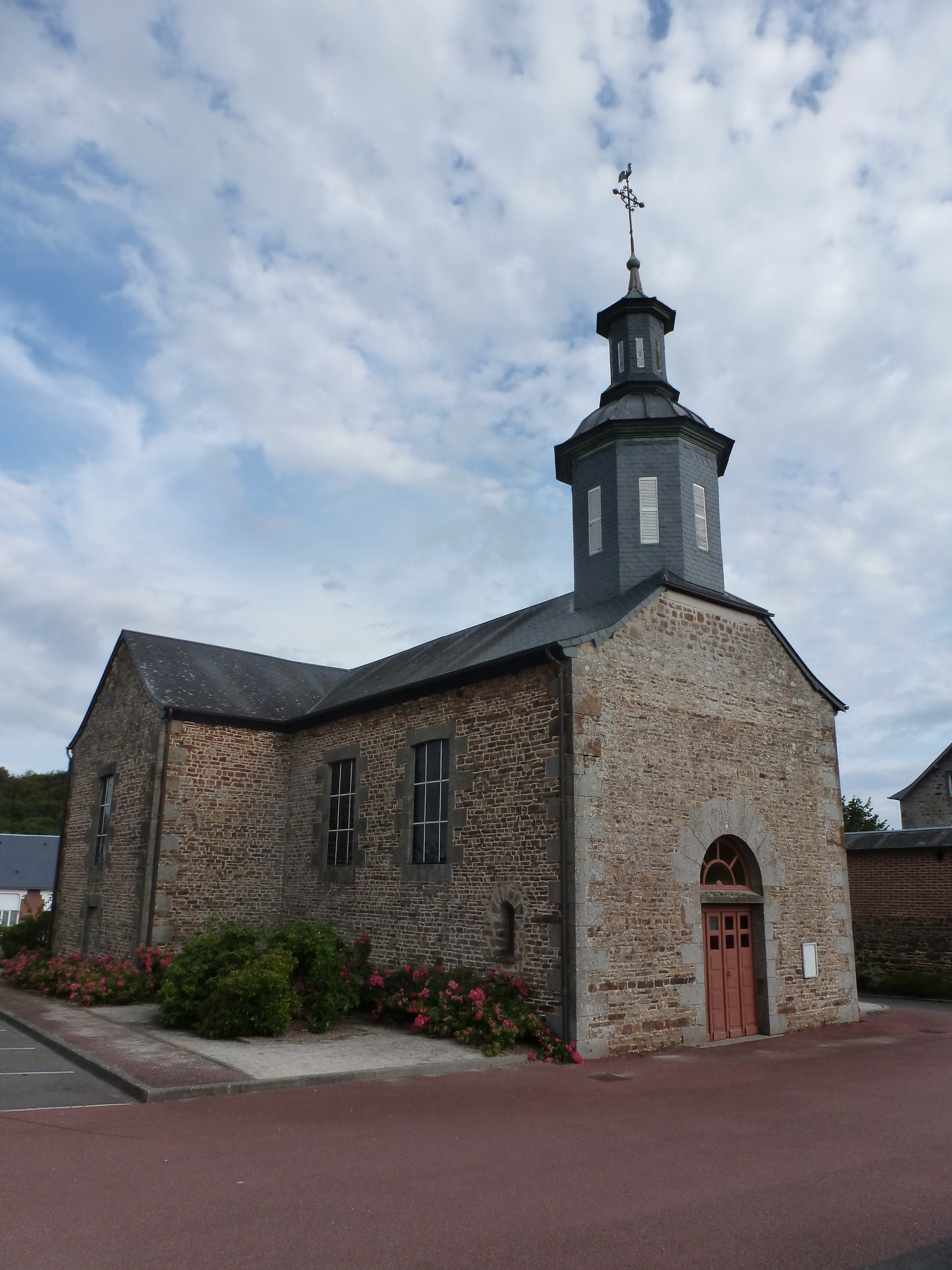
- The church in Le Châtellier
- Location of Le Châtellier
- Location within France Location within Normandy
- Coordinates: 48°40′36″N 0°34′49″W
- Country: France
- Region: Normandy
- Department: Orne
- Arrondissement: Argentan
- Canton: Flers-1
- Intercommunality: CA Flers Agglo

Government
  - Mayor (2020–2026): Didier Langlin
- Area^{1}: 8.18 km^{2} (3.16 sq mi)
- Elevation: 187 m (614 ft)
- Highest elevation: 275 m (902 ft)
- Lowest elevation: 175 m (574 ft)
- Population (2023): 401
  - Density: 49.0/km^{2} (127/sq mi)
- Time zone: UTC+01:00 (CET)
  - Summer (DST): UTC+02:00 (CEST)
- INSEE/Postal code: 61102 /61450
- ^{1} French Land Register data, which excludes lakes, ponds, glaciers > 1 km^{2} (0.386 sq mi or 247 acres) and river estuaries.

Le Châtellier (French pronunciation: [lə ʃatəlje]) is a commune in the Orne department in north-western France.

== Geography ==
The commune is made up of the following collection of villages and hamlets, Le Hamel, Les Fermés and Le Châtellier.

It is 820 hectares (3.2 sq mi) in size. The highest point in the commune is 192 metres (630 ft).

The Halouze and the Varenne are the two rivers, running through this commune.

== See also ==
- Communes of the Orne department
