= La Chapelle-Biche =

- Commune
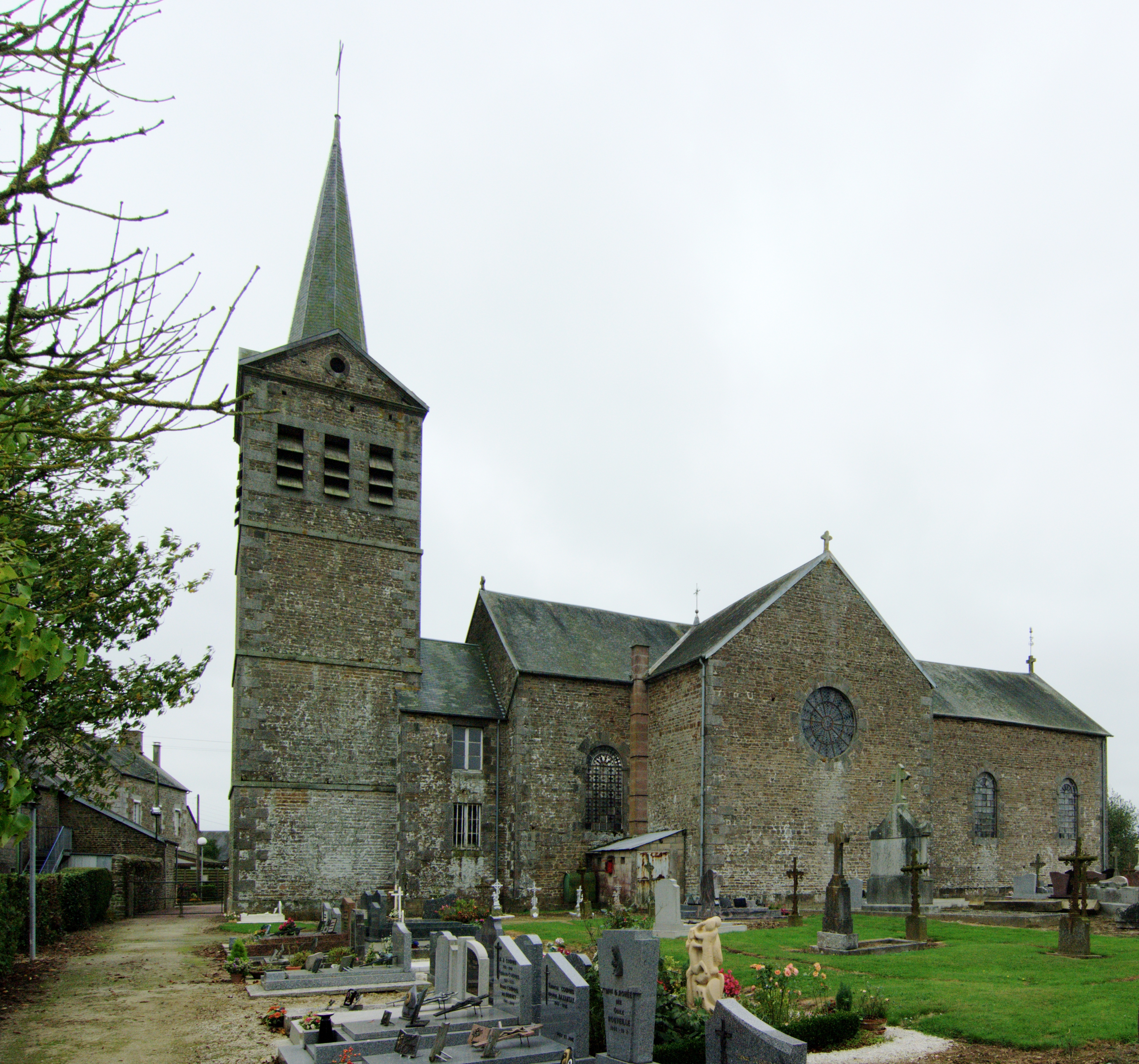
- The church in La Chapelle-Biche
- Location of La Chapelle-Biche
- Location within France Location within Normandy
- Coordinates: 48°42′43″N 0°37′41″W
- Country: France
- Region: Normandy
- Department: Orne
- Arrondissement: Argentan
- Canton: Flers-1
- Intercommunality: CA Flers Agglo

Government
  - Mayor (2020–2026): Jean-Claude Dorsy
- Area^{1}: 6.25 km^{2} (2.41 sq mi)
- Elevation: 300 m (980 ft)
- Highest elevation: 307 m (1,007 ft)
- Lowest elevation: 204 m (669 ft)
- Population (2023): 525
  - Density: 84.0/km^{2} (218/sq mi)
- Demonym: Bichois
- Time zone: UTC+01:00 (CET)
  - Summer (DST): UTC+02:00 (CEST)
- INSEE/Postal code: 61095 /61100
- ^{1} French Land Register data, which excludes lakes, ponds, glaciers > 1 km^{2} (0.386 sq mi or 247 acres) and river estuaries.

La Chapelle-Biche (French pronunciation: [la ʃapɛl biʃ]) is a commune in the Orne department in north-western France.

== Geography ==
The commune is made up of the following collection of villages and hamlets, La Sauvagère, Le Val Tourneur and La Chapelle-Biche.

A river, Le Hariel, flows through the commune, as well as a stream, Ruisseau du Pont a Sec.

== See also ==
- Communes of the Orne department
