= La Bazoque, Orne =

La Bazoque
- Commune
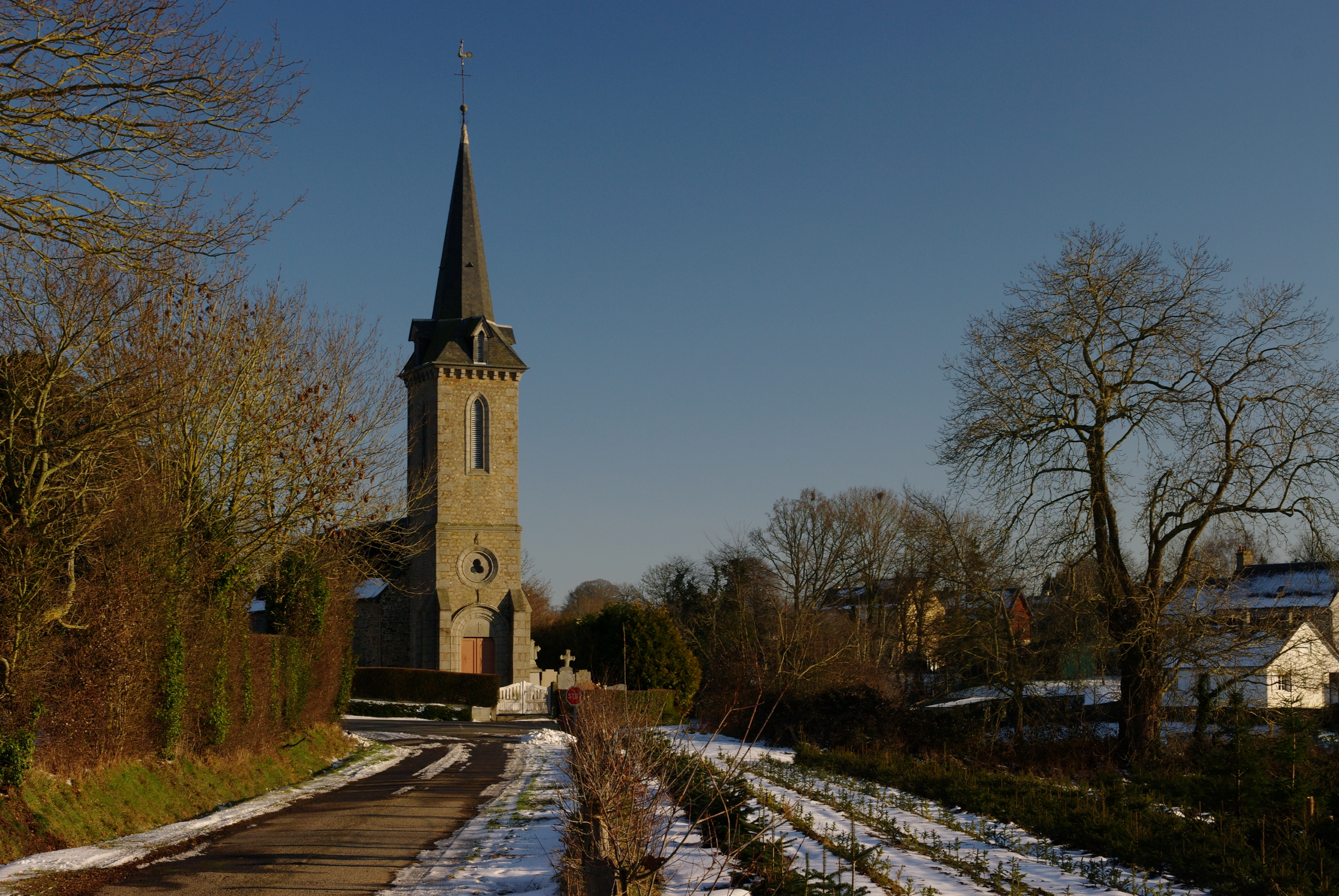
- The church in La Bazoque
- Location of La Bazoque
- Location within France Location within Normandy
- Coordinates: 48°47′39″N 0°35′51″W
- Country: France
- Region: Normandy
- Department: Orne
- Arrondissement: Argentan
- Canton: Flers-1
- Intercommunality: CA Flers Agglo

Government
  - Mayor (2020–2026): Alexandra Tertre
- Area^{1}: 2.59 km^{2} (1.00 sq mi)
- Elevation: 169 m (554 ft)
- Highest elevation: 202 m (663 ft)
- Lowest elevation: 134 m (440 ft)
- Population (2023): 269
  - Density: 104/km^{2} (269/sq mi)
- Time zone: UTC+01:00 (CET)
  - Summer (DST): UTC+02:00 (CEST)
- INSEE/Postal code: 61030 /61100
- ^{1} French Land Register data, which excludes lakes, ponds, glaciers > 1 km^{2} (0.386 sq mi or 247 acres) and river estuaries.

La Bazoque (French pronunciation: [la bazɔk]) is a commune in the Orne department in northwestern France.

== Geography ==
The commune is part of the area known as Suisse Normande.

The commune is made up of the following collection of villages and hamlets, Le Bosny,La Tortulière, La Fouillée and La Bazoque.

== Population ==
Historical population
| Year | Pop. | ±% p.a. |
|---|---|---|
| 1968 | 145 | — |
| 1975 | 152 | +0.68% |
| 1982 | 174 | +1.95% |
| 1990 | 199 | +1.69% |
| 1999 | 192 | −0.40% |
| 2007 | 239 | +2.77% |
| 2012 | 253 | +1.15% |
| 2017 | 265 | +0.93% |
| 2023 | 269 | +0.25% |
Source: INSEE

== See also ==
- Communes of the Orne department
