= Merlerault-le-Pin =

- Commune
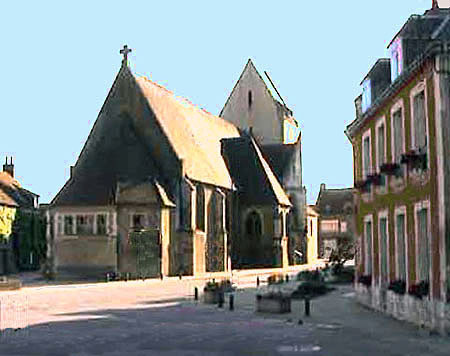
- The church in Le Merlerault
- Location of Merlerault-le-Pin
- Location within France Location within Normandy
- Coordinates: 48°42′04″N 0°17′11″E
- Country: France
- Region: Normandy
- Department: Orne
- Arrondissement: Mortagne-au-Perche
- Canton: Rai
- Intercommunality: CC Vallées d'Auge et du Merlerault

Government
  - Mayor (2025–2026): Matthias Gressant
- Area^{1}: 61.55 km^{2} (23.76 sq mi)
- Highest elevation: 321 m (1,053 ft)
- Lowest elevation: 175 m (574 ft)
- Population (2023): 1,429
  - Density: 23.22/km^{2} (60.13/sq mi)
- Time zone: UTC+01:00 (CET)
  - Summer (DST): UTC+02:00 (CEST)
- INSEE/Postal code: 61275 /61240
- ^{1} French Land Register data, which excludes lakes, ponds, glaciers > 1 km^{2} (0.386 sq mi or 247 acres) and river estuaries.

Merlerault-le-Pin (French pronunciation: [mɛʁləʁo lə pɛ̃]) is a commune in the Orne department in north-western France. It was formed on 1 January 2025, with the merger of Les Authieux-du-Puits, La Genevraie, Godisson, Le Merlerault and Nonant-le-Pin.

== Geography ==
The commune is made up of the following collection of villages and hamlets, La Butte, La Reboursière, La Chauvinière, Les Terres Noires,Les Mandrettes, Nonant-le-Pin, Le Merlerault, La Chambre, La Guerrie, Les Carrés, Les Mares, Montmarcé, La Cailletière, La Patte-d'Oie, Les Authieux-du-Puits, Carnettes, Les Foutelées, Les Houx, Le Varo, La Chevallerie, Le Tertre, Les Clos, Le Prieuré, Le Moncel, Le Cerisier, La Bêchetière, Ferme des Herbages, Le Tourniquet, Le Marais, Godisson, La Lamberderie, La Teunebeuverie, La Roussière, Le Mesnil-Hurel and La Dauphinerie.

The Commune is one of 27 communes that make up the Natura 2000 protected area of Bocages et vergers du sud Pays d'Auge.

Merlerault-le-Pin along with another 65 communes is part of a 20,593 hectare, Natura 2000 conservation area, called the Haute vallée de l'Orne et affluents.

Merlerault-le-Pin has 3 rivers that run through it, the Dieuge the Don and the Ure. The commune also has five streams flowing through its borders the Saint-Martin, la Genevraie, Bois Guimon, Brullemail and the Varo.

=== Climate ===
Merlerault-le-Pin benefits from an oceanic climate with mild winters and temperate summers.

Climate data for Le Merlerault (2007–2020 normals, extremes 2007–2024)
Month	Jan	Feb	Mar	Apr	May	Jun	Jul	Aug	Sep	Oct	Nov	Dec	Year
Record high °C (°F)	14.2 (57.6)	19.7 (67.5)	23.2 (73.8)	27.2 (81.0)	28.1 (82.6)	36.3 (97.3)	39.1 (102.4)	36.6 (97.9)	32.7 (90.9)	27.5 (81.5)	22 (72)	15.5 (59.9)	39.1 (102.4)
Mean daily maximum °C (°F)	6.8 (44.2)	7.8 (46.0)	11.1 (52.0)	15 (59)	18 (64)	21.3 (70.3)	23.8 (74.8)	23.3 (73.9)	20.5 (68.9)	15.4 (59.7)	10.7 (51.3)	7.7 (45.9)	15.1 (59.2)
Daily mean °C (°F)	4.2 (39.6)	4.7 (40.5)	7.2 (45.0)	10.2 (50.4)	13 (55)	16.3 (61.3)	18.3 (64.9)	18.1 (64.6)	15.5 (59.9)	11.8 (53.2)	7.9 (46.2)	5 (41)	11 (52)
Mean daily minimum °C (°F)	1.7 (35.1)	1.5 (34.7)	3.3 (37.9)	5.3 (41.5)	8.1 (46.6)	11.2 (52.2)	12.8 (55.0)	12.8 (55.0)	10.5 (50.9)	8.2 (46.8)	5.2 (41.4)	2.3 (36.1)	6.9 (44.4)
Record low °C (°F)	−12.1 (10.2)	−12.5 (9.5)	−9.2 (15.4)	−3.8 (25.2)	−1.6 (29.1)	2.7 (36.9)	5.3 (41.5)	5.4 (41.7)	1.1 (34.0)	−1.8 (28.8)	−6.5 (20.3)	−10.1 (13.8)	−12.5 (9.5)
Average precipitation mm (inches)	71.8 (2.83)	61.3 (2.41)	60.9 (2.40)	52.8 (2.08)	68.6 (2.70)	61.7 (2.43)	49.2 (1.94)	63.7 (2.51)	42.6 (1.68)	70.9 (2.79)	79 (3.1)	92.8 (3.65)	775.3 (30.52)
Average precipitation days (≥ 1.0 mm)	13.9	11.8	10.6	9.5	9.5	8.9	6.8	9.8	7.8	12.5	14.5	15.2	130.6
Source: Meteociel

== Points of interest ==
=== National heritage sites ===
- Ensemble castral remains of a medieval residence with a circular mound located in Le Merlerault, it was registered as a Monument historique in 1989.

== Notable people ==
- Foulques du Merle - (1239-1314) was Seigneur of Gacé and Bellou-en-Houlme, and Baron of Le Merlerault, Briouze and Messei.
- Charles-Paul Landon (1760-1826), a French painter and popular writer on art and artists, was born here.
- François Pouqueville - (1770–1838) a French diplomat, writer, explorer, physician and historian, and member of the Institut de France was born here.
- Marie Duplessis (1824-1847), a French courtesan and mistress to a number of prominent and wealthy men was born here. She was the inspiration for Marguerite Gautier, the main character of the 1848 novel The Lady of the Camellias.
- Léon Labbé - (1832–1916) a French surgeon and politician was born here.

== Transport ==
Le Merlerault station has rail connections to Argentan, Paris and Granville.

== Twin towns – sister cities ==
Le Merlerault is twinned with:

- Collingbourne Ducis, United Kingdom (since 1992)

== See also ==
- Communes of the Orne department
