= The Lady of the Camellias =

1848 novel by Alexandre Dumas fils

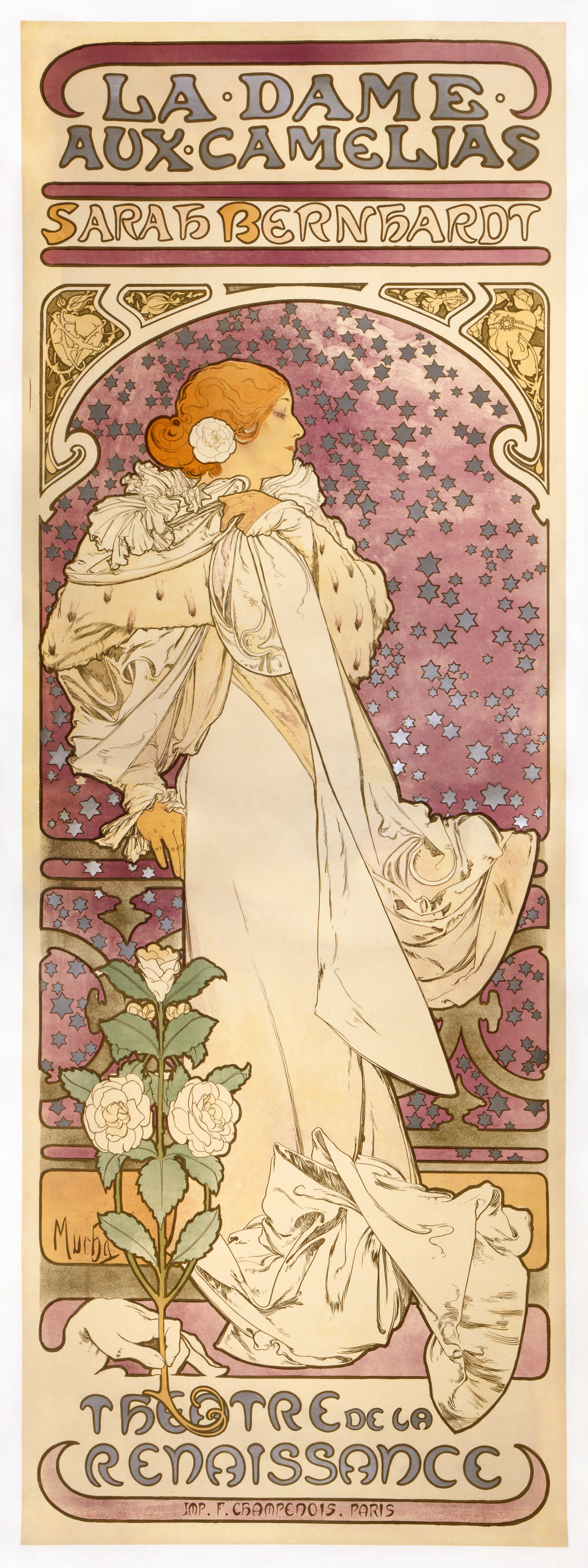
- Alphonse Mucha's poster for a performance of the theatrical version, with Sarah Bernhardt (1896)
- Original title: La Dame aux Camélias
- Original language: French
- Written by: Alexandre Dumas fils
- Genre: Tragedy

Premiere
- Date: 2 February 1852
- Place: Théâtre du Vaudeville, Paris, France

The Lady of the Camellias (French: La Dame aux Camélias) is a novel by Alexandre Dumas fils. First published in 1848 and subsequently adapted by Dumas for the stage, the play premiered at the Théâtre du Vaudeville in Paris, France, on February 2, 1852. It was an instant success. Shortly thereafter, Italian composer Giuseppe Verdi set about putting the story to music in the 1853 opera La traviata, with female protagonist Marguerite Gautier renamed Violetta Valéry.

In some of the English-speaking world, The Lady of the Camellias became known as Camille, and sixteen versions have been performed at Broadway theatres alone. The title character is Marguerite Gautier, who is based on Marie Duplessis, the real-life lover of the author.

== Summary and analysis ==
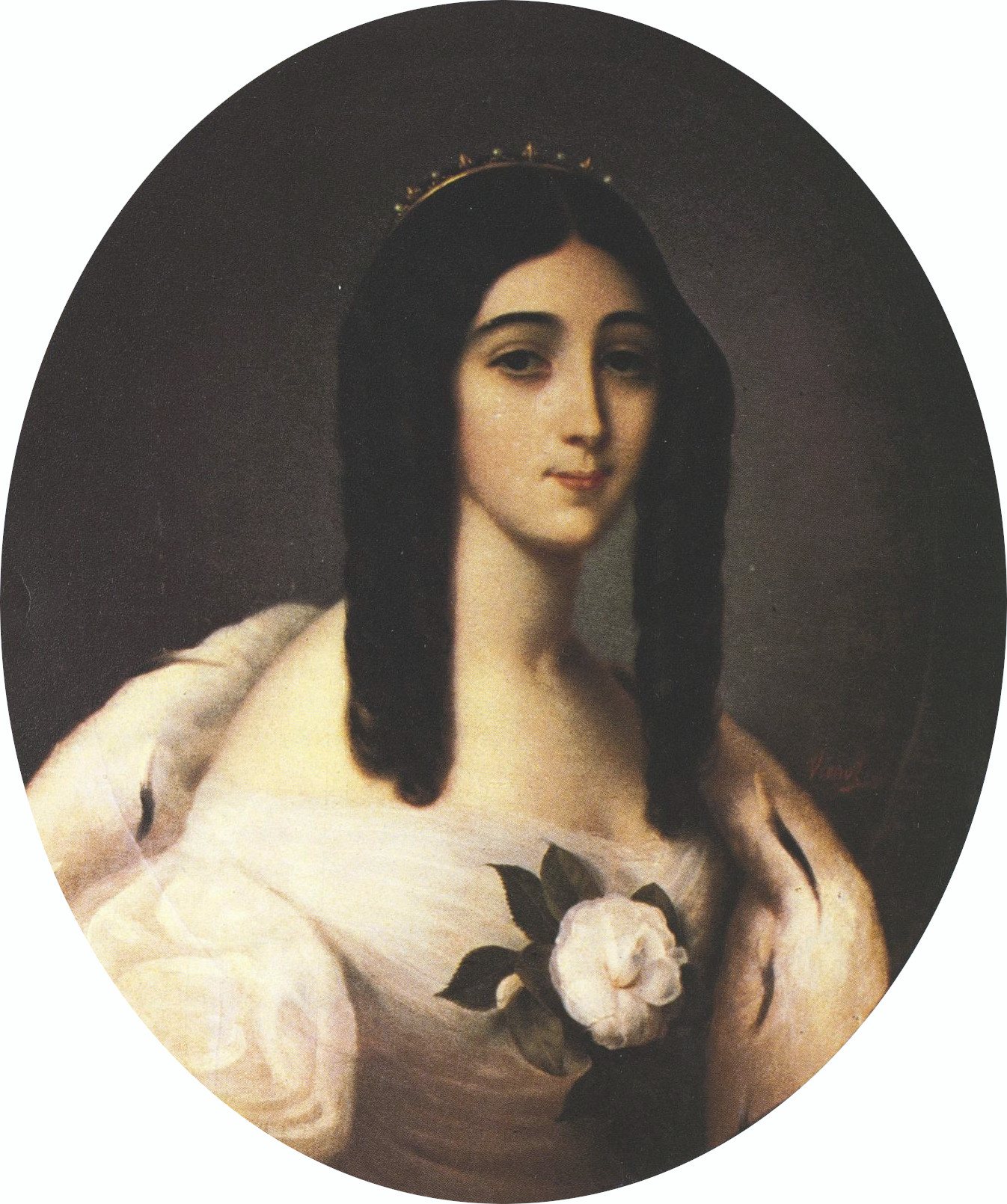
Marie Duplessis painted by Édouard Viénot

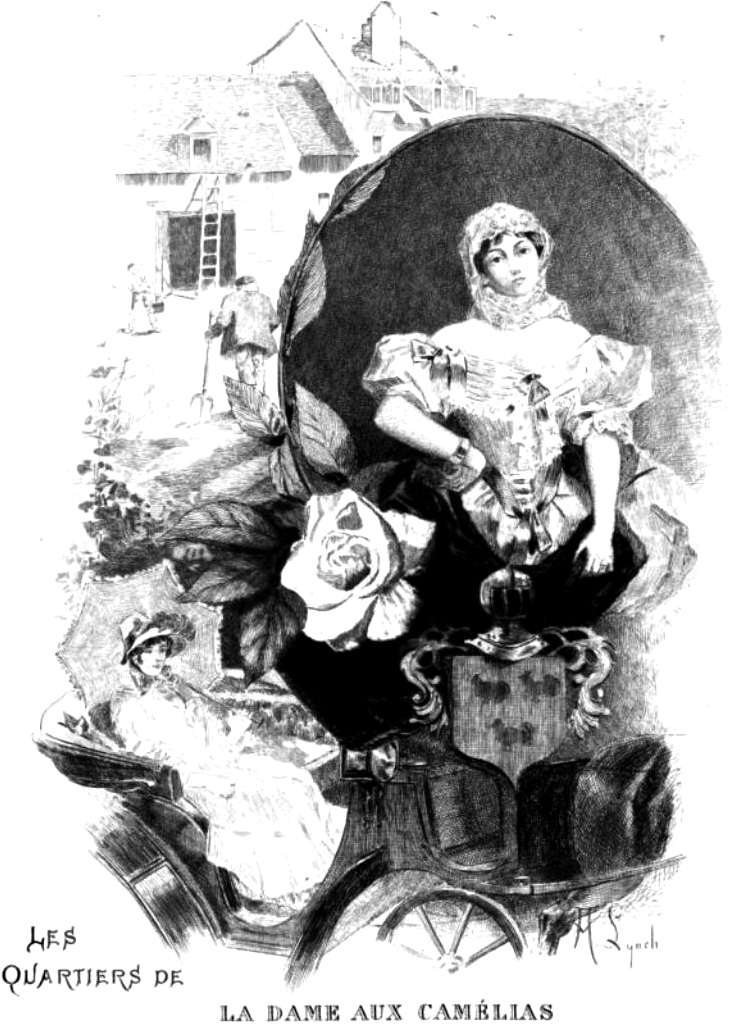
Illustration by Albert Lynch

Written by Alexandre Dumas fils (1824–1895) when he was 23 years old, and first published in 1848, La Dame aux Camélias is a semi-autobiographical novel based on the author's brief love affair with a courtesan, Marie Duplessis. Set in mid-19th-century France, the novel tells the tragic love story between fictional characters Marguerite Gautier, a demimondaine or courtesan suffering from consumption, and Armand Duval, a young bourgeois. Marguerite is nicknamed la dame aux camélias (French for 'the lady of the camellias') because she wears a red camellia when she is menstruating and unavailable for sex and a white camellia when she is available to her lovers.

Armand falls in love with Marguerite and ultimately becomes her lover. He convinces her to leave her life as a courtesan and to live with him in the countryside. This idyllic existence is interrupted by Armand's father, who, concerned with the scandal created by the illicit relationship, and fearful that it will destroy Armand's sister's chances of marriage, convinces Marguerite to leave. Until Marguerite is on her deathbed, Armand believes that she left him for another man, known as Count de Giray. He comes to her side as she is dying, surrounded by her friends, and pledges to love her even after her death.

The story is narrated after Marguerite's death by two men, Armand and an unnamed frame narrator. Near the beginning of the novel, the narrator finds out that Armand has been sending camellia flowers to Marguerite's grave, to show that his love for her will never die.

Some scholars believe that Marguerite's gruesome illness, i.e. tuberculosis, was also employed by Dumas fils as a metaphor that contemporary audiences might have recognised for syphilis; casting “consumption” (a disease that was considered fashionable and alluring in women) as a physical manifestation of the sins of sexual and moral abandon, and Marguerite’s bloodletting and death as a purging of those sins.

Dumas fils is careful to paint a favourable portrait of Marguerite, who despite her past is rendered virtuous by her love for Armand, and the suffering of the two lovers, whose love is shattered by the need to conform to the morals of the times, is rendered touchingly. In contrast to the Chevalier des Grieux's love for Manon in Manon Lescaut (1731), a novel by Abbé Prévost referenced at the beginning of La Dame aux Camélias, Armand's love is for a woman who is ready to sacrifice her riches and her lifestyle for him, but who is thwarted by the arrival of Armand's father. The novel is also marked by the description of Parisian life during the 19th century and the fragile world of the courtesan.

== Stage performances ==
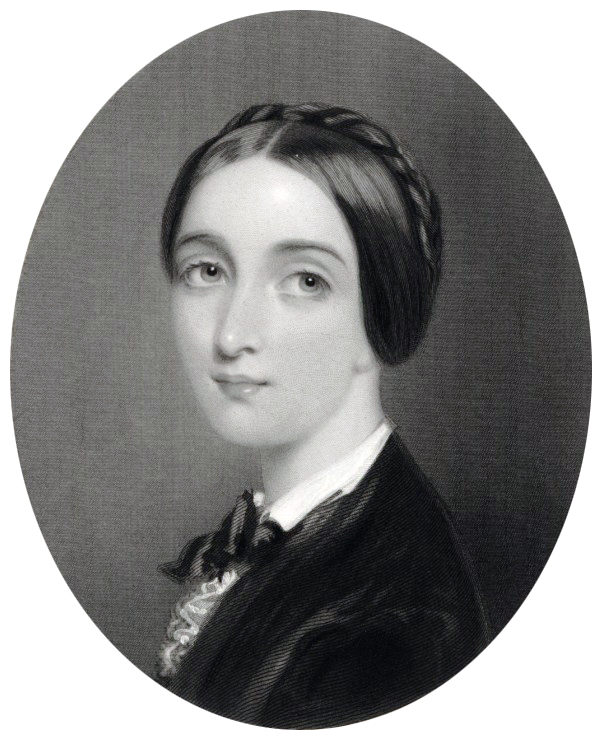
Eugénie Doche created the role of Marguerite Gautier in 1852

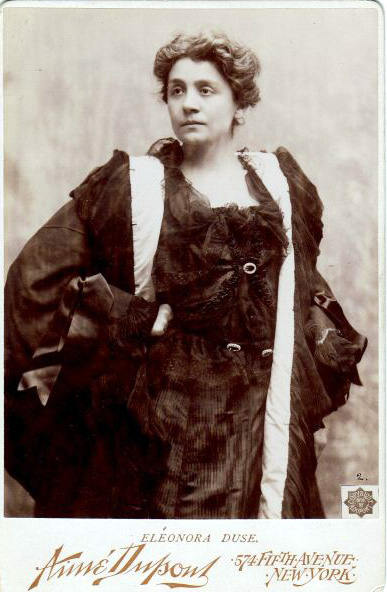
Eleonora Duse as Marguerite Gautier, late 19th century

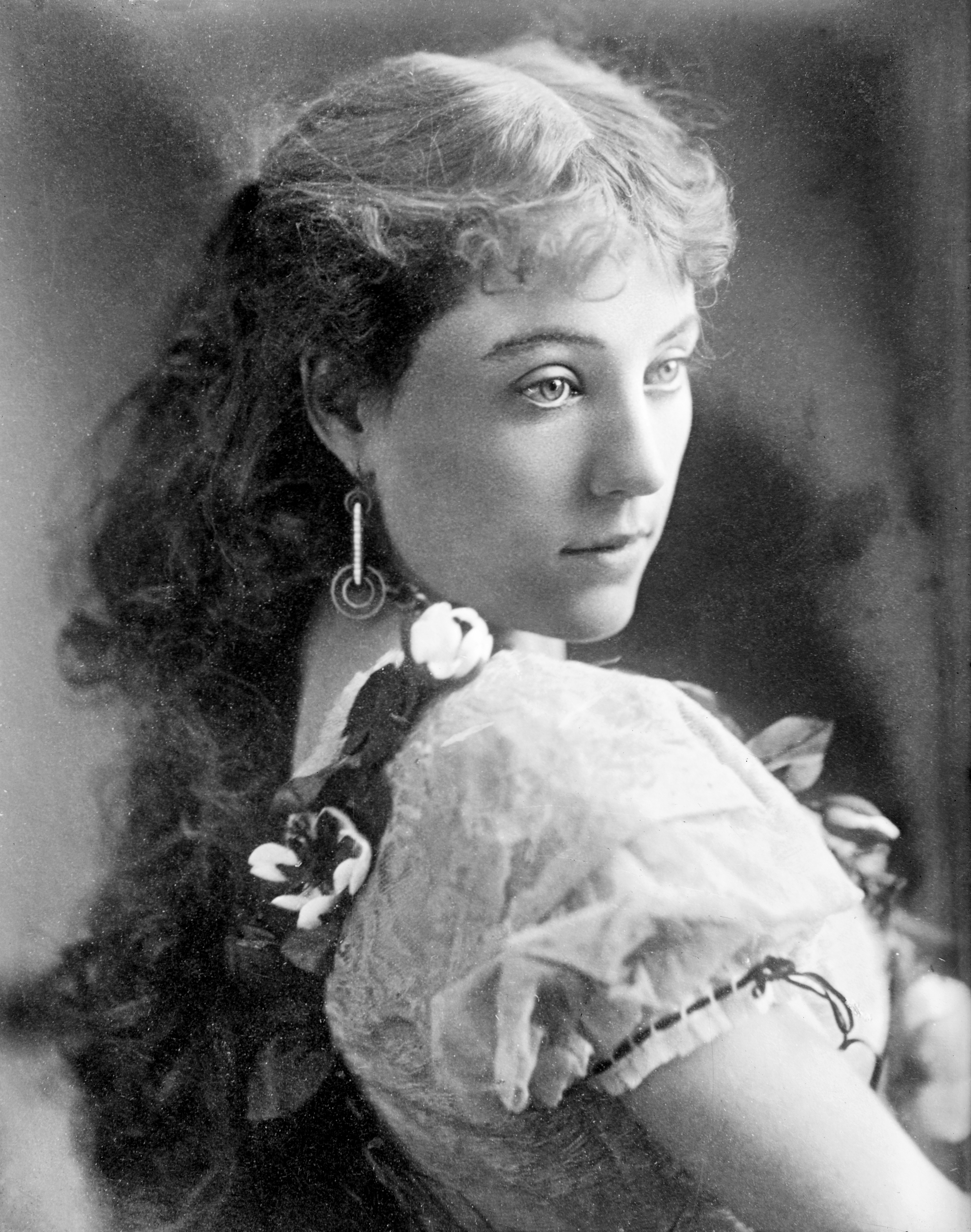
America's most famous interpreter, Clara Morris as Camille (1874)

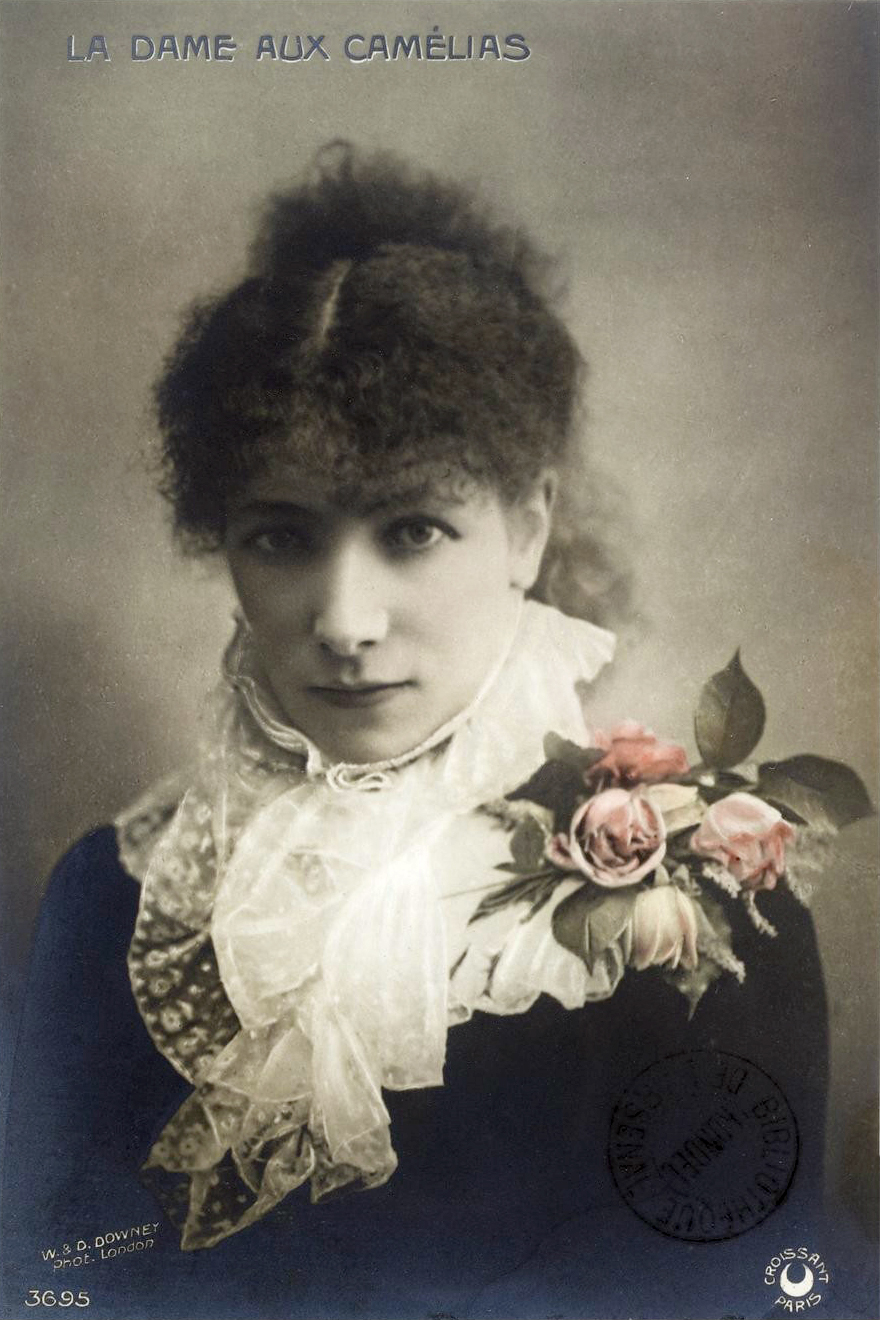
Sarah Bernhardt as Marguerite Gautier (1882)

Dumas fils wrote a stage adaptation that premiered February 2, 1852, at the Théâtre du Vaudeville in Paris. Eugénie Doche created the role of Marguerite Gautier, opposite Charles Fechter as Armand Duval. "I played the role 617 times," Doche recalled not long before her death in 1900, "and I suppose I could not have played it very badly, since Dumas fils wrote in his preface, 'Mme. Doche is not my interpreter, she is my collaborator'."

In 1853, Jean Davenport starred in the first American production of the play, a sanitized version that changed the name of the leading character to Camille—a practice adopted by most American actresses playing the role.

In 1875, Dumas fils's play was adapted by English playwright James Mortimer into the drama Heartsease. This was the first time that La Dame aux Camélias had been granted a public performance in England in any form. The play premiered at the Princess's Theatre in London. The setting was changed to England, and Marguerite Gautier was renamed Constance Hawthorne, now an actress instead of a courtesan. Helen Barry created the role, while William Rignold performed the part of Herbert Maitland, the play's version of Armand. During the play's debut, in an effort to calm a rowdy, disapproving audience, Rignold allegedly cried out, "Stop! You that have wives, or mothers, or daughters- remember that there is a lady on stage!" Helena Modjeska would later make her London debut in a revised version of Heartcease at the Court Theatre.

The role of the tragic Marguerite Gautier became one of the most coveted among actresses and included performances by Sarah Bernhardt, Laura Keene, Eleonora Duse, Margaret Anglin, Gabrielle Réjane, Tallulah Bankhead, Lillian Gish, Dolores del Río, Eva Le Gallienne, Isabelle Adjani, Cacilda Becker, and Helena Modjeska. Bernhardt quickly became associated with the role after starring in Camellias in Paris, London, and several Broadway revivals, plus the 1911 film. The dancer and impresario Ida Rubinstein successfully recreated Bernhardt's interpretation of the role onstage in the mid-1920s, coached by the great actress herself before she died.

Of all Dumas fils's theatrical works, La Dame aux Camélias is the most popular around the world. In 1878, Scribner's Monthly reported that "not one other play by Dumas fils has been received with favor out of France".

== Adaptations ==
=== Opera ===
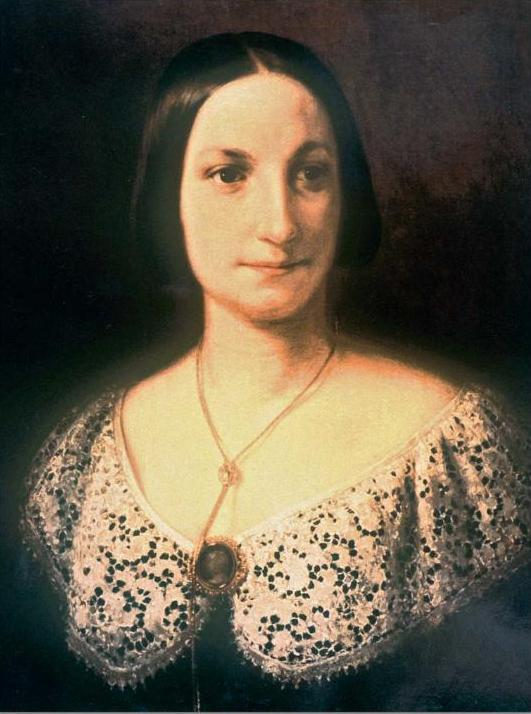
Fanny Salvini-Donatelli, the first Violetta in La traviata (1853)

The success of the play inspired Giuseppe Verdi to put the story to music. His work became the opera La traviata, set to an Italian libretto by Francesco Maria Piave. On March 6, 1853, La traviata opened in Venice, Italy at the La Fenice opera house. The female protagonist, Marguerite Gautier, is renamed Violetta Valéry, and the male protagonist, Armand Duval, is renamed Alfredo Germont.

=== Film ===
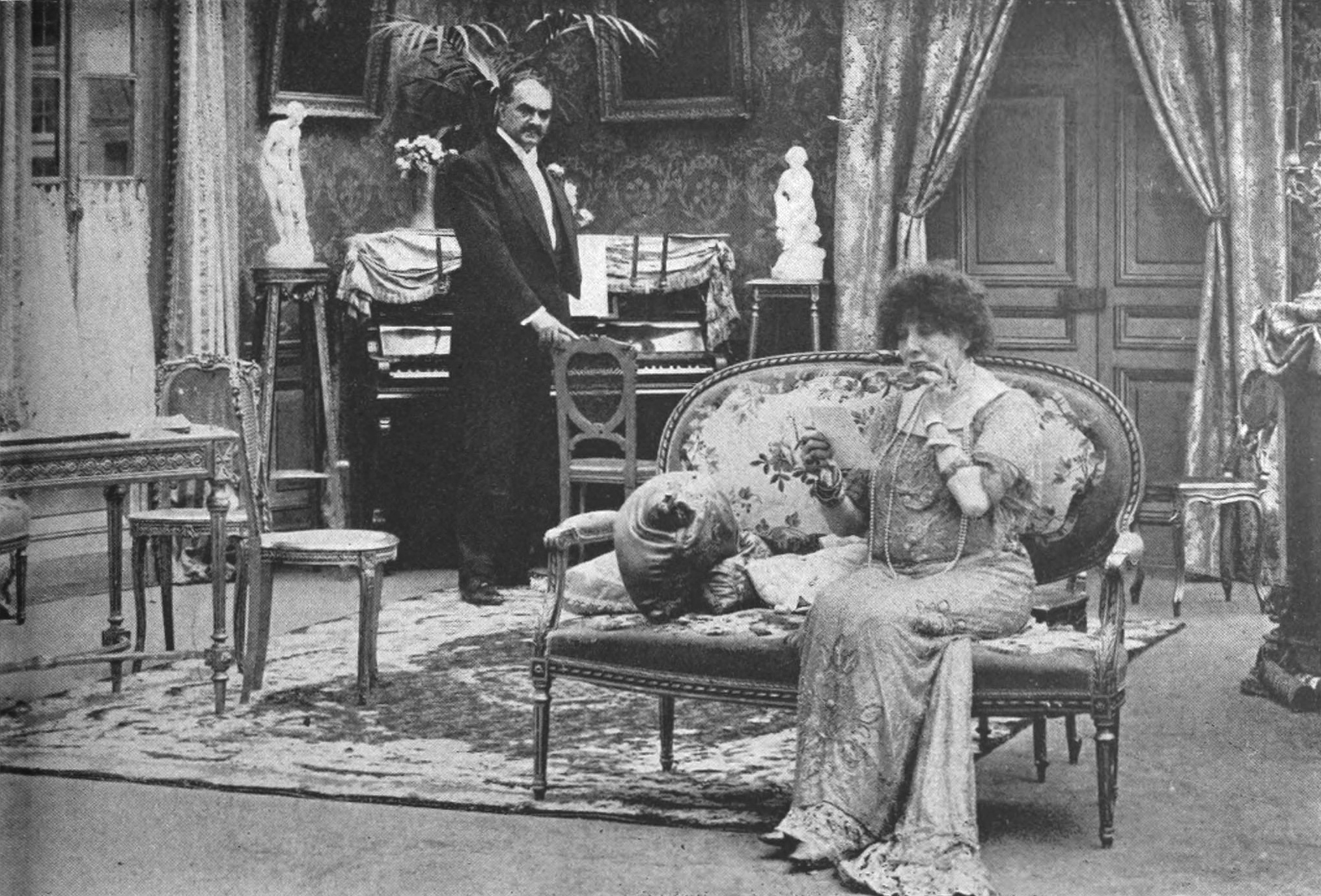
Sarah Bernhardt in the 1911 French film adaptation, with André Calmettes

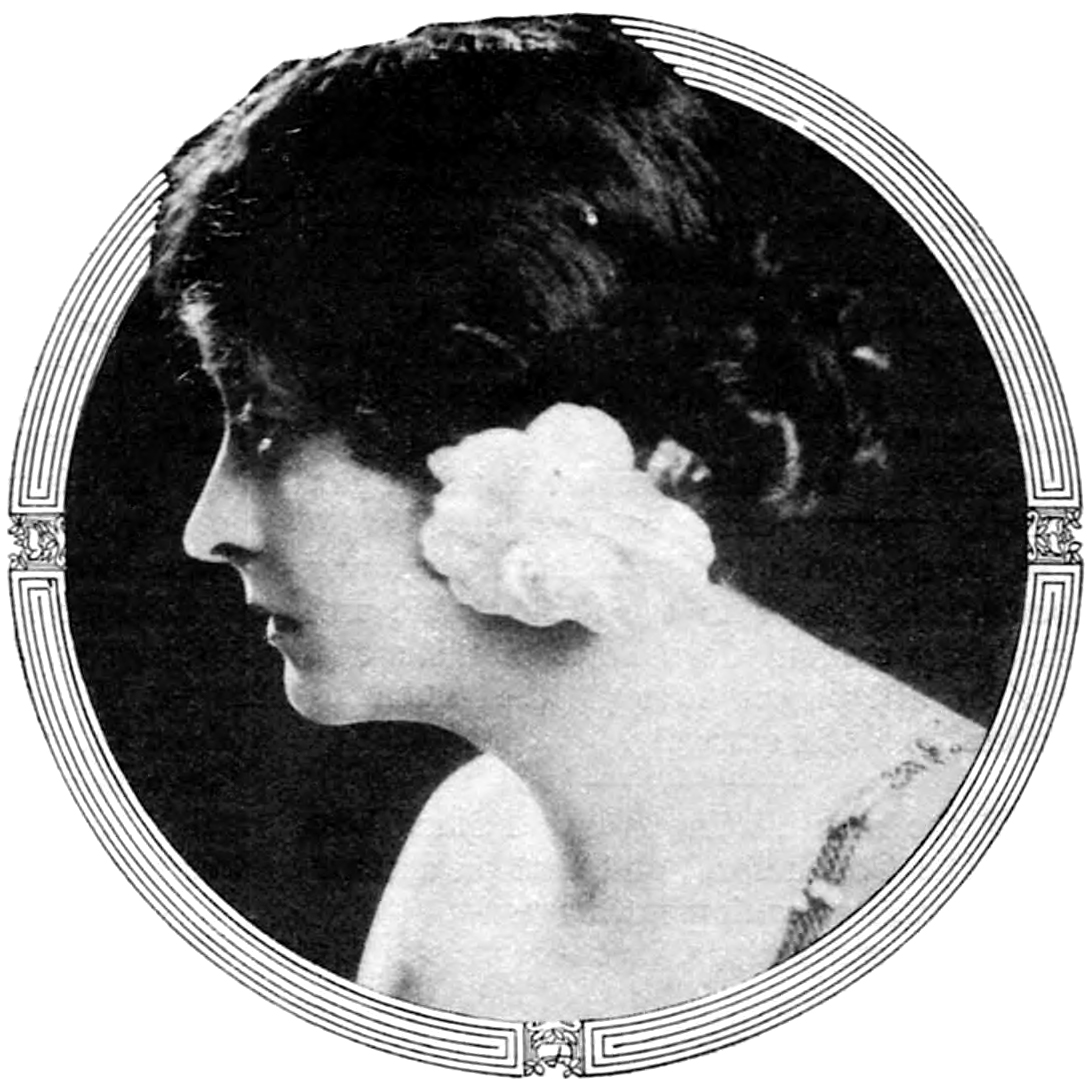
Clara Kimball Young in Camille (1915)

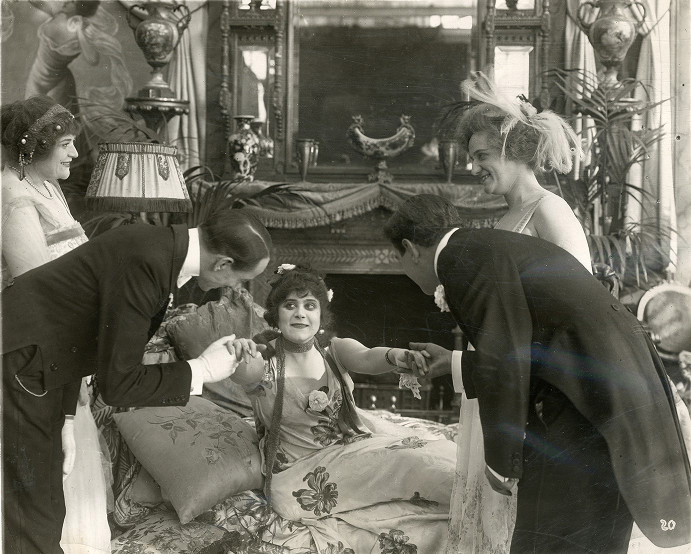
Theda Bara in Camille (1917)

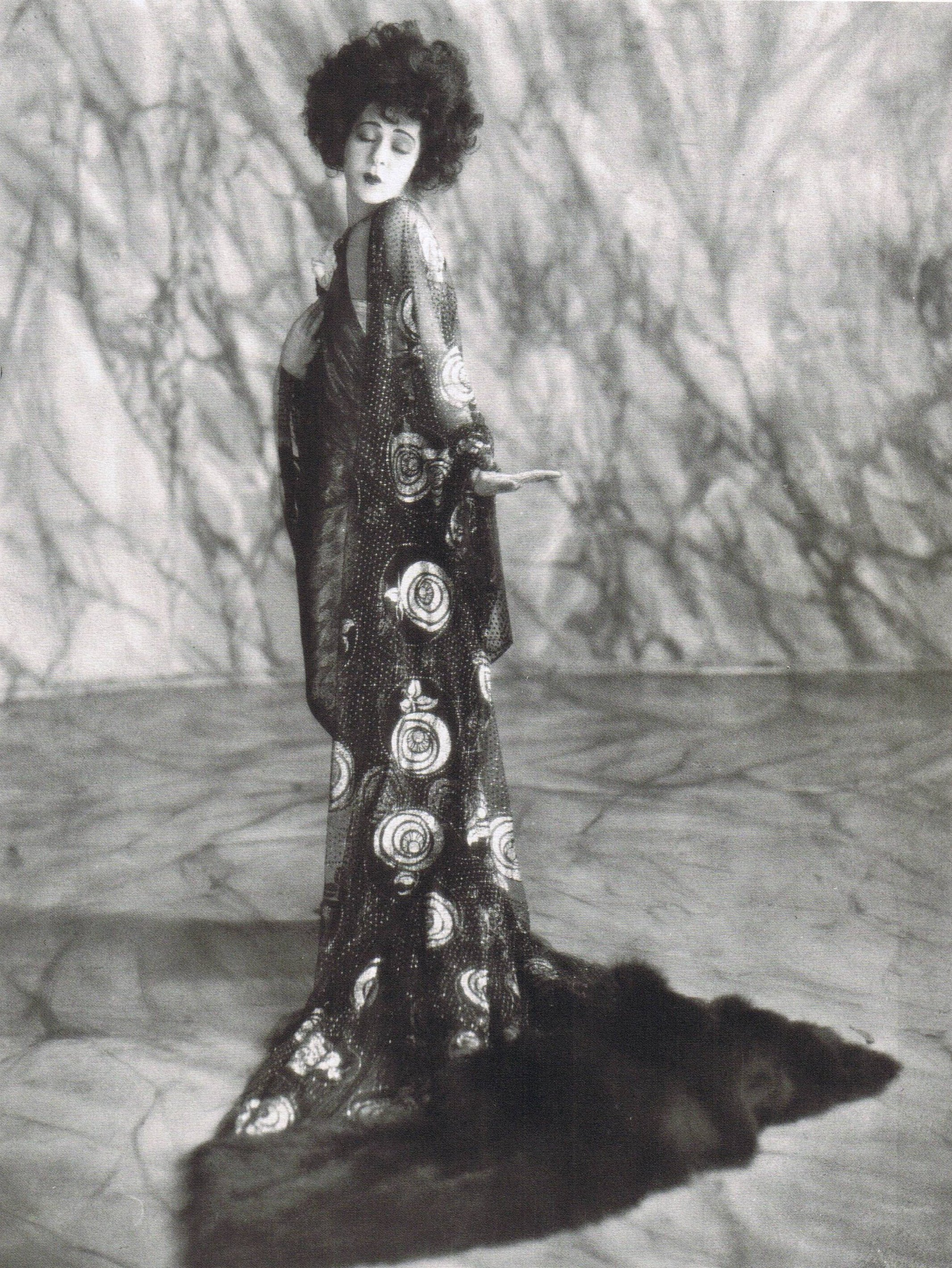
Alla Nazimova in Camille (1921)

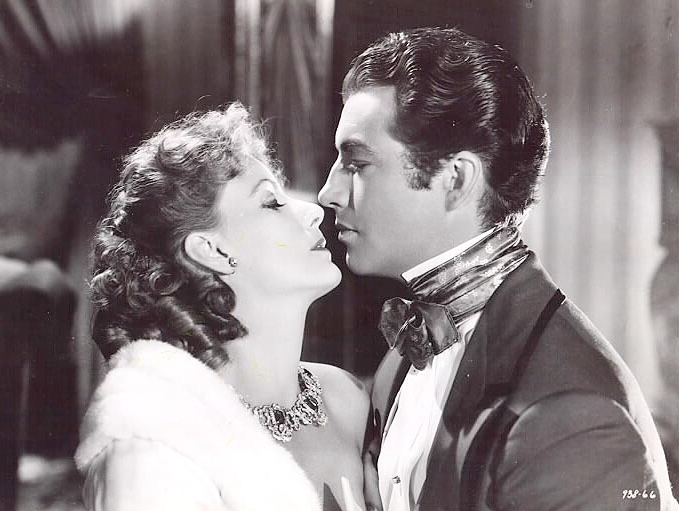
Greta Garbo and Robert Taylor in Camille (1936)

La Dame aux Camélias has been adapted for some 20 different motion pictures in numerous countries and in a wide variety of languages. The role of Marguerite Gautier has been played on screen by Sarah Bernhardt, María Félix, Clara Kimball Young, Theda Bara, Yvonne Printemps, Alla Nazimova, Greta Garbo, Micheline Presle, Francesca Bertini, Isabelle Huppert, and others.

==== Films entitled Camille ====
There have been at least nine adaptations of La Dame aux Camélias entitled Camille.

- Camille (1915), an American silent film adapted by Frances Marion, directed by Albert Capellani, starring Clara Kimball Young as Camille and Paul Capellani as Armand
- Camille (1917), an American silent film adapted by Adrian Johnson, directed by J. Gordon Edwards, starring Theda Bara as Camille and Alan Roscoe as Armand
- Camille (1921), an American silent film starring Alla Nazimova as Camille and Rudolph Valentino as Armand
- Camille (1926), an American silent film directed by Fred Niblo, starring Norma Talmadge as Camille and Gilbert Roland as Armand
- Camille: The Fate of a Coquette (1926), an American short film by Ralph Barton, compiled from his home movies, loosely based on La Dame aux Camélias
- Camille (1936), an American film directed by George Cukor, starring Greta Garbo as Camille and Robert Taylor as Armand
- Camille 2000 (1969), an Italian film adapted by Michael DeForrest, directed by Radley Metzger, starring Danielle Gaubert as Marguerite and Nino Castelnuovo as Armand
- Camille (1981), commonly known as La Dame aux Camélias or Lady of the Camellias (Italian: La storia vera della signora dalle camelie, lit. 'the true story of the lady of the camellias'), a French-Italian film directed by Mauro Bolognini, starring Isabelle Huppert as Alphonsine
- Camille (1984), a television film adapted by Blanche Hanalis, directed by Desmond Davis, starring Greta Scacchi as Camille and Colin Firth as Armand
- Camille (1998), a French television film directed by Jean-Claude Brialy, starring Cristiana Reali as Camille and Michaël Cohen as Armand

==== Other films based on La Dame aux Camélias ====
In addition to the Camille films, the story has been the adapted into numerous other screen versions:

- Kameliadamen, the first movie based on the work. Kameliadamen was a 1907 Danish silent film directed by Viggo Larsen and starring Oda Alstrup, Larsen, Gustave Lund and Robert Storm Petersen.
- La Dame aux Camélias, a 1911 French-language silent film, directed by André Calmettes and Henri Pouctal. It stars Sarah Bernhardt, Lou Tellegen and Paul Capellani.
- La Signora delle Camelie, a 1915 Italian-language silent film. It was directed by Baldassarre Negroni. It stars Hesperia, Alberto Collo and Ida Carloni Talli.
- La Signora delle Camelie, a 1915 Italian-language silent film. It was directed by Gustavo Serena. It stars Francesca Bertini and Serena.
- Prima Vera (aka Die Kameliendame) (1917), a German-language silent film starring Erna Morena.
- Arme Violetta (1920), a German-language silent film starring Pola Negri.
- Damen med kameliorna, a 1925 Swedish-language film adapted and directed by Olof Molander, starring Uno Henning and Tora Teje.
- La Dame aux Camélias (1934), the first sound adaptation, was a French-language film adapted by Abel Gance and directed by Gance and Fernand Rivers. It starred Yvonne Printemps and Pierre Fresnay.
- Laila (1942), an Egyptian musical film starring Laila Mourad.
- A 1944 Spanish-language version The Lady of the Camellias was produced in Mexico. It was adapted by Roberto Tasker, directed by Gabriel Soria, and starred Lina Montes and Emilio Tuero.
- A 1947 Italian version The Lady of the Camellias directed by Carmine Gallone and starring Nelly Corradi
- La Dame aux Camélias, a 1953 French-language film adapted by Jacques Natanson and directed by Raymond Bernard, starring Gino Cervi, Micheline Presle and Roland Alexandre.
- Traviata '53, a 1953 Italian-language film adapted and directed by Vittorio Cottafavi, starring Barbara Laage, Armando Francioli and Eduardo De Filippo.
- La mujer de las camelias, a 1953 Argentine film adapted by Alexis de Arancibia (as Wassen Eisen) and Ernesto Arancibia, and directed by Ernesto Arancibia. It stars Zully Moreno.
- Camelia, a 1954 Mexican film directed by Roberto Gavaldón, and stars María Félix.
- Kamelyalı Kadın, 1957 Turkish film starring Çolpan İlhan.
- The Lady of the Camellias, a 1976 UK television serial, starring Kate Nelligan.
- La Dame aux Camélias, a 1981 French-language film adapted by Jean Aurenche, Enrico Medioli and Vladimir Pozner, and directed by Mauro Bolognini, starring Isabelle Huppert.
- Dama Kameliowa, a 1994 Polish-language film
- Moulin Rouge! (2001), directed by Baz Luhrmann, starring Nicole Kidman and Ewan McGregor.

=== Ballet ===
- Lady of the Camellias is a ballet by John Neumeier with music by Frédéric Chopin, created for Marcia Haydée, then prima ballerina of the Stuttgart Ballet. It premiered at the Staatstheater Stuttgart in 1978.
- Lady of the Camellias is a ballet by Val Caniparoli with music by Frédéric Chopin. It premiered with Ballet Florida at the Raymond Kravis Center in 1994.
- Marguerite and Armand is an adaptation created in 1963 by renowned choreographer Sir Frederick Ashton specifically for Rudolf Nureyev and prima ballerina assoluta Dame Margot Fonteyn.
- Veronica Paeper created a ballet Camille based on The Lady of the Camellias which has been staged several times since 1990.
- "La Traviata" is a ballet created by Maria Eugenia Barrios for the Caracas Contemporary Ballet in 1996 to music by Giuseppe Verdi. The ballet included the Tenor, Baritone and Soprano arias from Verdi's opera. The role of Marguerite Gautier was interpreted by Maria Barrios who danced and also sang the Soprano arias. It was staged many times in Caracas Teresa Carreno theatre and other cities .

=== Stage ===
Terrence Rattigan's 1958 play Variation on a Theme is a loose retelling of La Dame aux Camellias.

Amongst many adaptations, spin-offs, and parodies, was Camille, "a travesty on La Dame aux Camellias by Charles Ludlam, staged first by his own Ridiculous Theatrical Company in 1973, with Ludlam playing the lead in drag.

In 1999 Alexia Vassiliou collaborated with composer Aristides Mytaras for the contemporary dance performance, La Dame aux Camélias at the Amore Theatre in Athens.

It is also the inspiration for the 2008 musical Marguerite, which places the story in 1944 German-occupied France.

=== Novels ===
In My Ántonia by Willa Cather, the characters Jim Burden and Lena Lingard are much moved by a theatrical production of Camille, which they attend in book 3, chapter 3. Love Story, published by Eric Segal in 1970, has essentially the same plot updated to contemporary New York. The conflict here centres on the relative economic classes of the central characters.

== In popular culture ==
The phrase "Courage, Camille!", first found in the 1857 English translation of Dumas' play, becomes among actors in the United States, a stock phrase to encourage oneself or others. The phrase is already established as a cliche in the U.S. acting world by 1913:

"A promising start!" she thought, with a meager smile, as she unpacked her trunk in her little drygoods box of a dressing-room. "If this were going to keep up--But it isn't. 'Courage, Camille!" she exhorted herself, with the actors' slang quotation.

and in subsequent decades:

“Wouldn’t you just love to play that part and have Albert Roscoe whisper in your ear, ‘Courage, Camille ; you will live till spring’ ?”(1917)

We trade handsome checks with the understanding that they are to be used for window dressing only. The neighbors are impressed, if we don't show them to the same ones. Or are they? Maybe they are working the same game. Meanwhile the family list and a few handpicked friends must be satisfied. Courage, Camille! Are we down-hearted? Not a bit. Off we go, to the Five-and Ten! (1929)

She would look away from them as she talked, or through them, seeing perhaps an audience of farmers, a rude stage, and Handsome Ed leaning over her, whispering in his voice that filled the tent: "Courage, Camille. You will live until spring!" She was shy, but she was hard and bitter too for many weeks.(1930)

In the 1940 ghost-comedy film The Ghost Breakers, Bob Hope's character often uses the quote to encourage himself and others, and that seems to be the source of later uses in United States popular culture, including in the first episode of Season 7 of M*A*S*H (TV series).
