= Nonant-le-Pin =

- Part of Merlerault-le-Pin
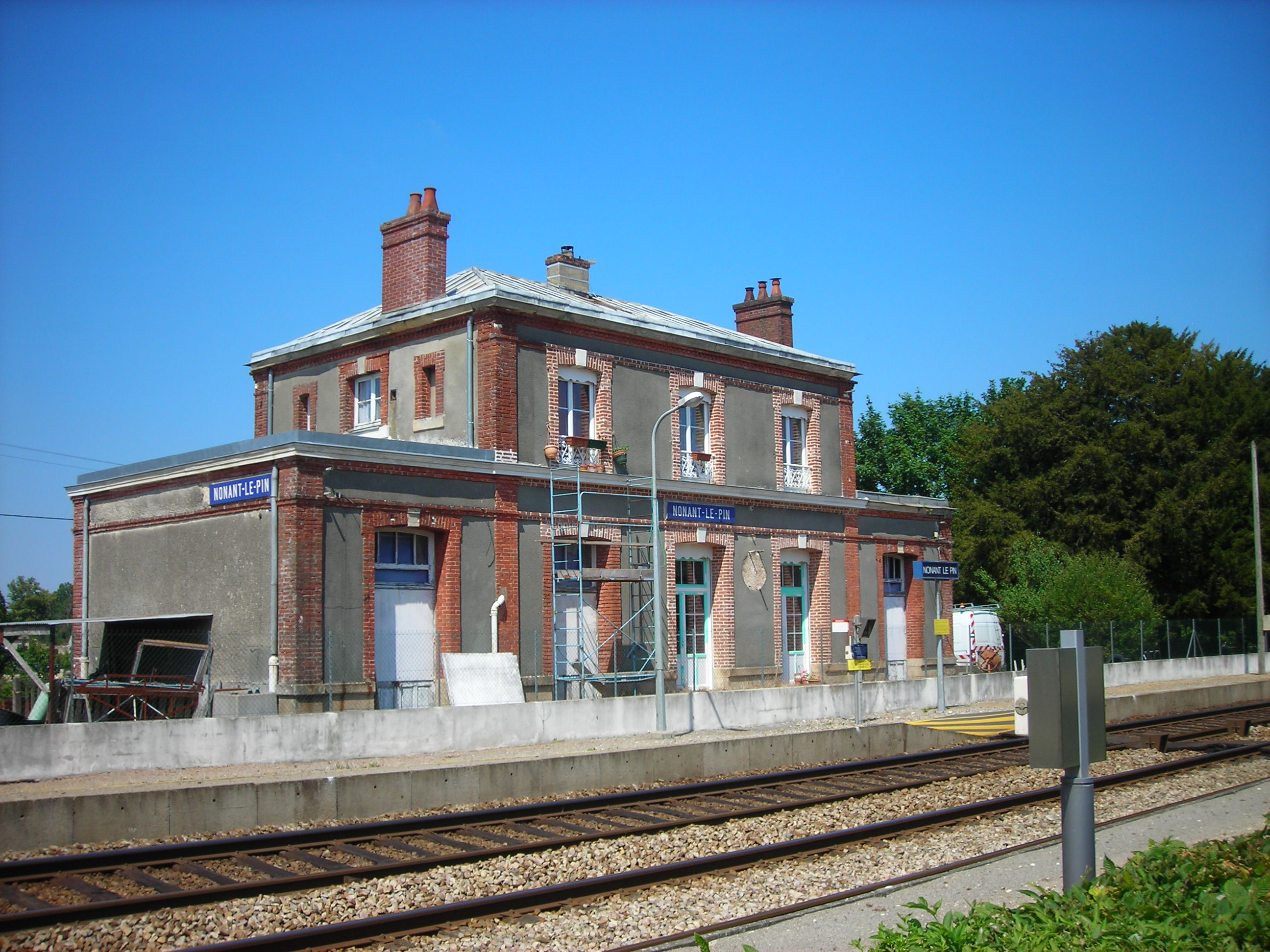
- The railway station in Nonant-le-Pin
- Location of Nonant-le-Pin
- Location within France Location within Normandy
- Coordinates: 48°42′26″N 0°13′18″E
- Country: France
- Region: Normandy
- Department: Orne
- Arrondissement: Mortagne-au-Perche
- Canton: Rai
- Commune: Merlerault-le-Pin
- Area^{1}: 18.44 km^{2} (7.12 sq mi)
- Elevation: 199 m (653 ft)
- Highest elevation: 251 m (823 ft)
- Lowest elevation: 180 m (590 ft)
- Population (2022): 411
  - Density: 22.3/km^{2} (57.7/sq mi)
- Demonym: Nonantais
- Time zone: UTC+01:00 (CET)
  - Summer (DST): UTC+02:00 (CEST)
- Postal code: 61240
- ^{1} French Land Register data, which excludes lakes, ponds, glaciers > 1 km^{2} (0.386 sq mi or 247 acres) and river estuaries.

Nonant-le-Pin (French pronunciation: [nɔnɑ̃ lə pɛ̃]) is a former commune in the Orne department in north-western France. On 1 January 2025, it was merged into the new commune of Merlerault-le-Pin.

== Geography ==
The commune is made up of the following collection of villages and hamlets, La Butte,La Reboursière, La Chauvinière, Les Terres Noires,Les Mandrettes and Nonant-le-Pin.

The former Commune is within the Natura 2000 protected area of Bocages et vergers du sud Pays d'Auge.

The former commune is part of a 20,593 hectare, Natura 2000 conservation area, called the Haute vallée de l'Orne et affluents.

Nonant-le-Pin has 2 rivers that run through it, the Dieuge and the Ure.

== Notable people ==
- Charles-Paul Landon (1760 - 1826), a French painter and popular writer on art and artists, was born here.
- Marie Duplessis (1824-1847), a French courtesan and mistress to a number of prominent and wealthy men was born here. She was the inspiration for Marguerite Gautier, the main character of the 1848 novel The Lady of the Camellias.

== See also ==
- Communes of the Orne department

== Notable residents ==
- Marie Duplessis
