= The Lady of the Camellias (1925 film) =

1925 film

- Directed by: Olof Molander
- Written by: Olof Molander
- Based on: The Lady of the Camellias by Alexandre Dumas
- Starring: Tora Teje; Uno Henning; Nils Aréhn
- Cinematography: Gustav A. Gustafson
- Production company: Bewefilm
- Distributed by: Svenska Biografteaterns Filmbyrå
- Release date: 12 October 1925
- Running time: 89 minutes
- Country: Sweden
- Languages: Silent; Swedish intertitles

The Lady of the Camellias (Swedish: Damen med kameliorna) is a 1925 Swedish silent historical drama film directed by Olof Molander and starring Tora Teje, Uno Henning and Nils Aréhn. It was shot at the Råsunda Studios in Stockholm. The film's sets were designed by the art director Vilhelm Bryde. It is an adaptation of the 1848 novel The Lady of the Camellias by Alexandre Dumas.

== Cast ==
- Tora Teje as Marguerite Gautier
- Uno Henning as Armand Duval
- Nils Aréhn as George Duval
- Hilda Borgström as Prudence
- Paul Lane as Erneste de Giray
- Sven Bergvall as Alphonse de Varville
- Carl Browallius as Duke de Mauriac
- Torsten Winge as Gaston
- Alfred Lundberg as Morizot
- Lisskulla Jobs as Blanche Duval
- Ragnar Arvedson as Blanche's Fiancé
- Anders Henrikson as The Duke's Spy
- Tore Lindwall as Gustave
- Margit Manstad as Nichette
- Bertil Ehrenmark as Servant
- Justus Hagman as Joseph
- Thure Holm as Doctor
- Knut Lambert as Guest of Marguerite
- Ester Textorius as Olympe
- Tom Walter as Errand Boy

== Bibliography ==
- Qvist, Per Olov & von Bagh, Peter. Guide to the Cinema of Sweden and Finland. Greenwood Publishing Group, 2000.
