= Édouard Viénot =

French painter (1804–1872)

Édouard Viénot (French: [edwaʁ vjeno]; 13 September 1804 – 1872) was a French portrait painter.

== Biography ==
He was born in Fontainebleau, on 13 September 1804. He entered the École des Beaux Arts in Paris on 4 October 1822.

Viénot is probably to be identified with "Le chevalier Viennot" who was active as a portrait painter in London in 1826 and 1827, when he had an address at 20 York Street, Portman Square. From this address he exhibited two paintings at the Royal Academy in 1826 (Miss Paton of Covent Garden Theatre and Sir Robert Shaw, Bart., of Dublin) and three paintings at the Society of British Artists (now the Royal Society of British Artists) in 1827 (Portrait of Miss Paton, presumably the same as the Royal Academy picture, Portrait of Madame Viennot, presumably the artist's wife or mother, and Portrait of the Marchioness of Downshire). All three of these paintings are catalogued in the "watercolour, miniature or print" category.

In France, Viénot's paintings were regularly selected by the jury of the Paris Salon between 1831 and 1870, and included Portrait du lieutenant-colonele baron S... and Portrait de Mademoiselle Delille, artiste de l'Opéra Comique, dans le 2me acte des Diamants de la Couronne (both at the Paris Salon 1846); Étude de Femme; Portrait de Monsieur S... and Portrait de Madame S... (all at the Paris Salon 1857); Miss [sic] P. N. J...; étude (Paris Salon 1859); Portrait de Mademoiselle Jeanne Tordeus, du théâtre impérial de l'Odéon (Paris Salon 1861); Portrait de Madame A. Musard (Paris Salon 1863); Portrait de Madame ... (Paris Salon 1864); Portrait de Mademoiselle Guerra du Théâtre-Italien and Portrait de Monsieur Saint-Germain du théâtre du Vaudeville (both at the Paris Salon 1865); Portrait de Mademoiselle B. de C... (Paris Salon 1866); Portrait de Madame L. D. R... and Portrait de Monsieur A. L... (both at the Paris Salon 1870).

Viénot also painted Marie Duplessis (reproduced in the Royal Opera's programme for Verdi's 1853 opera La Traviata at the Royal Albert Hall in May 1998). Marie Duplessis was the real-life actress and courtesane on whom Dumas modelled the heroine in his 1848 novel La Dame aux Camélias, on which La Traviata is based.

Viénot's portrait of the Emperor Pedro II of Brazil is in the Imperial Museum in Brazil (housed in what was formerly his summer palace). Also in Brazil is his Retrato de Menina [a portrait of a young girl in a blue dress] which hangs in the Museu Regional de São João del-Rei.

Viénot identified himself in the Salon catalogues as a pupil of Guérin and Hersent. Paulin Guérin (1783-1855), official painter to the royal family and aristocracy in the reigns of Louis XVIII and Charles X, was "one of the most prominent portrait painters of the Restoration" (Dictionary of Art (1996) vol 13, pp 790–791). Louis Hersent (1777-1860) was a gold medallist at the Salon of 1806, elected a member of the Institut 1822, and appointed professor at the Ecole des Beaux-Arts 1825.

Viénot died in 1872, aged 68 .

Viénot did some portraits for different Spanish families established in South America during that period. A sample of them are the portraits he did for the family González del Collado.

== Gallery ==
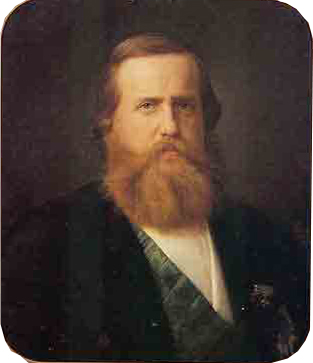
Pedro II of Brazil

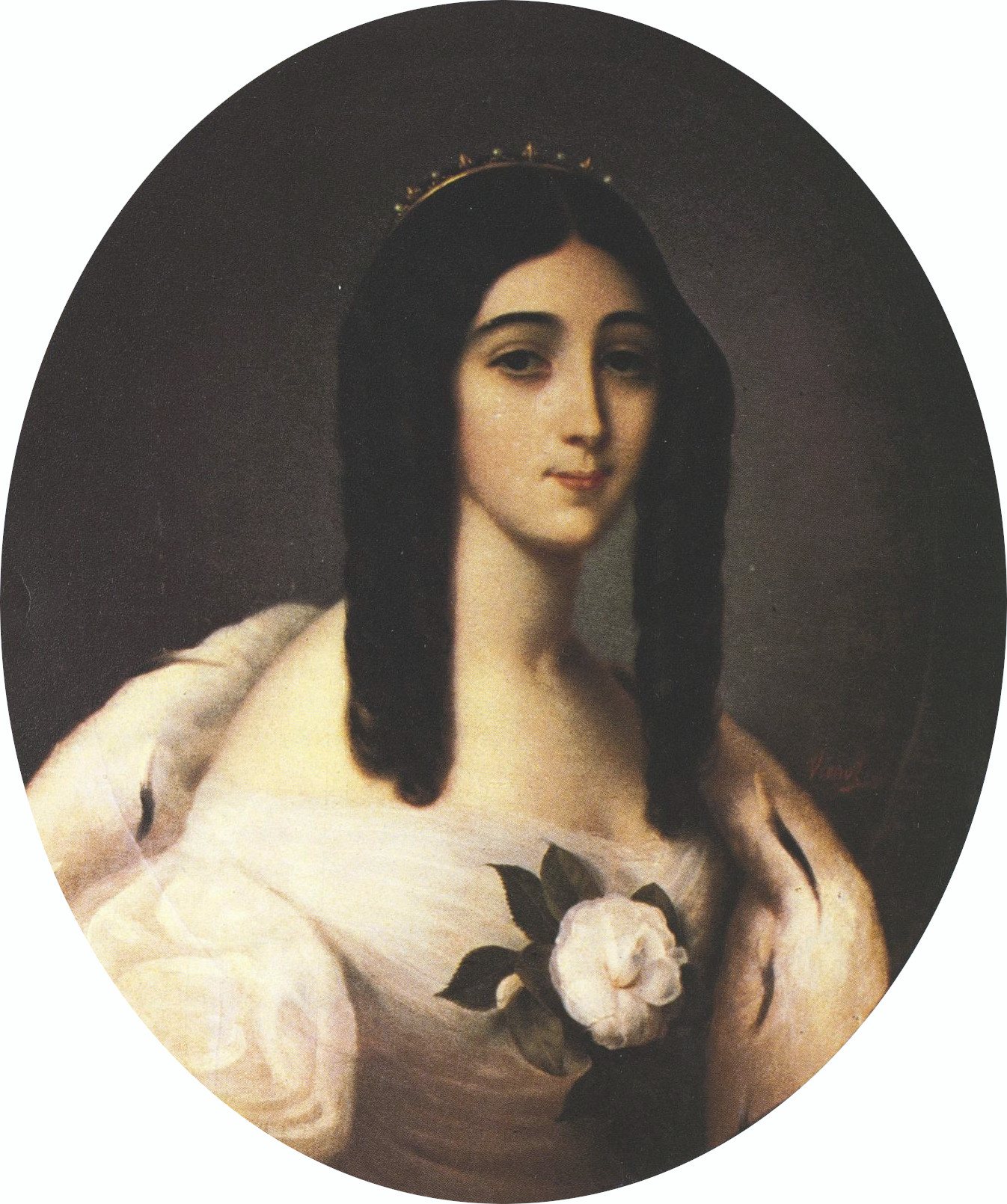
Marie Duplessis

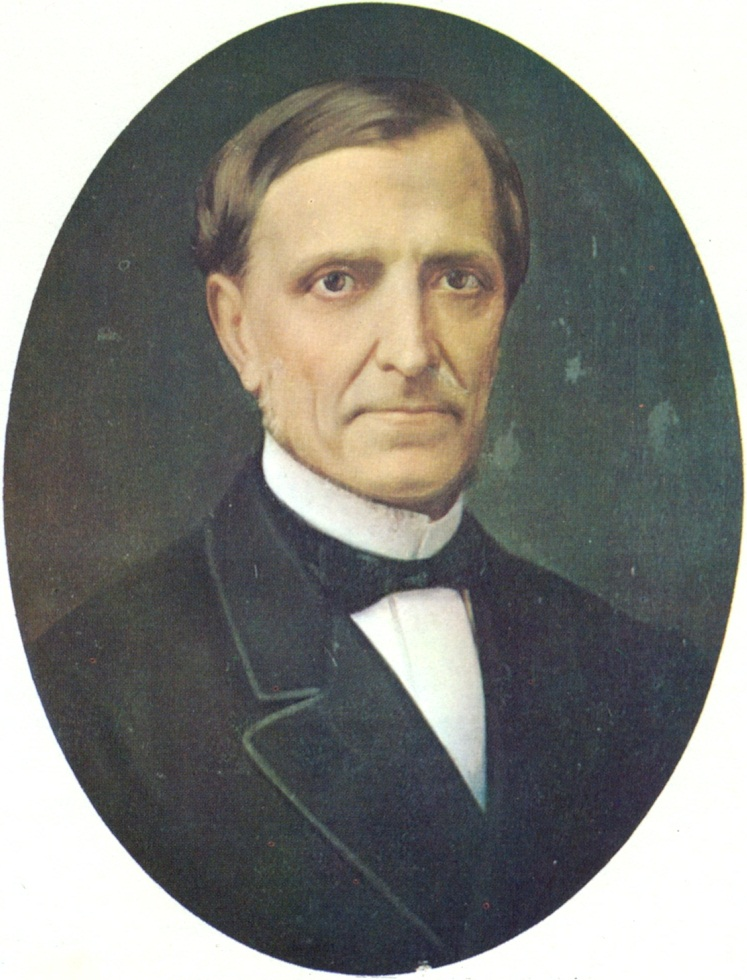
Irineu Evangelista de Sousa
