= Getting Married (1926 film) =

1926 film

- Directed by: Olof Molander
- Written by: Per-Axel Branner
- Based on: Getting Married by August Strindberg
- Starring: Olof Winnerstrand; Tora Teje; Hilda Borgström
- Cinematography: Gustav A. Gustafson
- Production company: Bewefilm
- Distributed by: Svenska Biografteaterns Filmbyrå
- Release date: 1 March 1926
- Running time: 69 minutes
- Country: Sweden
- Languages: Silent; Swedish intertitles

Getting Married (Swedish: Giftas) is a 1926 Swedish silent drama film directed by Olof Molander and starring Olof Winnerstrand, Tora Teje and Hilda Borgström. It is based on the short story collection Getting Married by August Strindberg, specifically the story A Doll's House which he had written is response to Henrik Ibsen's 1879 play A Doll's House.

== Cast ==
- Olof Winnerstrand as Paul Rosenkrans
- Tora Teje as Signe Rosenkrans
- Hilda Borgström as Annie Behrman
- Margit Manstad as Lady from the train
- Uno Henning as Lieutenant
- Mona Geijer-Falkner as Annie's maid
- Einar Axelsson as Student

== Bibliography ==
- Gustafsson, Tommy. Masculinity in the Golden Age of Swedish Cinema: A Cultural Analysis of 1920s Films. McFarland, 2014.
