= Les Authieux-du-Puits =

- Part of Merlerault-le-Pin
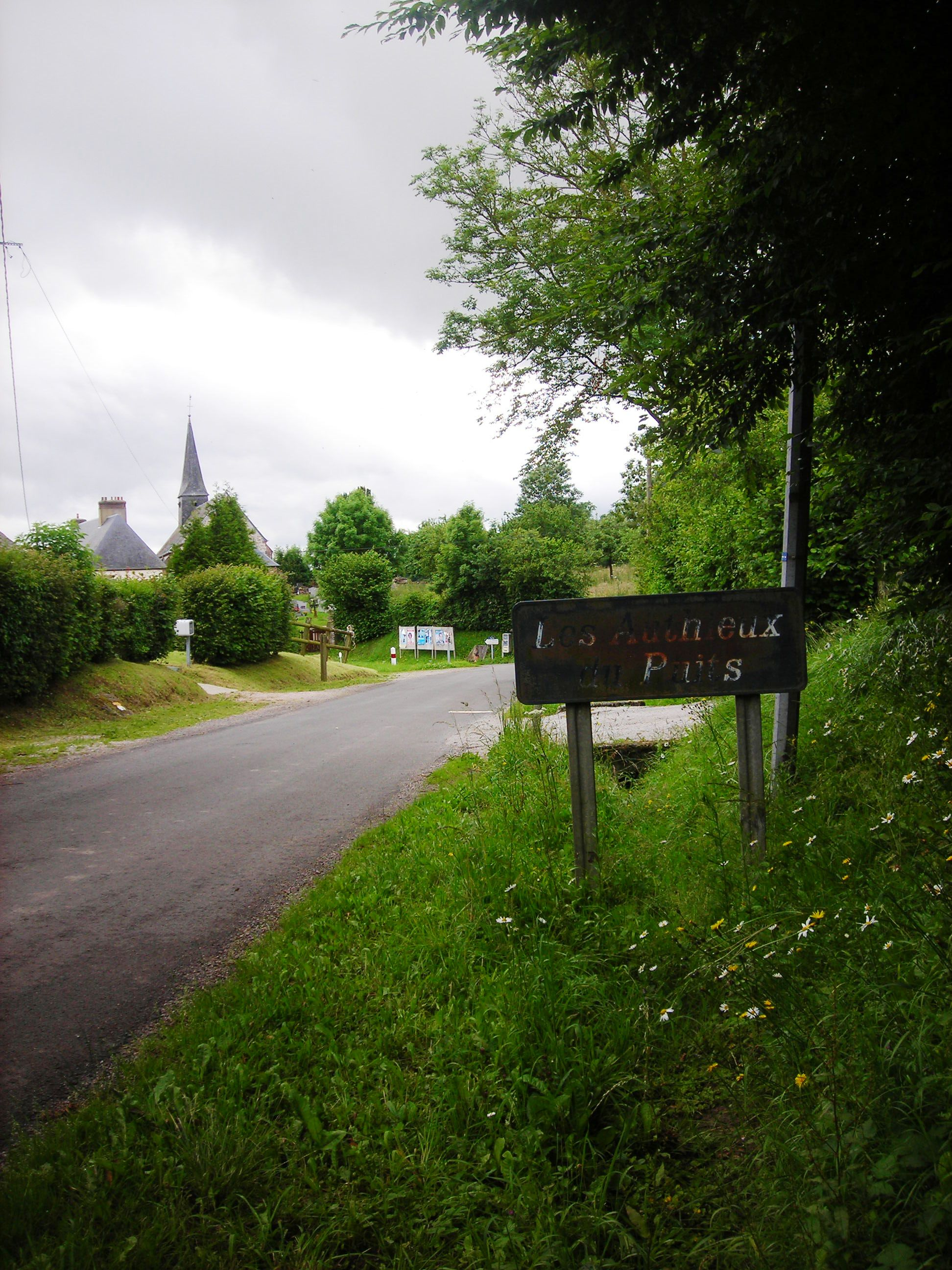
- The road into Les Authieux-du-Puits
- Location of Les Authieux-du-Puits
- Location within France Location within Normandy
- Coordinates: 48°42′47″N 0°19′49″E
- Country: France
- Region: Normandy
- Department: Orne
- Arrondissement: Mortagne-au-Perche
- Canton: Rai
- Commune: Merlerault-le-Pin
- Area^{1}: 4.43 km^{2} (1.71 sq mi)
- Elevation: 240 m (790 ft)
- Highest elevation: 302 m (991 ft)
- Lowest elevation: 214 m (702 ft)
- Population (2022): 76
  - Density: 17/km^{2} (44/sq mi)
- Time zone: UTC+01:00 (CET)
  - Summer (DST): UTC+02:00 (CEST)
- Postal code: 61240
- ^{1} French Land Register data, which excludes lakes, ponds, glaciers > 1 km^{2} (0.386 sq mi or 247 acres) and river estuaries.

Les Authieux-du-Puits (French pronunciation: [le.z‿otjø dy pɥi]) is a former commune in the Orne department in northwestern France. On 1 January 2025, it was merged into the new commune of Merlerault-le-Pin.

== Geography ==
The former Commune is within the Natura 2000 protected area of Bocages et vergers du sud Pays d'Auge.

The former commune is part of a 20,593 hectare, Natura 2000 conservation area, called the Haute vallée de l'Orne et affluents.

== Population ==
Historical population
Year	Pop.	±% p.a.
1968	105	—
1975	98	−0.98%
1982	60	−6.77%
1990	62	+0.41%
1999	72	+1.68%
2009	70	−0.28%
2014	66	−1.17%
2020	82	+3.68%
Source: INSEE

== See also ==
- Communes of the Orne department
