= A Cottage on Dartmoor =

1929 British film by Anthony Asquith

- UK DVD cover
- Directed by: Anthony Asquith
- Written by: Anthony Asquith; Herbert Price
- Produced by: Harry Bruce Woolfe
- Starring: Norah Baring; Uno Henning
- Cinematography: Stanley Rodwell
- Distributed by: British Instructional Films
- Release date: October 1929
- Running time: 87 minutes
- Country: United Kingdom
- Languages: Sound (Part-Talkie); English Intertitles

A Cottage on Dartmoor (a.k.a. Escape from Dartmoor) is a 1929 British part-talkie sound film, directed by Anthony Asquith and starring Norah Baring, Uno Henning and Hans Adalbert Schlettow. The cameraman was Stanley Rodwell. In addition to a sequence with audible dialogue or a talking sequence, the film also featured a synchronized musical score with sound effects and English intertitles. The soundtrack was recorded with the Tobis-Klangfilm sound-on-film system which used the Tri-Ergon sound recording process. A cut-down edited silent version was made for theatres that had not yet converted to sound, but this version is no longer extant.

It was the last of Asquith's films before fully converting to all-talking pictures. The film was produced during the transition period from silents to talkies in British cinema, a point which is referenced in the film itself. The film is extant.

== Plot ==
A Cottage on Dartmoor (1929)

Joe works as a barber in a shop in a Devon town, alongside a manicurist called Sally. He is infatuated with her and asks her out on a date; however the evening turns out awkwardly and it is clear that Sally does not reciprocate Joe's feelings. Despite Sally's lack of interest and through a misunderstanding involving a floral buttonhole, Joe's infatuation with her develops into obsession. Meanwhile, a regular client at the salon, young gentleman farmer Harry, begins to woo Sally, who is much more receptive to his attentions.

The couple begin seeing each other, and one evening arrange to go to the local cinema. Unknown to them they are stalked by the jealous and overwrought Joe, who sits behind them and is forced to witness their obvious happiness together, eventually rushing out of the cinema in despair.

The following day Harry comes into the shop for his regular shave and manicure, and Joe notices that Sally is wearing an engagement ring. A verbal confrontation between Joe and Harry escalates into a physical struggle, during which Harry is slashed by Joe's cut-throat razor. Sally is convinced that Joe had deliberately tried to kill his rival, and following his arrest and trial Joe is convicted of attempted murder. Vowing revenge on Sally and Harry, he is sentenced to a lengthy term of incarceration at the notorious Dartmoor Prison.

Some years later, Joe succeeds in escaping from the prison, and makes his way across the bleak Dartmoor landscape towards the isolated cottage where Sally and Harry, since married and with a young son, now live. At night he surprises Sally outside her home where she, now feeling remorseful about her role in his imprisonment, takes pity on him and offers him a hiding place. Harry returns, and there follows an awkward but genuine reconciliation between Harry and Joe, climaxing with Harry's decision to assist Joe's escape. However, on the point of escape, Joe abandons the enterprise and initiates a rush to the cottage that he knows will draw attention and lead to his death. The guards posted at the farm shoot him, and he dies in Sally's arms.

== Cast ==
- Norah Baring as Sally
- Uno Henning as Joe
- Hans Adalbert Schlettow as Harry

== Production ==
Dartmoor locations were used for exterior filming, while interior work was shot at Welwyn Studios near London. The three main actors were English (Baring), Swedish (Henning) and German (Schlettow). It was the only British film for Henning and Schlettow.

A Cottage on Dartmoor uses flashback technique, opening with Joe's flight from prison before going back to reveal the core events which led to him being there. The action finally returns to the present and Joe's death, framing the historical with the current.

The central cinema sequence in the film is noted for its reflection of the seminal transitional period in cinema history when the advent of talkies was revolutionising the industry but silent and talkie films still existed side by side. The first film on the bill at the cinema is a silent comedy, with full orchestral accompaniment, and the audience are shown laughing uproariously. When the main talkie feature begins, however, the audience falls into a state of stunned, emotionless silence. This has been interpreted as Asquith's own comment on the phenomenon.

Writing in The New York Times in 2007, critic Dave Kehr surmised that "many filmmakers, Asquith apparently included, believed that silent storytelling had reached such a high level of refinement that mere chatter would never be enough to extinguish it."

== Legacy ==
A Cottage on Dartmoor has yet to be released in its original part-talkie form. A mute version of the sound print was released without its original soundtrack on DVD by Kino Films in the US in 2007. In place of the original sound, a modern piano score has been added which bears no resemblance to the original synchronized score. The same DVD was released in the UK by the British Film Institute in 2008, and was positively received by critics. Simon McCallum wrote, "A straightforward but beautifully realised tale of sexual jealousy, the film easily counters the entrenched criticism that British cinema in the silent era was staid, stagy and lacking emotion" and "(it) is perhaps most rewardingly viewed as a final, passionate cry in defence of the silent aesthetic in British cinema." Kehr noted that the film "(suggests) that there was more to the British silent cinema than the youthful works of Alfred Hitchcock" and that it "provides ample illustration of how elegantly and assuredly expressive silent film had become, and how hard it must have been to believe that this magnificent medium, then just over 30 years old, was doomed."
