= General von Döbeln =

1942 film

- Directed by: Olof Molander
- Starring: Edvin Adolphson
- Release date: 26 October 1942
- Running time: 87 minutes
- Country: Sweden
- Language: Swedish

General von Döbeln is a 1942 Swedish historical drama film directed by Olof Molander. It is a biopic of Lieutenant General and war hero Georg Carl von Döbeln.

== Cast ==
- Edvin Adolphson as General von Döbeln
- Poul Reumert as Kronprins Karl Johan
- Eva Henning as Marianne Skjöldebrand
- Kolbjörn Knudsen as Major Canitz
- Uno Henning as Baron Anckarsvärd
- Ivar Kåge as General Sandels
- Rune Carlsten as Auditör Turdfjäll
- John Ekman as General Adlercreutz
- Åke Claesson as Prästen
