= La Genevraie =

- Part of Merlerault-le-Pin
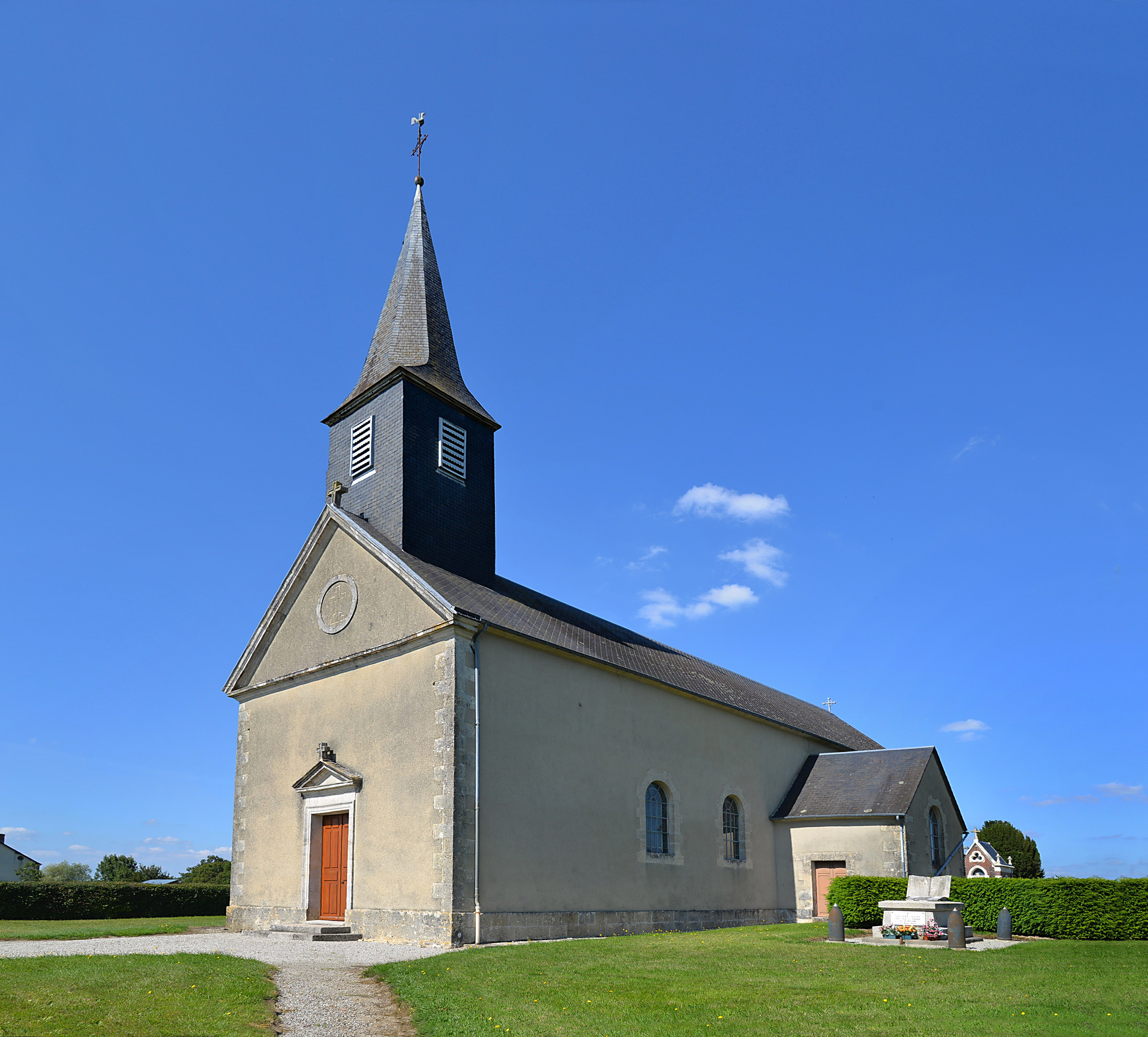
- The church in La Genevraie
- Location of La Genevraie
- Location within France Location within Normandy
- Coordinates: 48°41′07″N 0°19′08″E
- Country: France
- Region: Normandy
- Department: Orne
- Arrondissement: Mortagne-au-Perche
- Canton: Rai
- Commune: Merlerault-le-Pin
- Area^{1}: 13.37 km^{2} (5.16 sq mi)
- Highest elevation: 300 m (980 ft)
- Lowest elevation: 184 m (604 ft)
- Population (2022): 91
  - Density: 6.8/km^{2} (18/sq mi)
- Time zone: UTC+01:00 (CET)
  - Summer (DST): UTC+02:00 (CEST)
- Postal code: 61240
- ^{1} French Land Register data, which excludes lakes, ponds, glaciers > 1 km^{2} (0.386 sq mi or 247 acres) and river estuaries.

La Genevraie (French pronunciation: [la ʒənəvʁɛ]) is a former commune in the Orne department in north-western France. On 1 January 2025, it was merged into the new commune of Merlerault-le-Pin.

== Geography ==
The former Commune is within the Natura 2000 protected area of Bocages et vergers du sud Pays d'Auge.

The former commune is part of a 20,593 hectare, Natura 2000 conservation area, called the Haute vallée de l'Orne et affluents.

== See also ==
- Communes of the Orne department
