= Olof Molander =

Swedish director (1892–1966)

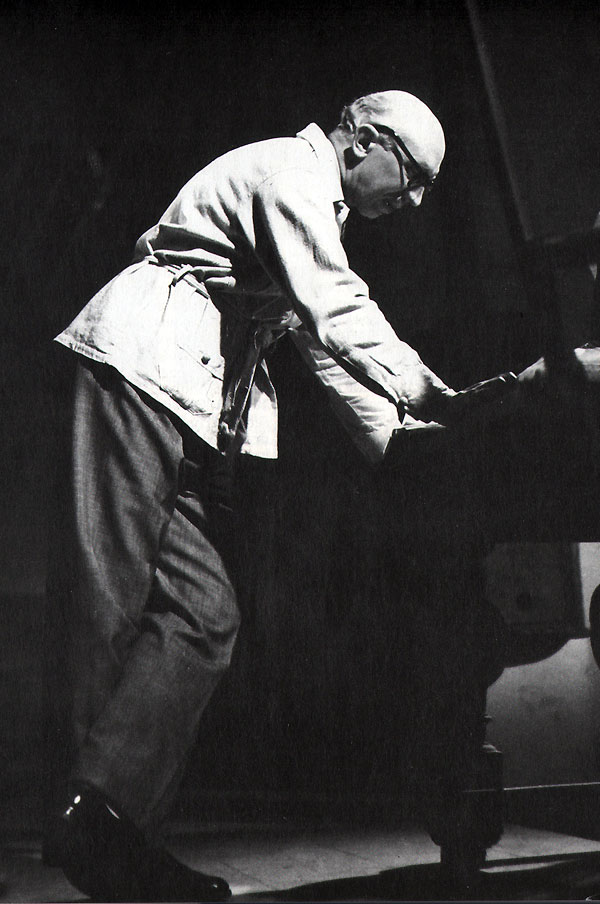

Olof Johan Harald Molander (8 October 1892 – 26 May 1966) was a Swedish theatre and film director. He was most notable for his many Strindberg and Shakespeare productions.

== Biography ==
Molander was born in Helsinki. He was the son of the director and writer John Harald Molander, Sr. (1858–1900) and actress Lydia Molander. His brother was the filmmaker Gustaf Molander. He was the uncle of the actor Jan Molander (1920–2009).

He entered the Royal Dramatic Training Academy in 1912. Molander was First Director of Sweden's Royal Dramatic Theatre from 1919 to 1963.

== Stage work ==
A complete list of Olof Molander's productions as director at the Royal Dramatic Theatre can be found here. (list and data from Dramaten.se).

== Selected filmography ==
- Thomas Graal's Ward (1922)
- The Lady of the Camellias (1925)
- Only a Dancing Girl (1926)
- Getting Married (1926)
- With Open Arms (1940)
- General von Döbeln (1942)
- Imprisoned Women (1943)
- I Killed (1943)
- Appassionata (1944)
- Oss tjuvar emellan eller En burk ananas (1945)
- The Gallows Man (1945)
- Johansson and Vestman (1946)
