= Uno Henning =

Swedish actor (1895–1970)

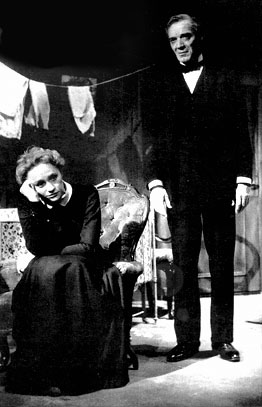
Uno Henning standing on stage with Gunn Wållgren in A Dream Play by August Strindberg. The Royal Dramatic Theatre, 1955.

Knut Uno Henning (11 September 1895, Stockholm – 16 May 1970) was a Swedish stage and film actor.

Henning's parents were Karl Bernhard Henning and Eleanor (Ellen) Martin. His father owned a bakery factory.

Henning studied at the Royal Swedish Dramatic Theatre School between 1915 and 1917. After graduating he performed at the Royal Dramatic Theatre, Stockholm, between 1918 and 1925 and returned there again between 1935 and 1965. Between 1929 and 1935 he was engaged by another Stockholm theatre, the Blanche Theatre. He made his film debut in 1919 in Rune Carlsten's A Dangerous Courtship and came to be involved in some 40 Swedish films and TV productions over his career. He had a leading role in the British silent era movie A Cottage on Dartmoor (1929).

In a memorable role, he played a cold and manipulative doctor in Hasse Ekman's film Take away (1948).

In 1925 he was chosen to recite the poem "Ring Out, Wild Bells" at midnight in the Skansen open air museum, a Swedish New Year's Eve national tradition.

He married Ragni Frisell (1896–1984) on 10 June 1926 in Stockholm. The actress Eva Henning is his step-daughter, Ragni Frisell's child by an earlier marriage to Edgar Wetlesen.

He died at 74 years old. Henning is buried in Norra begravningsplatsen in Stockholm.

== Selected filmography ==
- 1919: Ett farligt frieri
- 1925: The Lady of the Camellias
- 1926: Only a Dancing Girl
- 1926: Getting Married
- 1927: The Love of Jeanne Ney (German: Die Liebe der Jeanne Ney)
- 1929: A Cottage on Dartmoor
- 1942: General von Döbeln
- 1948: Each to His Own Way
- 1954: Foreign Intrigue (television series)
