= Tora Teje =

Swedish actress (1893–1970)

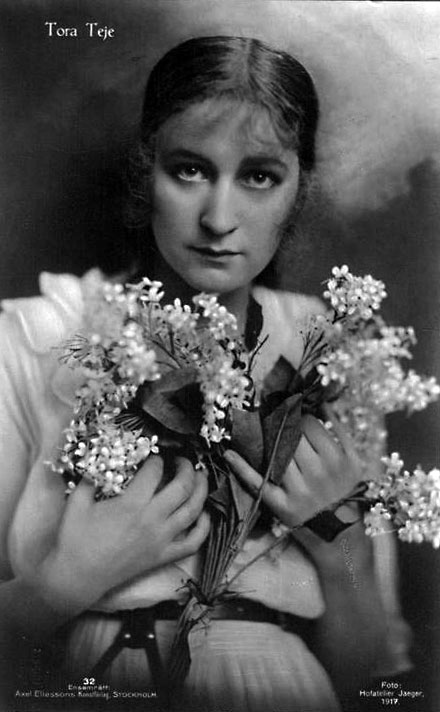
- Born: 17 January 1893; Stockholm, Sweden
- Died: 30 April 1970 (aged 77)
- Occupation: Actress
- Years active: c. 1910 – c. 1960

Tora Teje (17 January 1893 – 30 April 1970) was a Swedish theatre and silent film actress. She appeared in ten films between 1920 and 1939.

== Filmography ==
- Gubben kommer (1939)
- Getting Married (1926)
- The Lady of the Camellias (1925)
- 33.333 (1924)
- Norrtullsligan (1923)
- Häxan (1922)
- Familjens traditioner (1920)
- Erotikon (1920)
- Karin Ingmarsdotter (1920)
- Klostret i Sendomir (1920)
