= Marie Duplessis =

19th-century French courtesan

Marie Duplessis Comtesse de Perregaux
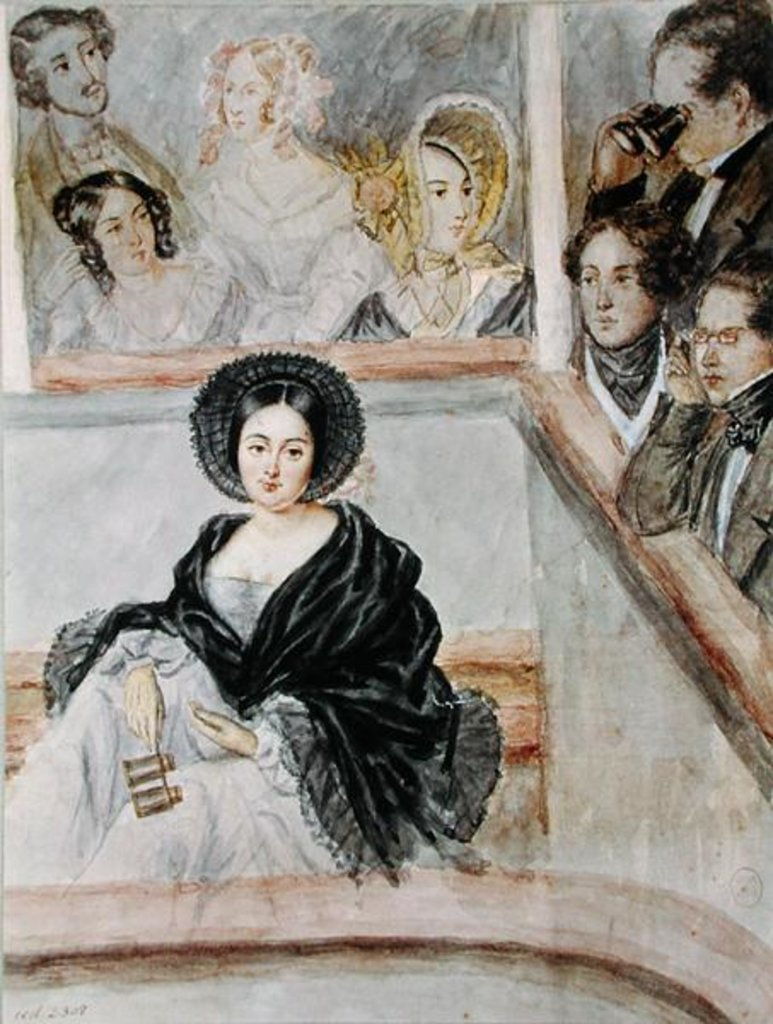
- Watercolour of Marie Duplessis at the theatre, by Camille Roqueplan
- Born: Alphonsine Rose Plessis; 15 January 1824; Nonant-le-Pin, Normandy, France
- Died: 3 February 1847 (aged 23); Paris, France
- Resting place: Montmartre Cemetery, Paris
- Occupation: Courtesan

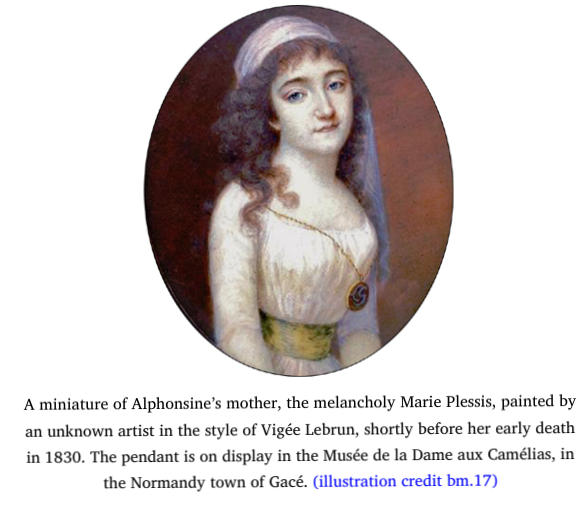
Marie Plessis, Mother of Marie Duplessis

Marie Duplessis (born Alphonsine Rose Plessis; 15 January 1824 – 3 February 1847) was a French courtesan and mistress to a number of prominent and wealthy men. She was the inspiration for Marguerite Gautier, the main character of the 1848 novel La Dame aux Camélias by Alexandre Dumas fils, one of Duplessis's lovers. Much of what is known about her has been derived from the literary persona and contemporary legends.

== Early life ==
Marie Duplessis was born Alphonsine Rose Plessis in 1824 to Marin Plessis and Marie Plessis (née Deshayes) at Nonant-le-Pin, Normandy, France. At the age of 15, she moved to Paris, where she found work in a dress shop.

As recorded in art of the day Marie Duplessis was evidently an extremely attractive young woman, with a petite figure and an enchanting smile. By the time she was 16, she had become aware that prominent men were willing to give her money in exchange for her company in both private and social settings. She became a courtesan and learned to read and write, and to stay abreast of world events so as to be able to converse on these topics with her clients and at social functions. She also added the faux noble "Du" to her name.

== Life as a courtesan ==
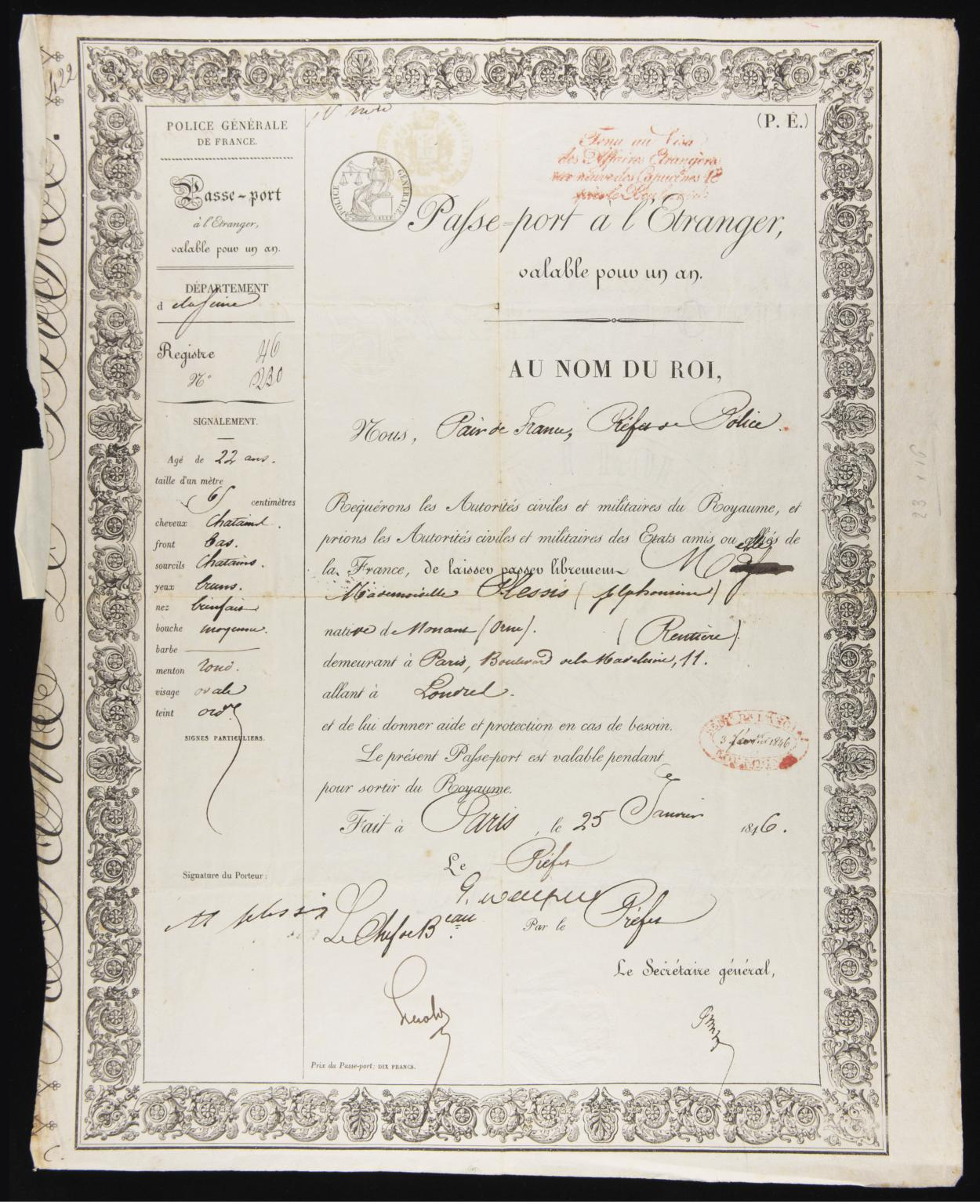
Passport issued to Alphonsine Plessis, January 1846

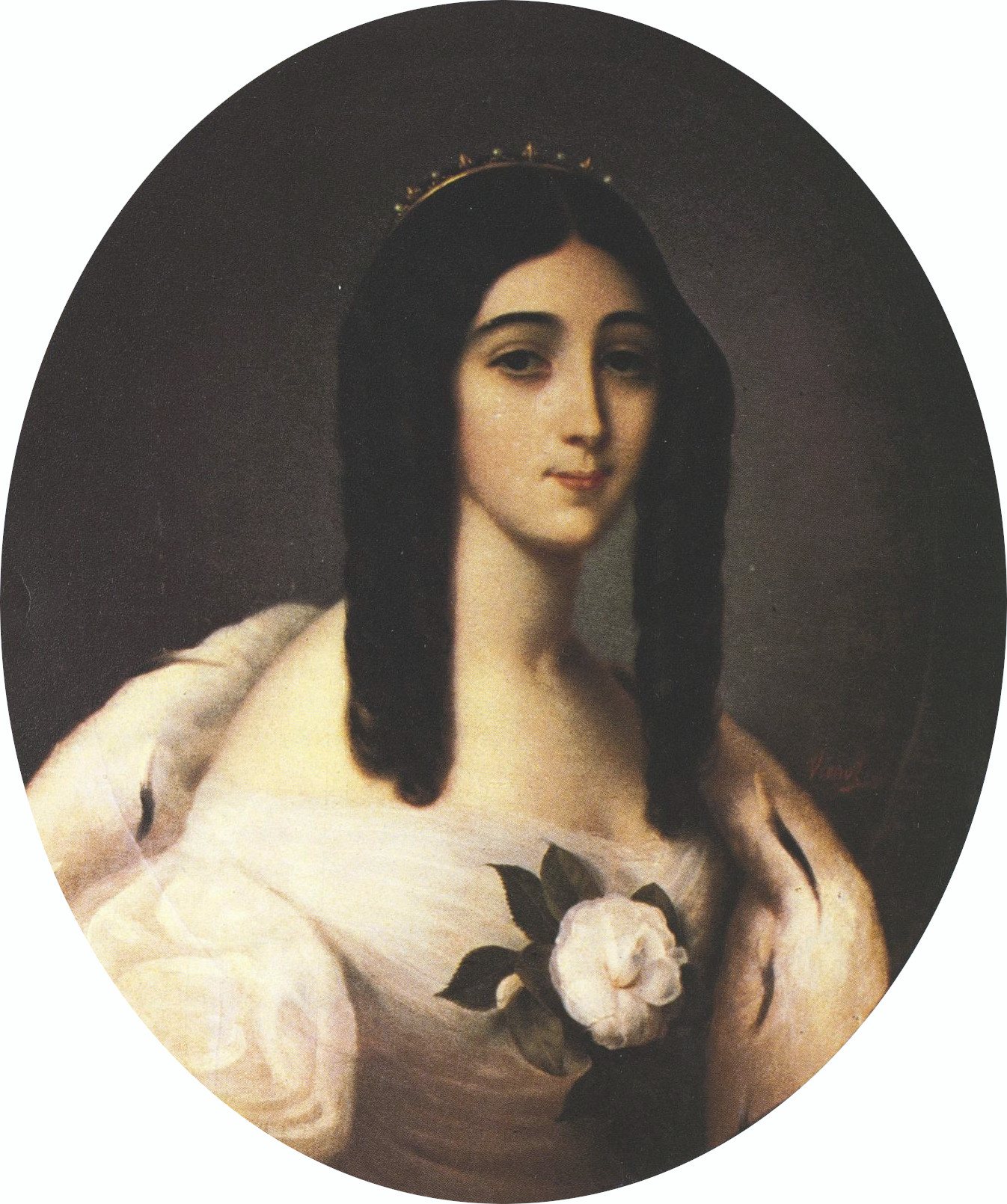
Marie Duplessis, painted by Édouard Viénot

Duplessis was both a popular courtesan and the hostess of a salon, where politicians, writers, and artists gathered for stimulating conversation and socializing. She rode in the Bois de Boulogne and attended opera performances. She also had her portrait painted by Édouard Viénot.

Duplessis was the mistress of Alexandre Dumas fils from September 1844 to August 1845. Afterward, she is believed to have become the mistress of composer Franz Liszt, who reportedly wished to live with her. In her short life, she gained a reputation as a discreet, intelligent, and witty lover. She remained in the good graces of many of her benefactors even after her relationships with them had ended.

In the summer of 1844, Plessis found her last great patron, the 78-year-old Count Gustav von Stackelberg (1766-1850). He was personally extremely wealthy and received a pension from the Tsar. Plessis and Stackelberg are said to have met at the spa resort of Bagnères-de-Luchon. She agreed to a liaison and he furnished her a magnificent six-room apartment on Boulevard de la Madeleine in Paris.

She was briefly married to at least one of her lovers: Count Édouard de Perregaux (1815-1889), a French nobleman and army officer.

== Death ==
Marie Duplessis died of tuberculosis at the age of 23 on 3 February 1847. Her husband, the Comte de Perregaux, and her former lover, the Baltic-German count Gustav Ernst von Stackelberg, were by her side. Within a few weeks of her death, her belongings were auctioned off to pay her debts.

Her funeral in Montmartre Cemetery in Paris was attended by hundreds of people. Her tomb can be visited at the Montmartre cemetery.

== Novel, play, and opera ==
Dumas's 1848 romantic novel The Lady of the Camellias was based on Duplessis. It appeared within a year of her death. In the book, Dumas became Armand Duval, and Duplessis became Marguerite Gautier. Dumas also adapted his story as a 1852 play, which inspired Giuseppe Verdi's 1853 opera La traviata and various films.

Duplessis is a major character in Sacha Guitry's play Debarau.

The journalist Romain Vienne was a childhood friend of hers and wrote La Vérité sur la dame aux camélias to correct some of the fictions that had grown up around her.
