= Charles Paul Landon =

French painter (1760–1826)

- Born: Charles Paul Landon; 12 October 1760; Nonant-le-Pin, France
- Died: 5 March 1826 (aged 65); Paris, France
- Occupations: painter, art historian

Charles Paul Landon (French pronunciation: [ʃaʁl pɔl lɑ̃dɔ̃]; 12 October 1760 – 5 March 1826) was a French painter and popular writer on art and artists.

== Life and work ==
Landon was born in Nonant-le-Pin and entered the studio of Jean-Baptiste Regnault, where he made a lifelong friendship with Robert Lefèvre. He and won the first prize of the academy in 1792, for study at the French Academy in Rome, where he stayed for five years. After his return from Italy, in the disturbed patronage conditions of the French Revolution, he seems to have abandoned painting and turned to writing, although he began to exhibit in 1795, and continued to do so at various intervals up to 1814. He exhibited three pictures at the Louvre: the Mother's Lesson, the Bath of Paul and Virginia and Daedalus and Icarus. A portrait from this period was purchased in 2003 for the Museum of Grenoble.

His Leda won an award of merit in 1801, and is in the château de Fontainebleau (deposited by the Louvre in 1932). His Mother's Lesson was the subject of a popular engraving. Paul and Virginia Bathing (an illustration of Bernardin de Saint-Pierre's popular novel, also engraved), his Sleep of Achilles and Daedalus and Icarus (1799, illustrated right) are all at the Musée des Beaux-Arts et de la Dentelle, Alençon.

It is chiefly for his writing on the arts that he made a reputation, however. He published nearly one hundred volumes during his lifetime. Landon was among the collaborators of the influential Journal des arts, des sciences et de la littérature. He was also a part-owner of the Gazette de France, where the extended accounts of annual Paris Salons were published. He was a paintings conservator at the Louvre, a corresponding member of the Institut and painter to Charles Ferdinand, duc de Berry, whose widow's paintings gallery he catalogued.

His major, on-going work comprised the Annales du musée et de l'école moderne des beaux-arts, published between 1808 and 1835 and running to 33 volumes. It forms a comprehensive resource on European art and artists prior to the 19th century. However it is far from perfect. The work has been criticised for containing many careless biographical mistakes and lacking critical accuracy.

An example of his popular works that has been recently reprinted was Numismatique du voyage du jeune Anacharsis, ou Médailles des beaux temps de la Grèce which was accompanied by an essay on connoisseurship of medals by Théophile Marion Dumersan and dedicated to Louis XVIII, 1823. Anacharsis had recently been established in the popular imagination in a historical novel, while coins were among the few antiquities that the middle class might aspire to own.

Landon also published

- Vie et œuvres des peintres les plus célèbres de toutes les écoles... ("Lives of Celebrated Painters"), in 22 volumes
- An Historical Description of Paris, 2 volumes
- Description of London, with 42 plates

He also produced descriptions of the Palais du Luxembourg and its contents, of the Giustiniani collection.

Landon died at Paris in 1826.

== Gallery ==
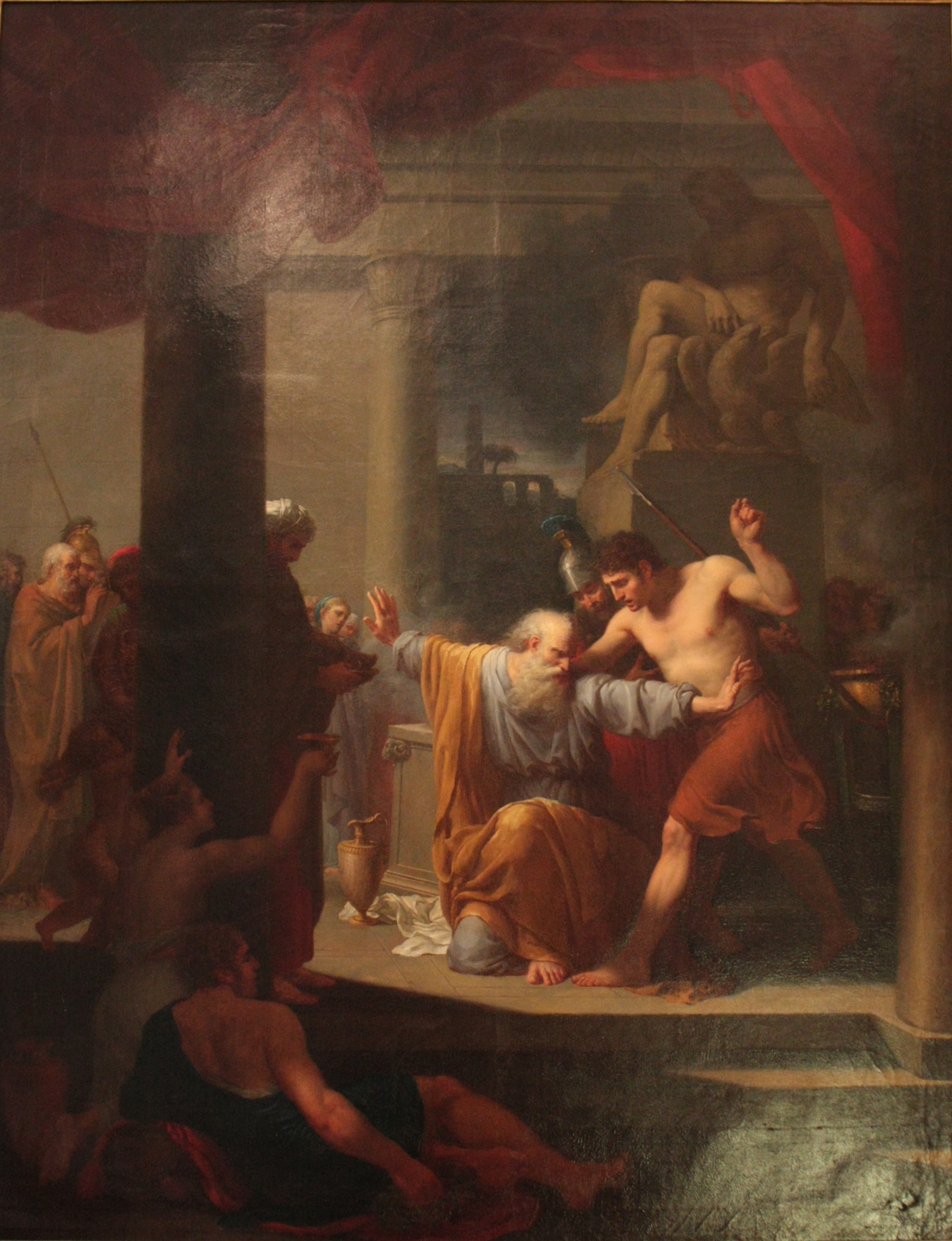
Eléazar (1792)

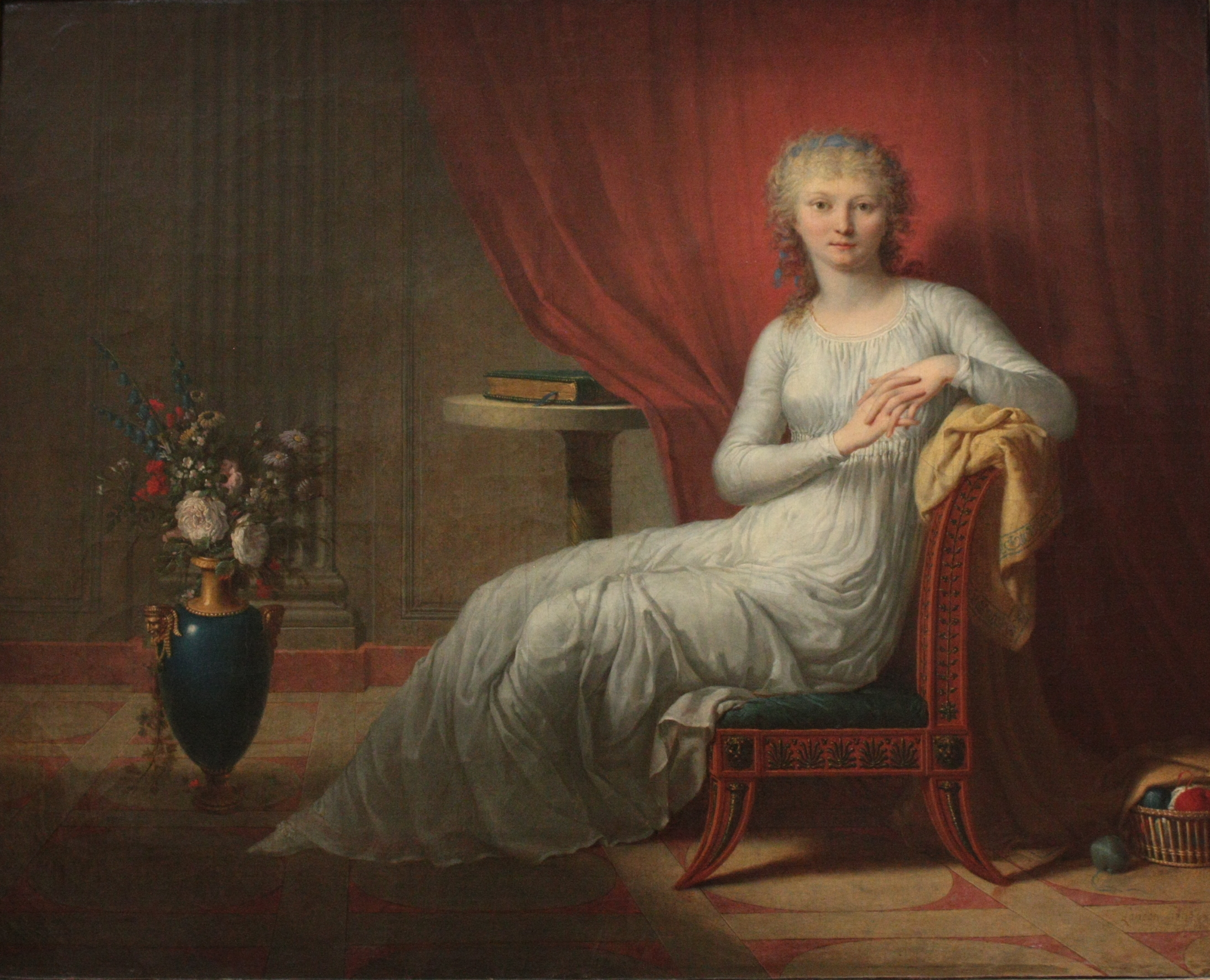
Portrait de femme (1793)

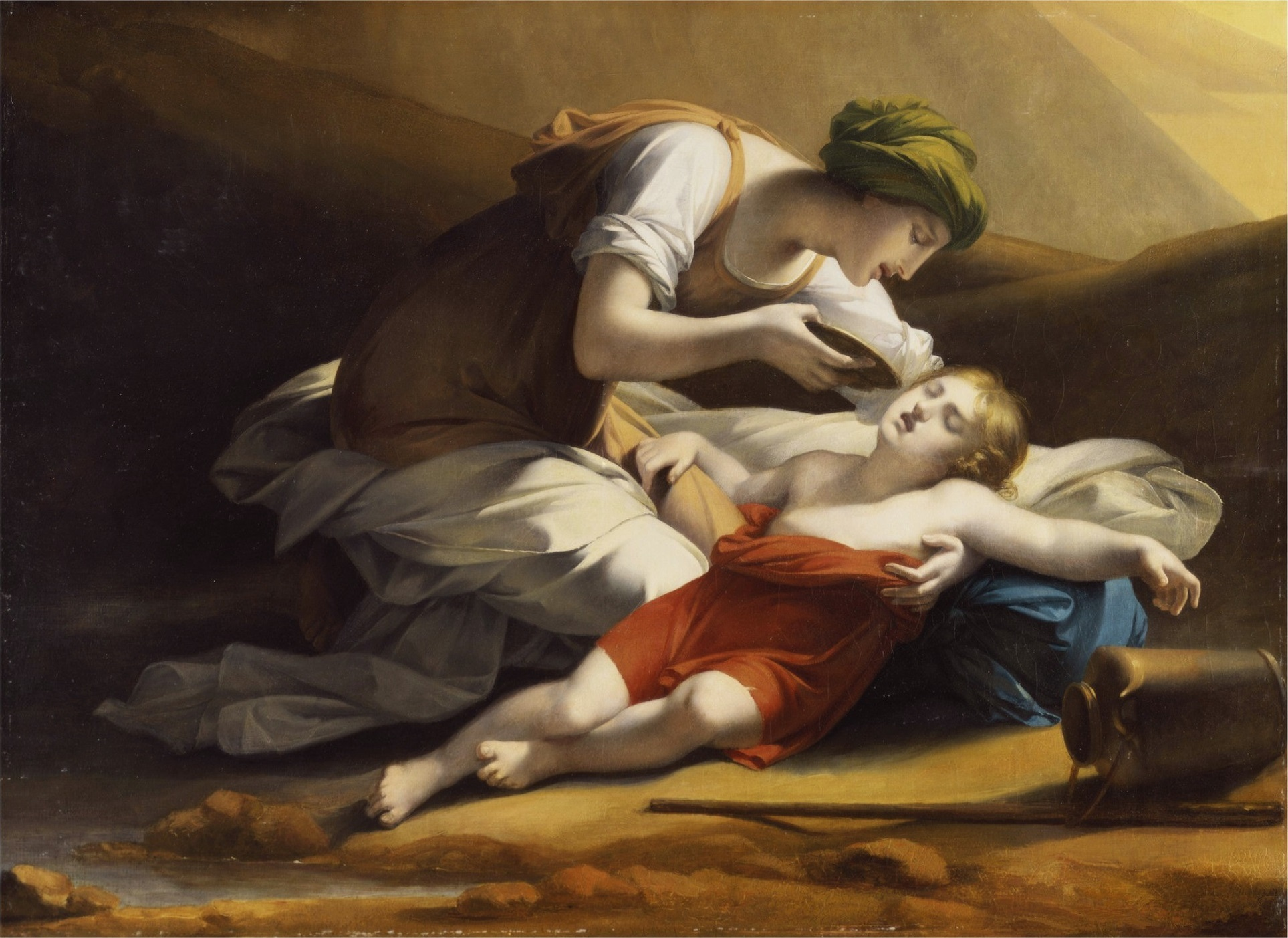
Hagar Giving Ishmael Water From the Miraculous Well in the Desert

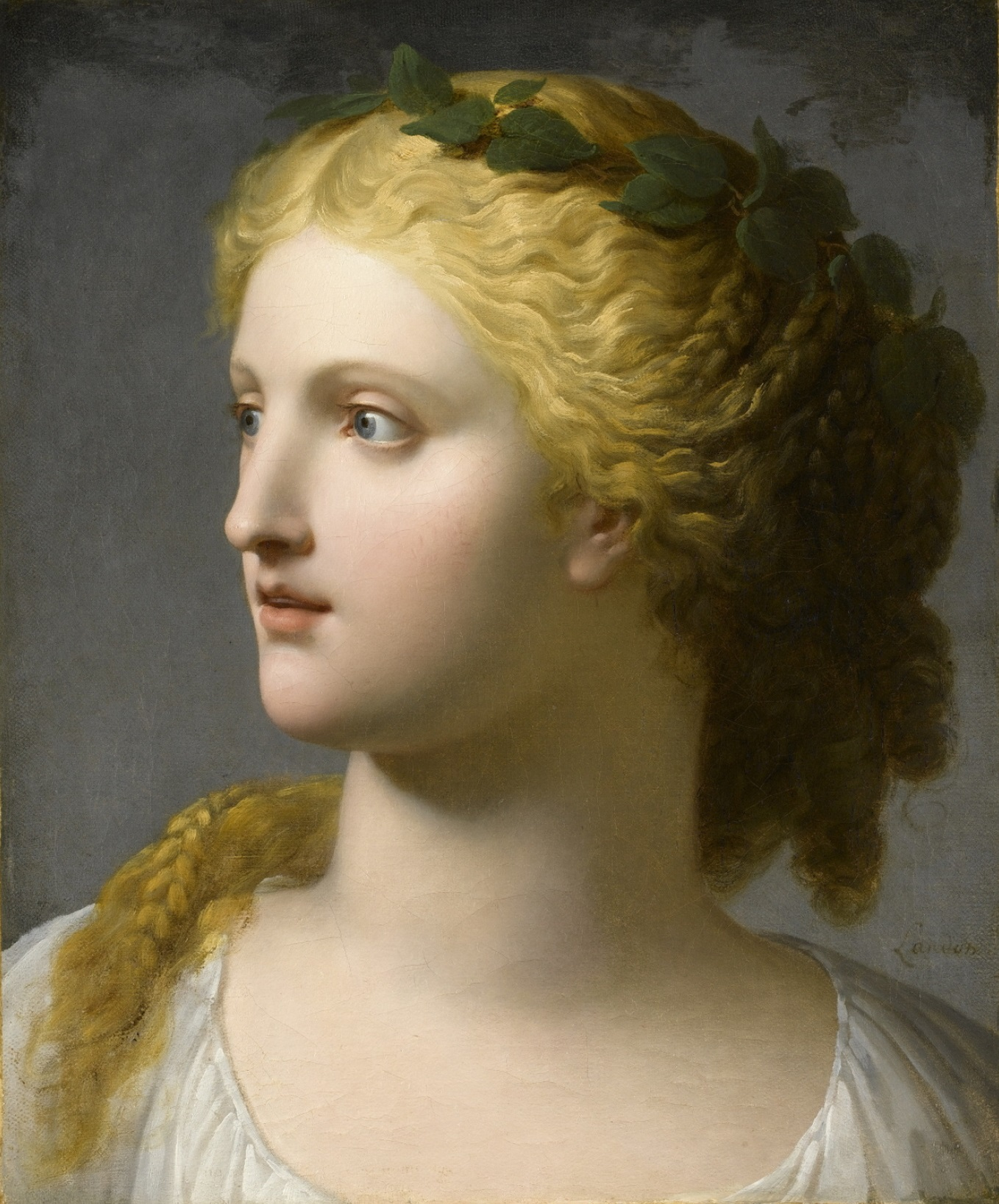
Tête de femme couronnée de laurier

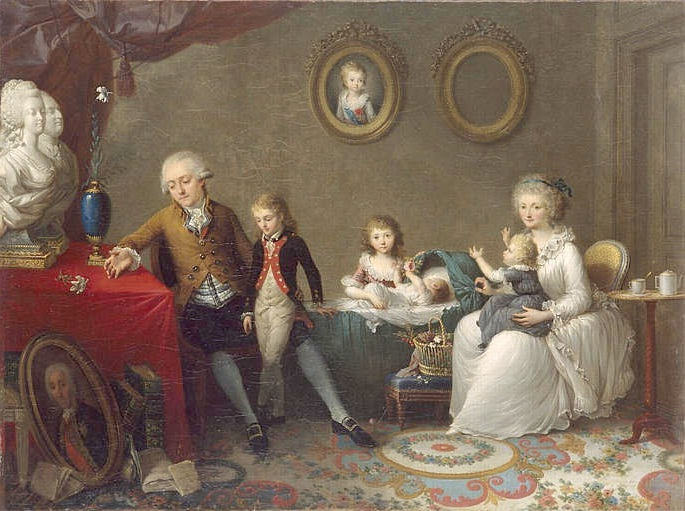
Le Comte Pierre-Jean de Bourcet et sa famille (1791)
