= Flers, Orne =

Commune in Orne, France

Flers
- Commune
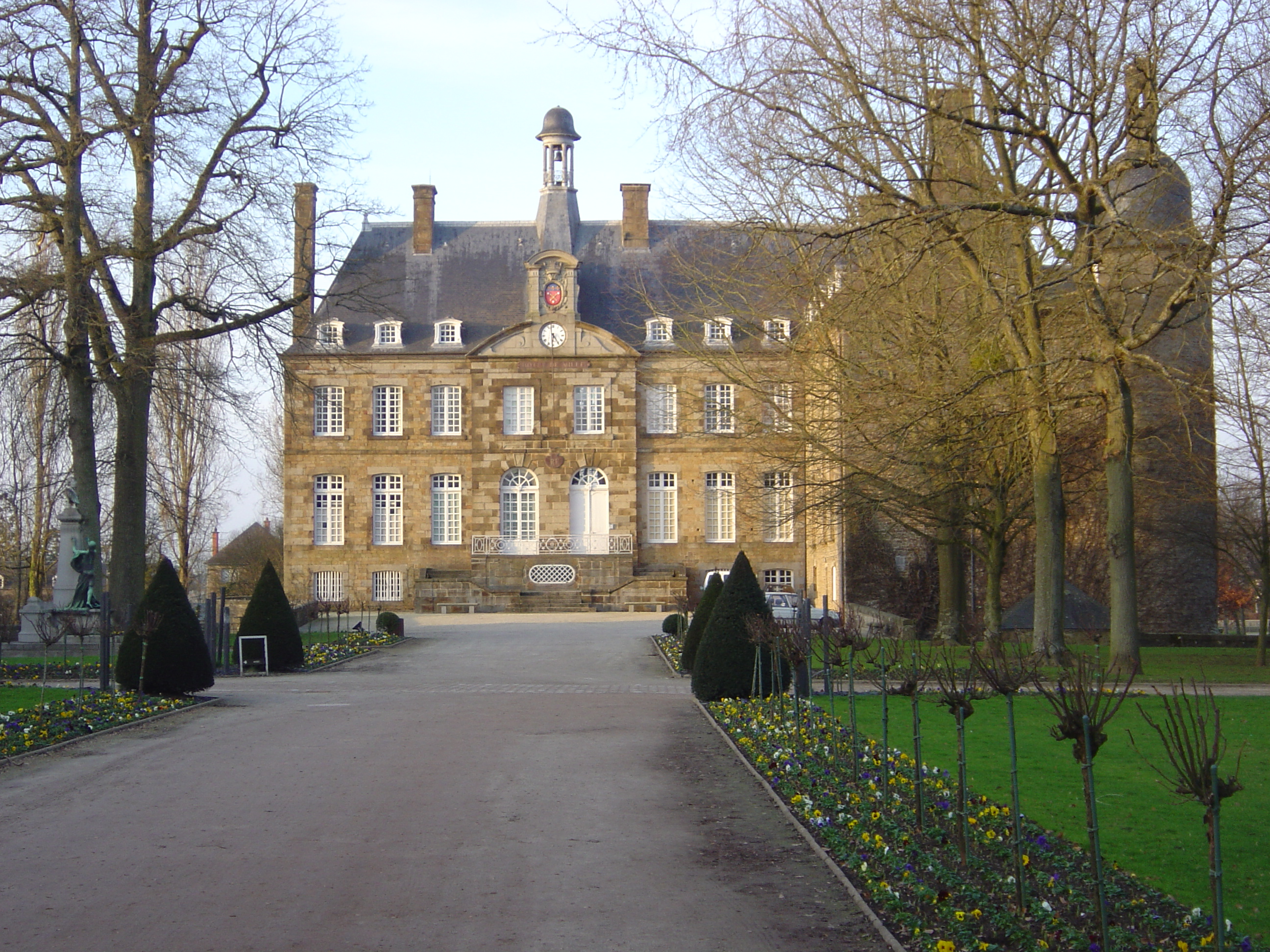
- Château de Flers

- Coat of arms
- Location of Flers
- Location within France Location within Normandy
- Coordinates: 48°45′06″N 0°33′38″W
- Country: France
- Region: Normandy
- Department: Orne
- Arrondissement: Argentan
- Canton: Flers-1 and 2
- Intercommunality: CA Flers Agglo

Government
  - Mayor (2020–2026): Yves Goasdoué
- Area^{1}: 21.15 km^{2} (8.17 sq mi)
- Elevation: 189 m (620 ft)
- Highest elevation: 276 m (906 ft)
- Lowest elevation: 182 m (597 ft)
- Population (2023): 14,432
  - Density: 682.4/km^{2} (1,767/sq mi)
- Time zone: UTC+01:00 (CET)
  - Summer (DST): UTC+02:00 (CEST)
- INSEE/Postal code: 61169 /61100
- Website: www.flers-agglo.fr
- ^{1} French Land Register data, which excludes lakes, ponds, glaciers > 1 km^{2} (0.386 sq mi or 247 acres) and river estuaries.

Flers (French pronunciation: [flɛʁ]) is a commune in the Orne department in Normandy, France. The inhabitants are called Flériens in French.

== History ==
The first written mentions of Flers appear at the end of the twelfth century as Flers (1164–1179) or Flex (1188–1221). Some authors think that the name of the town derives from the German toponym Hlaeri, meaning wasteland or common grazing land, while others suggest an origin in the German Fliessen, from the Dutch vliet or the Latin fluere Latin Fluere, indicating a waterflow, basin or marsh. Yet another etymology links Flers to the Latin flexus, meaning the bend in a road or river. Finally, the Breton term fler or flear means bad smell, indicating the stench of stagnant water. All etymologies seem to agree however that the town is named for its topography and the water close to it.

=== Middle Ages ===
From the tenth century on, the de Flers family headed a barony. Tradition has it that in the 11th century, the two brothers Foulques d'Aunou and Guillaume de Gasprée married two sisters who were Ladies of Flers. Foulques d'Aunou received as his wedding gift Flers, seat of the barony.

The construction of the castle of Flers began in the 12th century as a fortified location of wood and stone surrounded by water. The chronicles of the Hundred Years War do not mention a fortified place in Flers, revealing that it didn't present a major strategic interest at the time.

=== Construction of the castle ===
In 1790, in the revolutionary period, Flers formed a canton in the district of Domfront, in the Orne département. The countess of Flers, Jacqueline Le Goué de Richemont, wife of Pierre-François de Paule de La Motte-Ango, supported the counter-revolutionary chouans. The castle of Flers became the headquarters of count Louis de Frotté, one of the leaders of the Normandic Chouannerie.

=== Industrial Revolution ===
In 1901, Julien Salles, mayor of Flers, bought the castle for the community.

=== World War II ===
Like other towns near the D-Day landing, Flers was one of the targets of strategic bombing of Normandy on 6 and 7 June 1944, aimed at reducing the advance of German reinforcements. 80% of the town was destroyed. What remained of the town was liberated on 16 August by the British 11th Armoured Division and the memorial to the division is at Pont de Vère, north of Flers.

=== Heraldry ===
Arms of Flers	The arms of Flers are blazoned : Gules, 2 shuttles in saltire Or, between 3 bobbins argent, a chief of France (Azure, 3 fleurs de lys Or.

== Geography ==
The commune is made up of the following collection of villages and hamlets, Le Filtroquet, Le Buisson Corblin, Flers, Les Hautes Folletières, La Géroudière, La Blanchardière, Les Closets, La Béguinière and Le Caillou.

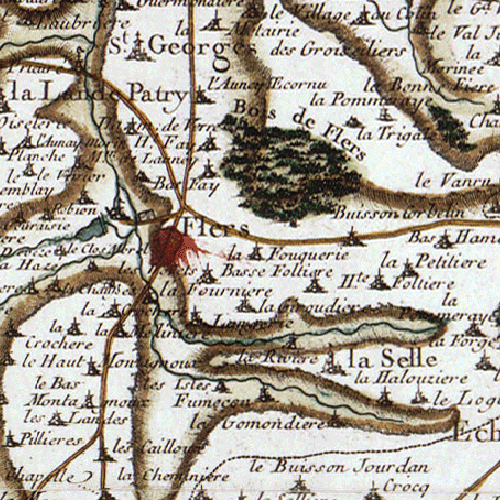
Flers on the 18th century Cassini map

Flers is bordered to the north by the communes of Saint-Georges-des-Groseillers and Aubusson, to the north-east by Athis-Val de Rouvre, to the west by La Lande-Patry and Saint-Paul, to the south-west by La Chapelle-Biche, La Chapelle-au-Moine and Messei, and to the south-east by La Selle-la-Forge. The commune is on the border of the area known as Suisse Normande.

The commune is situated in the north-west of the Orne département, about ten kilometres from the border of the Calvados, an hour east of Granville, and two hours by train from Paris. It depends on a prefecture located an hour north in Caen.

The commune is spread over an area of 21.15 square kilometres (5,230 acres) with a maximum altitude of 276 metres (905 ft 6 in) and minimum of 182 metres (597 ft 1 in)

The commune is crossed by a river, La Vere, which ends in the river Noireau in Pont-Erembourg (commune of Saint-Denis-de-Méré). In addition another river Le Hariel and a stream La Gomondiere flow through the commune.

=== Climate ===
Flers is part of the region that stretches from the Bocage to the Écouves forest, the wettest part of the Orne département, with relatively mild temperatures thanks to its proximity to the English Channel and the effect of the sea. It benefits from an oceanic climate with mild winters and temperate summers.

Climate data for Flers/Athis-Val de Rouvre (1991–2012 normals, extremes 1968–2012)
Month	Jan	Feb	Mar	Apr	May	Jun	Jul	Aug	Sep	Oct	Nov	Dec	Year
Record high °C (°F)	15.0 (59.0)	20.0 (68.0)	24.0 (75.2)	27.9 (82.2)	31.1 (88.0)	35.4 (95.7)	36.0 (96.8)	39.2 (102.6)	33.5 (92.3)	29.5 (85.1)	19.7 (67.5)	15.6 (60.1)	39.2 (102.6)
Mean daily maximum °C (°F)	7.3 (45.1)	8.6 (47.5)	11.9 (53.4)	14.7 (58.5)	18.4 (65.1)	21.4 (70.5)	23.4 (74.1)	23.7 (74.7)	20.3 (68.5)	15.7 (60.3)	11.0 (51.8)	7.5 (45.5)	15.3 (59.5)
Daily mean °C (°F)	4.3 (39.7)	4.9 (40.8)	7.2 (45.0)	9.3 (48.7)	12.8 (55.0)	15.6 (60.1)	17.4 (63.3)	17.6 (63.7)	14.6 (58.3)	11.3 (52.3)	7.4 (45.3)	4.4 (39.9)	10.6 (51.1)
Mean daily minimum °C (°F)	1.3 (34.3)	1.1 (34.0)	2.6 (36.7)	3.9 (39.0)	7.2 (45.0)	9.8 (49.6)	11.5 (52.7)	11.5 (52.7)	8.9 (48.0)	7.0 (44.6)	3.9 (39.0)	1.4 (34.5)	5.8 (42.4)
Record low °C (°F)	−22.6 (−8.7)	−15.0 (5.0)	−12.0 (10.4)	−6.0 (21.2)	−4.7 (23.5)	0.2 (32.4)	2.5 (36.5)	1.6 (34.9)	−1.5 (29.3)	−6.8 (19.8)	−9.3 (15.3)	−12.5 (9.5)	−22.6 (−8.7)
Average precipitation mm (inches)	98.9 (3.89)	75.4 (2.97)	65.1 (2.56)	65.4 (2.57)	73.1 (2.88)	61.2 (2.41)	60.6 (2.39)	69.1 (2.72)	69.0 (2.72)	96.5 (3.80)	97.5 (3.84)	112.9 (4.44)	944.7 (37.19)
Average precipitation days (≥ 1.0 mm)	14.3	12.6	11.7	11.3	10.4	8.6	8.8	9.5	9.9	13.5	14.7	15.4	140.9
Source: Meteociel

=== Land distribution ===
The 2018 CORINE Land Cover assessment shows, 33% (495 hectares (1,220 acres)) of the land is Grasslands and with 25% being urbanised. The rest of the land is Heterogeneous agricultural land at 18%, Arable land at 16%, 8% is industrial or Commercial and the remaining 1% (31 hectares (77 acres)) is artificial green space.

== Demographics ==
Historical population

Year	Pop.	±% p.a.
1793	2,603	—
1800	2,656	+0.29%
1806	2,821	+1.01%
1821	3,454	+1.36%
1831	4,386	+2.42%
1836	4,895	+2.22%
1841	6,113	+4.54%
1846	7,042	+2.87%
1851	8,461	+3.74%
1856	9,217	+1.73%
1861	10,054	+1.75%
1866	10,260	+0.41%
1872	10,678	+0.67%
1876	11,155	+1.10%
1881	12,304	+1.98%
1886	14,013	+2.64%
1891	13,860	−0.22%
1896	13,404	−0.67%
1901	13,680	+0.41%

Year	Pop.	±% p.a.
1906	13,704	+0.04%
1911	13,610	−0.14%
1921	12,812	−0.60%
1926	12,948	+0.21%
1931	13,022	+0.11%
1936	12,900	−0.19%
1946	12,336	−0.45%
1954	13,010	+0.67%
1962	14,634	+1.48%
1968	17,683	+3.20%
1975	20,486	+2.12%
1982	18,911	−1.14%
1990	17,888	−0.69%
1999	16,947	−0.60%
2007	15,808	−0.87%
2012	14,968	−1.09%
2017	14,734	−0.31%
2023	14,432	−0.34%

For the census from 1962 the official population corresponds with the population without duplicates
Source: EHESS and INSEE

== Transport ==
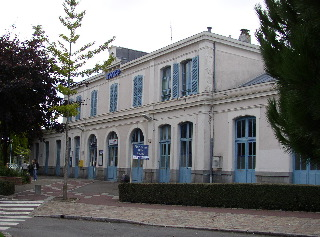
Train station of Flers-de-l'Orne

Flers station is served by TER Normandie trains between Paris and Granville. It has a local bus system for Flers and the surrounding communities, and departmental lines connecting it with other major towns in Orne and Calvados.

L'aérodrome Flers-Saint-Paul is an aerodrome bordering Flers in the neighbouring commune of La Lande-Patry that opened in 1937. Its ICAO airport code is LFOG. It has a 742-meter paved runway.

La boucle de l'Orne, a 120km tourist road route through Suisse Normande passes through Flers.

== Monuments and interesting places ==
The castle, dating back to the 16th and 18th century, houses a Museum of France dedicated to ancient and 19th century paintings and sculptures, applied art (furniture and decoration) and local history. The castle was registered as a Monument historique in 1907.

Flers has another building registered as a monument, the Chapel of Remembrance (Also known as the chapel of the minor seminary), which was built between from 1926 to 1932 to commemorate those fallen from the First World War. It features work by Prix de Rome winning artist, Emile Beaume and stained glass artist Louis Barillet. It was registered as a monument in 2006.

Other interesting visits are the early 20th century neo-gothic Saint-Germain church and the 19th century neo-Romanesque Saint-Jean church, and the covered market built in 1883 on a former cemetery.

=== Architecture contemporaine remarquable ===
The Commune has 2 buildings listed as being Architecture contemporaine remarquable

- Former public Shower baths - built in 1923 and designed by artitech Vicicale Eugène the public baths were in use until the early 1980s. In 2007 it was labelled as a Architecture contemporaine remarquable building. In 2014 the building was renovated by CA Flers Agglo to become a space for young entrepreneurs.
- La petite A - a building designed for the association of alumni of the secular schools of Flers to host parties in. It was built in 1932 and in 2007 it was awarded the Architecture contemporaine remarquable label.
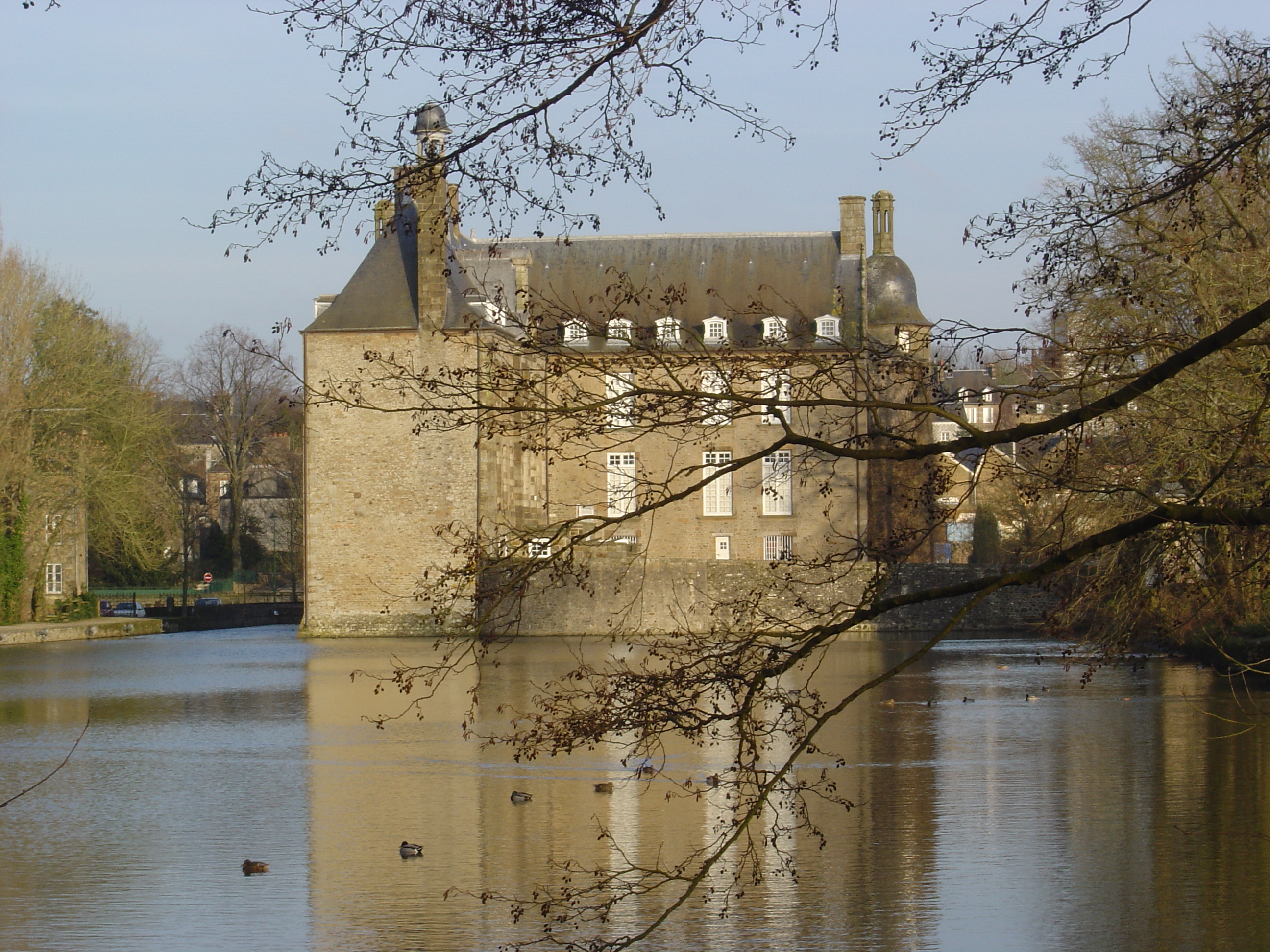
Flers castle

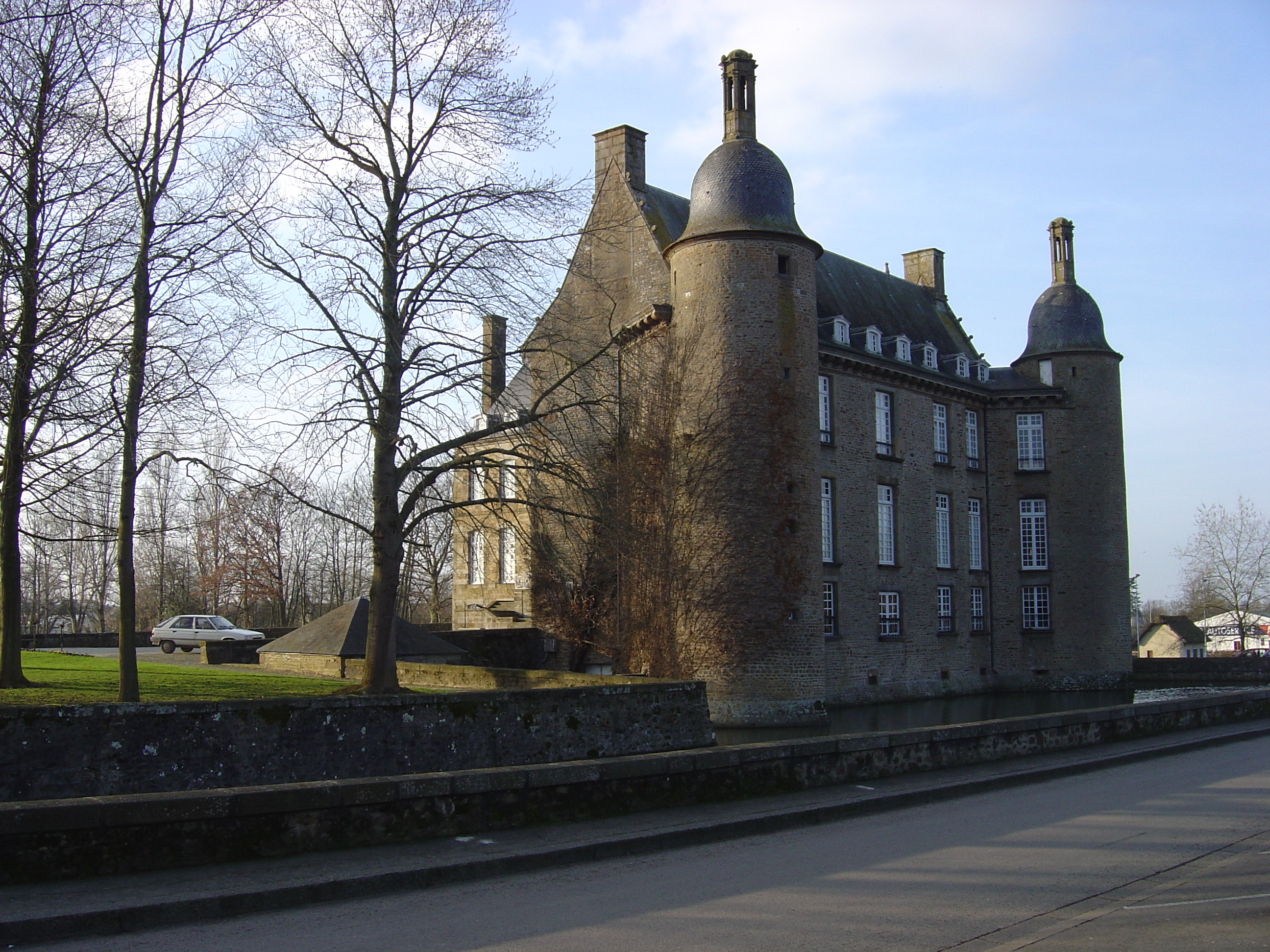
Flers castle

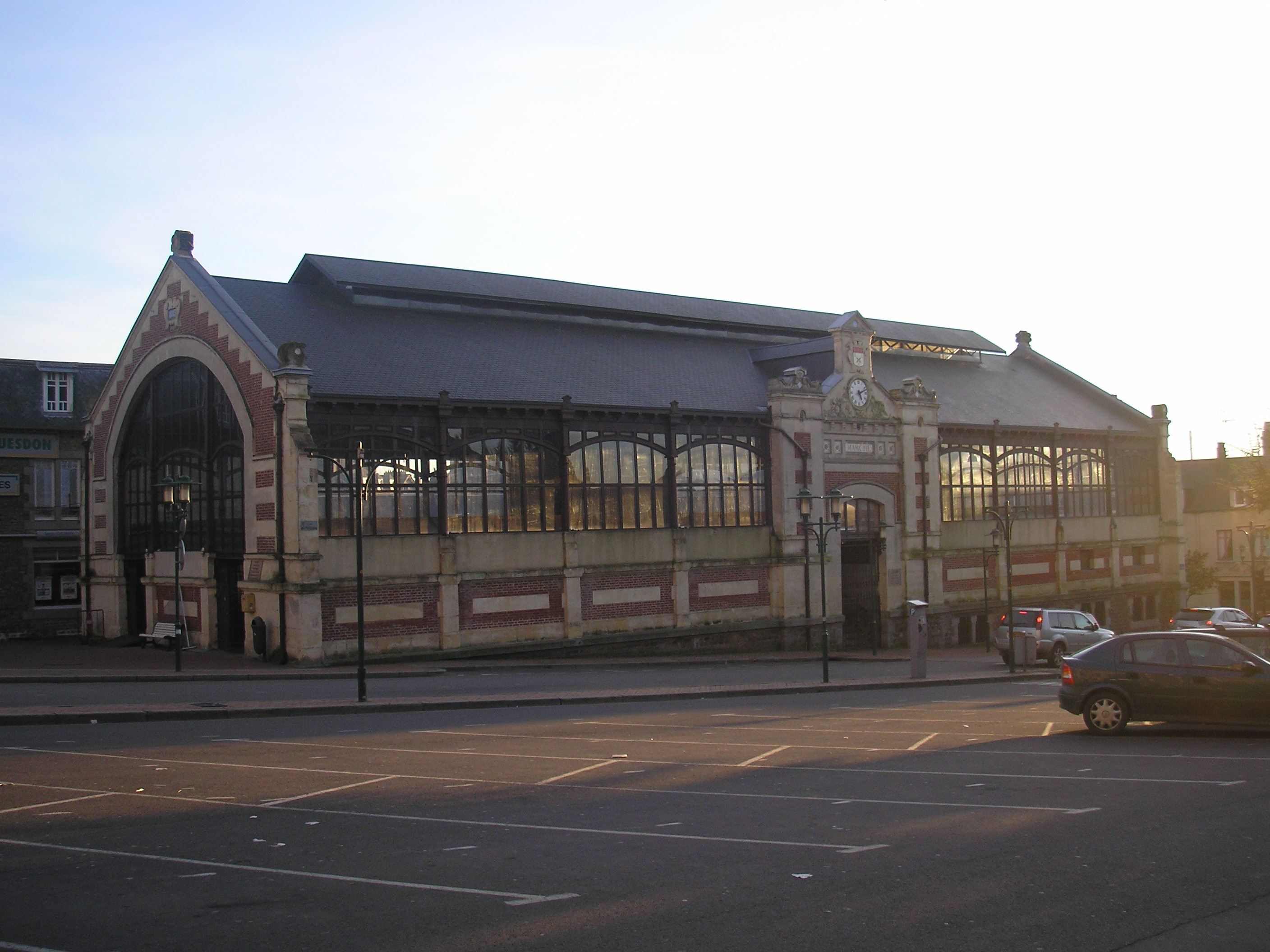
The covered market

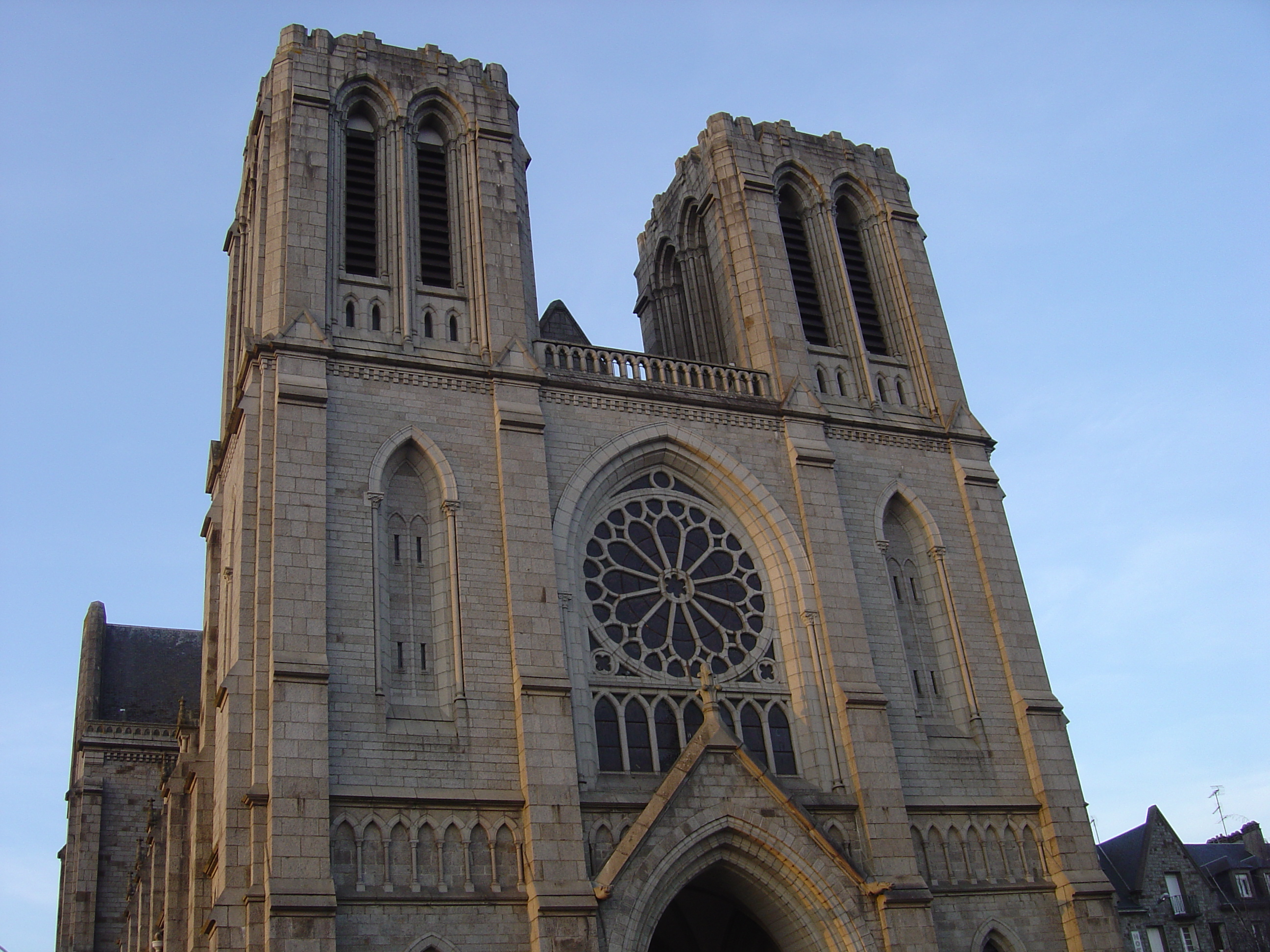
Saint-Germain church

== Sport ==
Flers has a football club Football Club Flérien who play at the Stade du Hazé.

The commune has a swimming pool the Centre Aquatique Capfl'O, which has been open since 2002. The pool, features both indoor and outdoor pools as well as sauna, steam room areas.

== Notable people ==
- Louis Barrabé (1895–1961), geologist, buried here
- Yves Goasdoué - (born 1959) a politician has been the mayor of Flers since 2001.

=== Born in Flers ===
- Aimé Dupond (1809 – 1872), a French Roman Catholic missionary and bishop
- Henri Brière (1873 -1957), politician
- Fernand Jourdant (1903 – 1956) a French fencer
- Guy Mollet (1905 - 1975), politician
- Paulette Duhalde (1921–1945), heroine of the resistance, died when deported to Ravensbrück
- Geoffroy Dauvergne (1922 - 1977) Painter, Sculptor and Mosaic artist
- Jean-Pierre Brard (1948), politician
- Gérard Larcher (1949), President of the Senate of France
- Jean-Claude Ruiz (1954 – 2021) a boxer.
- Patrice Lecornu (1958–2023), professional football (soccer) player
- Alain Lemercier (1957), racewalker
- Nelly Viennot (1962), football referee
- Tony Chapron (1972), international football (soccer) referee
- Romain Hardy (Born 1988), a professional cyclist.
- Thibault Moulin (1990), footballer who plays for Legia Warsaw
- Pierre-Henri Lecuisinier (1993) a professional cyclist.
- Valentin Gondouin a long-distance runner was born here.

== Twin towns ==
Flers is twinned with:

- Warminster, England, since 1973
- Poundou, Burkina Faso, since 1977
- Wunstorf, Germany, since 1994
- Charleston, South Carolina, United States, since 2022

== See also ==
- Communes of the Orne department
