= Paulette Duhalde =

French Resistance fighter

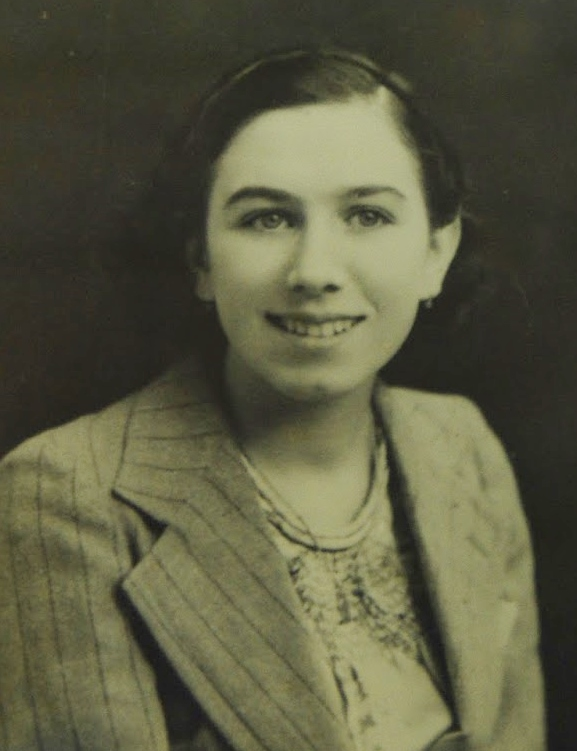
- Born: 23 July 1921; Flers, Normandy, France
- Died: 23 April 1945 (aged 23); Ravensbrück Concentration Camp, Germany
- Other name: Jojo
- Occupations: Member of the French Resistance (Jeanne Network) and Clerk, Banque de France (Flers)
- Parent: M. Edouard Duhalde
- Awards: Legion of Honor; Croix de Guerre 1939–1945 avec palms; Médaille de la Résistance

Paulette Duhalde (23 July 1921 – 23 April 1945) was a French Resistance fighter, who operated under the alias of "Jojo" with the Jeanne Network in France's Normandy region during World War II. Betrayed to the Gestapo by a spy within the network, she was arrested, tried, sentenced to five years in prison, and jailed at Fresnes before being deported to a prison facility in Aachen, Germany. Subsequently transferred to the prison at Cottbus near Leipzig, she was then transported, in 1944, to the Nazi concentration camp in Germany known as Ravensbrück. She died there on 23 April 1945.

Posthumously honored with multiple awards, including the Legion of Honor, her life is remembered in a small, permanent exhibit in the Hall of Deportation in the Musée du Château de Flers (Museum of the Castle of Flers) at Flers de l'Orne.

== Formative years ==
Born on 23 July 1921 in France's Normandy region in the community of Flers and baptized at the Roman Catholic church in St. Germain, Paulette Duhalde was the only child of M. Edouard Duhalde. Her mother operated a cafe in Flers. A "green-eyed brunette" who enjoyed spending time in the small garden of her family's Rue du Champ-de-Foire home, she reportedly read detective and espionage stories as a youth, and was an enthusiastic student of history and science at the Notre-Dame school in her community, who dreamed of becoming an aviator, but also later thought of following in the footsteps of St. Theresa of Lisieux. By the time she was a young adult, she had secured job as a clerk at the Banque de France de Flers. Forced to leave that job in 1940 when the bank downsized its staff in response to their town's occupation by German troops, she was able to return to her employment there after a two-year secretarial stint.

== World War II ==
By the end of November 1940, Paulette Duhalde had secured a new job as secretary to the industrialist Alphonse Warcin, a position she continued to hold through August 1942 when she was able to return to work as a clerk for the Bank of France. While employed with Warcin, she became one of the first French Resistance fighters in her community when she joined the Jeanne network in February 1941. Named for its manager, Robert Jeanne, a reserve officer with the French army air force, this network was involved in resistance activities that were designed to disrupt the operations of the Nazi Luftwaffe in France's Normandy region. While serving as the network liaison officer to National Commandant Rupied and Robert Esparre de Caen, she functioned as a courier under the alias "Jojo." Delivering resistance communications between Alençon, Caen, Paris, and Vire, she also observed and reported on the movement of German troops and equipment, and ultimately attained the rank of second lieutenant of the French Forces of the Interior, according to documents associated with the awards for valor which she would later receive from the French government.

During summer or autumn 1942, the Jeanne organization was infiltrated by a "mole," prompting its leaders to disband the network; their response came too late. Betrayed by that individual to the Geheime Staatspolizei (the Nazi Secret Police organization known more commonly as the "Gestapo"), multiple members of the former network were arrested in November 1942, including Robert Jeanne and Henri Brunet, who were captured on November 11, and Pierre Doucet, the Countess de Majo-Durezzo and Louis Esparre, who were found and arrested at Perpignan in December.

Paulette Duhalde (aka "Jojo") also became one of those hunted during that roundup. Questioned by the Gestapo on 9 December 1942 while she was at work at the Banque de France branch in Flers, she managed to covertly transfer a bag of compromising Resistance documents to a co-worker, Mrs. Vaubaillon, while Gestapo officers were interviewing other bank employees. The Gestapo officers then resumed their questioning of her, made the decision to arrest her, and jailed her at the prison at Fresnes on 12 December. Tried for espionage by a German Luftwaffe war council in Paris on 11 May, she was sentenced on 17 June 1943 to five years of "fortress" imprisonment. Initially returned to the prison at Fresnes, she was housed on the third floor in cell number 308, and assigned to kitchen and prison cleaning details during which she swept floors and washed laundry. Moved to the prison at Aachen on 8 July 1943, she was then deported on 22 July to the Cottbus prison near Leipzig, Germany.

On 21 November 1944 she was transported from Cottbus to the Ravensbrück concentration camp. A red triangle was affixed to her uniform, signifying her status as a political prisoner. Housed in overcrowded, unsanitary conditions where she was exposed to women suffering from a range of diseases, she became increasingly malnourished from the inadequate and poor quality of food provided. Her stamina was further weakened by work detail assignments on brutally hot or cold days during which she was required to unload wagons filled with the belongings of newly arriving prisoners, sort, and carry those items to their designated storage facilities. In January 1945, a typhus epidemic swept through the camp. Just weeks later, Paulette Duhalde became so ill with pneumonia that she was confined to her barracks. As her health deteriorated, her friends hid her from Nazi guards intent on finding candidates for removal to the camp's gas chambers. Briefly rallying, she forced herself to return to her work detail, but soon fell ill again, and was then confined with 150 other ailing women to Ravensbrück's Block 8. While there, she was required to share a cot with another woman. That woman, who survived her illness, later reported that Paulette Duhalde's health continued to steadily decline, despite the efforts of her friends to cheer her with news of approaching Russian troops. Ultimately so weak that she was unable to feed or wash herself, she died at Ravensbrück on 23 April 1945.

== Awards ==
Paulette Duhalde was posthumously honored with multiple awards, and her short life remembered via several public memorials:

- Legion of Honour;
- Croix de Guerre 1939-1945 avec palms (France); and
- Médaille de la Résistance.

In April 1945, her valor was honored with the placement of a plaque on the exterior of the Banque de France building in Flers; in 1966, the sculptor Petrus fashioned a likeness of her for a stele, which was displayed in the center square of Flers from 1999 until its relocation to a church in St. Germain. Her life also continues to be celebrated by a small, permanent exhibit in the Hall of Deportation in the Musée du Château de Flers (Museum of the Castle of Flers) at Flers de l'Orne.

== External resources ==
- Association Nationale des Anciens Combattants de la Banque de France (National Association of Veterans of the Banque of France). Paris, France.
- Holocaust Encyclopedia: Ravensbrück. Washington, D.C.: United States Holocaust Memorial Museum.
- Musée du Château de Flers (information regarding the Museum of the Castle of Flers). Normandy, France: Normandy Tourism Board.
