= Jean-Marie Landriève Des Bordes =

Commissary in New France

- Born: 12th of August 1712; Aubusson, France
- Died: May 1788; Artanes, France

Jean-Marie Landriève Des Bordes (12 August 1712, Aubusson - May 1788) was a commissary in New France where he as well performed various clerical jobs. He later died at his property in Artanes, France. He is most notable for being the namesake of the township of Landrienne, Canada.
