= Barrabé =

Barrabé is a surname. Notable people with the surname include:

- Claude Barrabé (born 1966), French footballer
- Louis Barrabé (1895–1961), French economic field geologist
