= La Lande-Patry =

- Commune
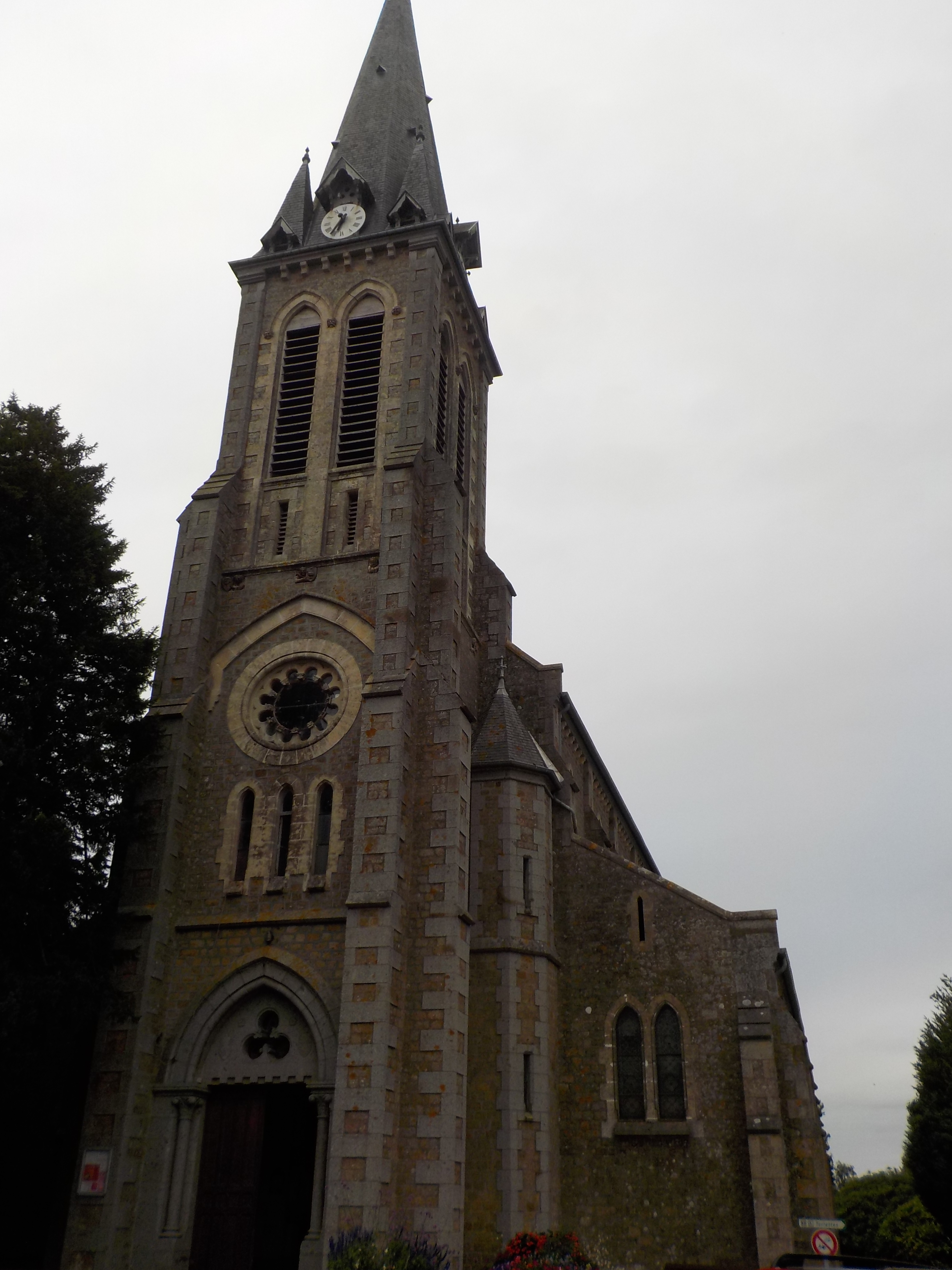
- The church in La Lande-Patry

- Coat of arms
- Location of La Lande-Patry
- Location within France Location within Normandy
- Coordinates: 48°45′49″N 0°35′50″W
- Country: France
- Region: Normandy
- Department: Orne
- Arrondissement: Argentan
- Canton: Flers-1
- Intercommunality: CA Flers Agglo

Government
  - Mayor (2020–2026): Pascal Lecerf
- Area^{1}: 6.60 km^{2} (2.55 sq mi)
- Highest elevation: 232 m (761 ft)
- Lowest elevation: 177 m (581 ft)
- Population (2023): 1,730
  - Density: 262/km^{2} (679/sq mi)
- Demonym: Landais
- Time zone: UTC+01:00 (CET)
  - Summer (DST): UTC+02:00 (CEST)
- INSEE/Postal code: 61218 /61100
- ^{1} French Land Register data, which excludes lakes, ponds, glaciers > 1 km^{2} (0.386 sq mi or 247 acres) and river estuaries.

La Lande-Patry (French pronunciation: [la lɑ̃d patʁi]) is a commune in the Orne department in north-western France. The commune is known for its Ifs millénaires (thousand year old yews), designated as an intangible cultural heritage in France.

== Geography ==
The commune is made up of the following collection of villages and hamlets, L'Oisellerie, La Lande-Patry, Le Vivier and Rebion.

Three rivers Vère, Le Hariel and La Visance flow through the commune. in addition a stream La Gomondiere also traverses the commune.

The commune is on the border of the area known as Suisse Normande.

== Transport ==
L'aérodrome Flers-Saint-Paul is an Aerodrome within the commune bordering Flers that opened in 1937. Its ICAO airport code is LFOG. It has a 742-meter paved runway.

== Notable people ==
Jean-Claude Decosse (Born 1949) is a racewalker who was born here.

== See also ==
- Communes of the Orne department
