= Aubusson =

Aubusson is the name or part of the name of several communes in France:

- Aubusson, Creuse, in the Creuse département, well known for the manufacture of Aubusson tapestry and carpets
- Aubusson, Orne, in the Orne département
- Aubusson-d'Auvergne, in the Puy-de-Dôme département
- Mitchell Aubusson (born 1987), Australian rugby league footballer
