= Jean-Claude Decosse =

French racewalker

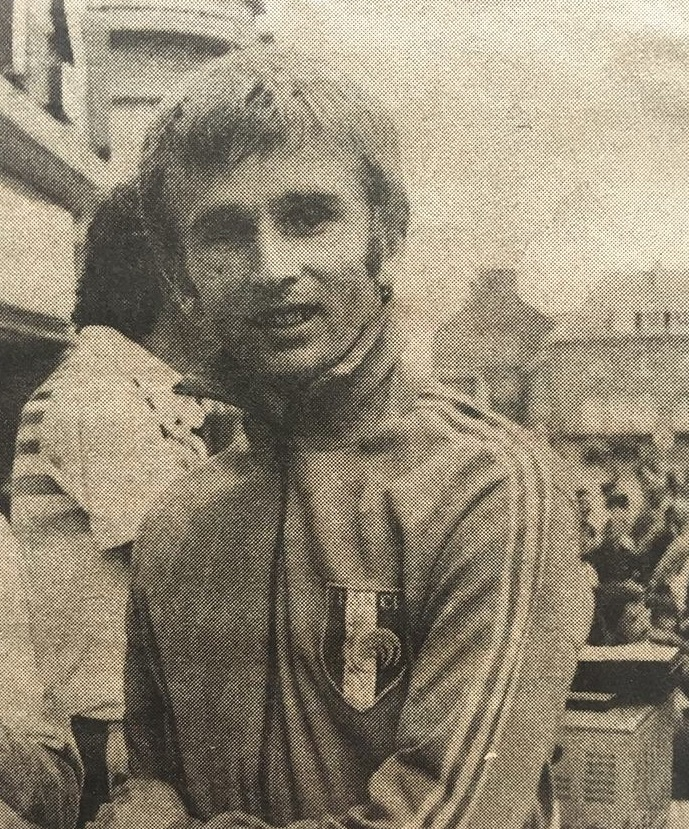
- Jean-Claude Decosse in 1969

Personal information
- Nationality: French
- Born: 6 July 1949 (age 77) La Lande-Patry

Sport
- Sport: Athletics
- Event: Racewalking

Jean-Claude Decosse (born 6 July 1949) is a French racewalker. He competed in the men's 50 kilometres walk at the 1972 Summer Olympics.
