= Canton of Flers-2 =

Coordinates: 48.75°N 0.56°W

The canton of Flers-2 is an administrative division of the Orne department, northwestern France. It was created at the French canton reorganisation which came into effect in March 2015. Its seat is in Flers.

It consists of the following communes:

1. Aubusson
2. Flers (partly)
3. Landigou
4. Montilly-sur-Noireau
5. Saint-Georges-des-Groseillers
6. Saint-Pierre-du-Regard
7. La Selle-la-Forge
