= Geoffroy Dauvergne =

French painter

- Born: Geoffroy Richard Jules Dauvergne; October 29 1922; Flers, Orne
- Died: January 23, 1977 (aged 54); Dinard
- Resting place: Cimetière marin du Rosais, Saint-Malo.
- Education: École régionale des beaux-arts de Rennes, Beaux-Arts de Paris & Casa de Velázquez
- Occupations: Painter, Sculptor and Mosaic artist
- Movement: School of Paris

Geoffroy Dauvergne (29 October 1922, Flers, Orne – 23 January 1977, Dinard) was a French painter. He died of accidental causes after falling from the rocks at Pointe du Décollé.
