= Henri Brière =

French politician

Member of the Chamber of Deputies
- In office 1928–1936

Personal details
- Born: 13 December 1873 Flers, France
- Died: 25 March 1957 (aged 83) Oran, French Algeria
- Party: Democratic Republican Alliance

Henri Brière (13 December 1873 - 25 March 1957) was a French politician. He represented the Democratic Republican Alliance in the Chamber of Deputies from 1928 to 1936.
