= Landrienne =

- Township municipality
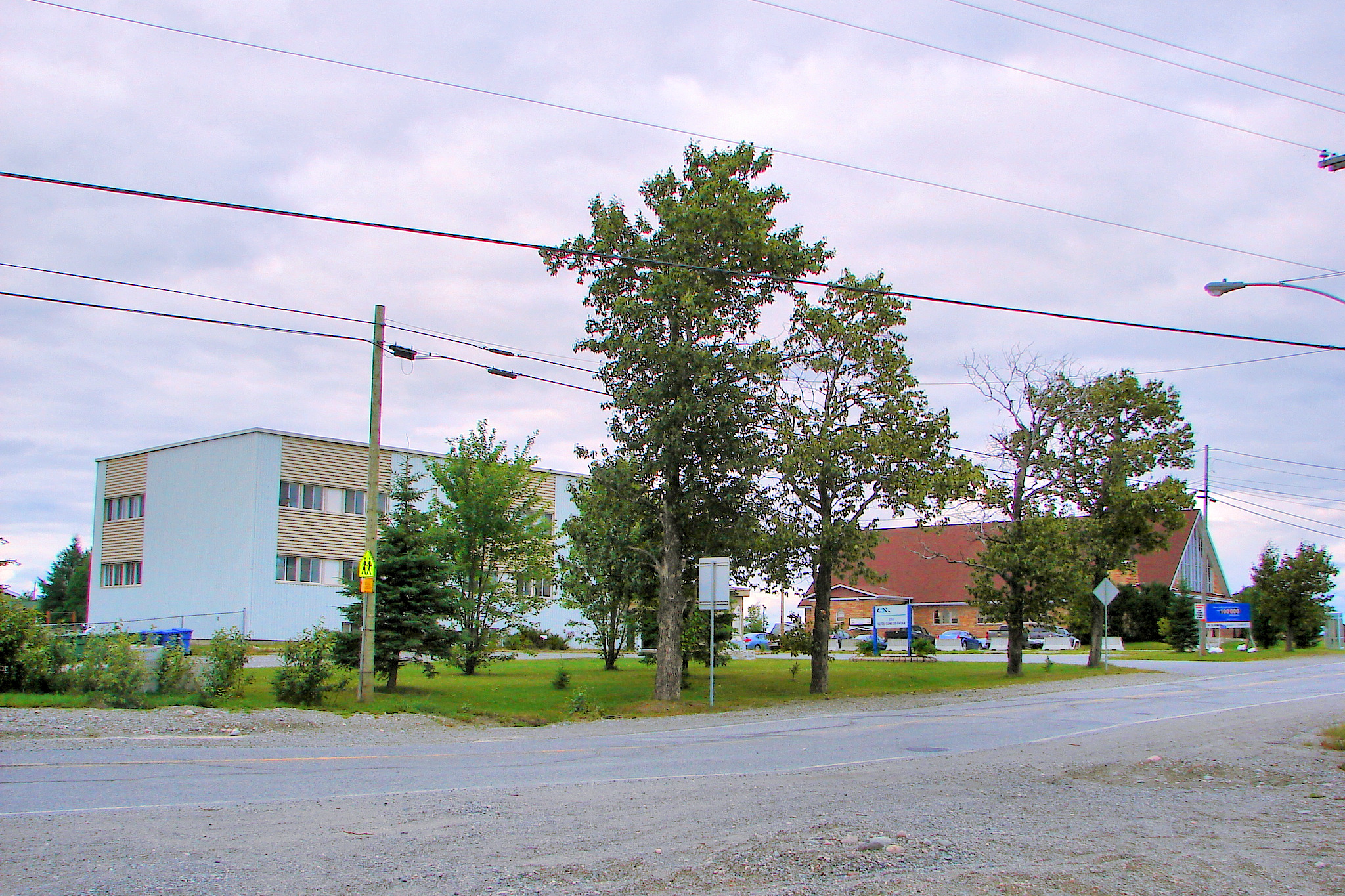

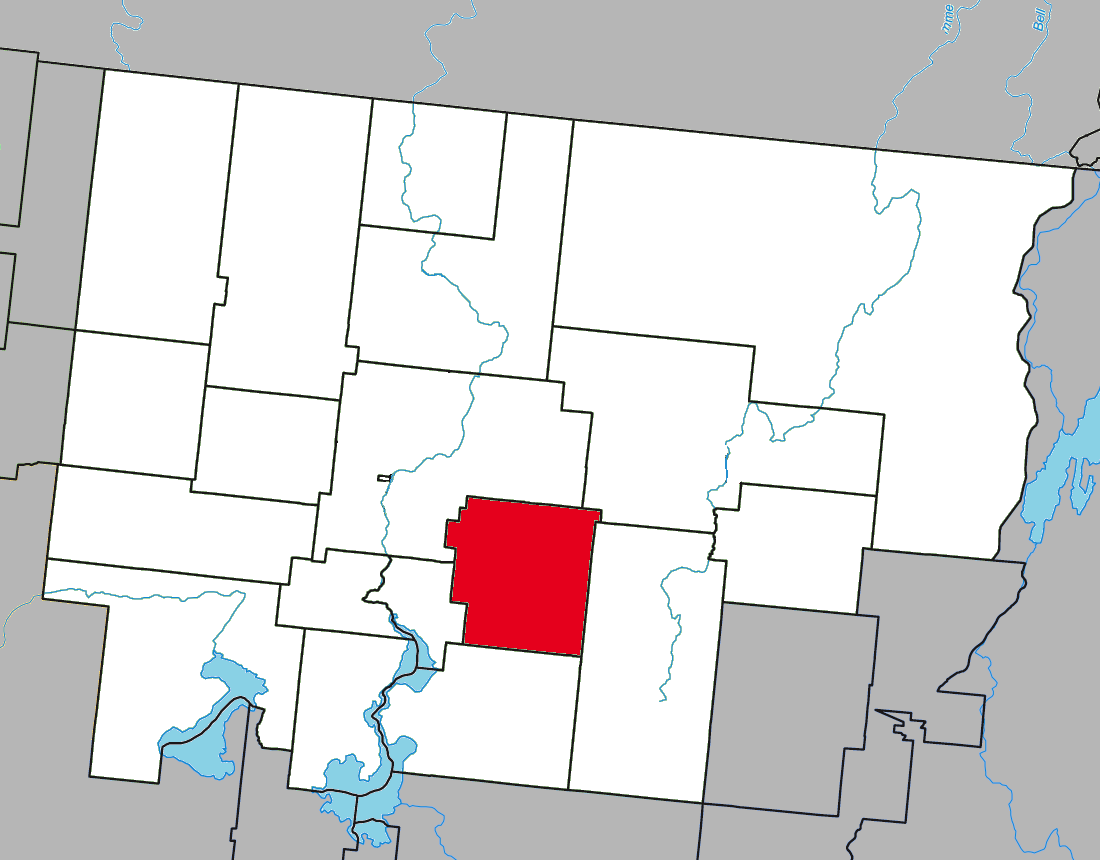
- Location within Abitibi RCM

- Location in western Quebec
- Coordinates: 48°33′N 77°57′W
- Country: Canada
- Province: Quebec
- Region: Abitibi-Témiscamingue
- RCM: Abitibi
- Settled: 1910s
- Constituted: July 15, 1918

Government
  - Mayor: Guillaume Lacasse
  - Federal riding: Abitibi—Témiscamingue
  - Prov. riding: Abitibi-Ouest

Area
  - Total: 277.42 km^{2} (107.11 sq mi)
  - Land: 275.93 km^{2} (106.54 sq mi)

Population (2021)
  - Total: 897
  - Density: 3.3/km^{2} (8.5/sq mi)
  - Pop (2016-21): ▼7.2%
  - Dwellings: 410
- Time zone: UTC−05:00 (EST)
  - Summer (DST): UTC−04:00 (EDT)
- Postal code(s): J0Y 1V0
- Area code: 819
- Highways: R-386
- Website: www.landrienne.com

Landrienne (French pronunciation: [lɑ̃dʁijɛn]) is a township municipality in the Canadian province of Quebec, located in the Abitibi Regional County Municipality. It is part of the census agglomeration of Amos.

Originally known as Saint-Barnabé-de-Landrienne, the place was named in honour of Jean-Marie Landriève Des Bordes (1712–1778), a French naval officer and administrative inspector.

Since its creation in 1918, several businesses were established in Landrienne, thus contributing to the economic development of the municipality.

== History ==
Landrienne was created in 1918 by a contingent of pioneers, who came mainly from Sainte-Thècle and Saint-Prosper, settled along the Transcontinental railroad, in an area 12 km east of the town of Amos and north of La Corne.

In 1926, a large section of Landrienne was taken for the creation of the municipality of Saint-Marc-de-Figuery (along with another section of Figuery-et-Dalquier).

== Demographics ==
In the 2021 Census of Population conducted by Statistics Canada, Landrienne had a population of 897 living in 398 of its 410 total private dwellings, a change of −7.2% from its 2016 population of 967. With a land area of 275.93 km^{2} (106.54 sq mi), it had a population density of 3.3/km^{2} (8.4/sq mi) in 2021.

The mother tongues are:

- English as first language: 0.6%
- French as first language: 98.3%
- English and French as first language: 0.6%
- Other as first language: 0.6%

Historical census populations – Landrienne

Year	Pop.	±%
1921	404	—
1931	438	+8.4%
1941	625	+42.7%
1951	595	−4.8%
1956	765	+28.6%
1961	801	+4.7%

Year	Pop.	±%
1966	763	−4.7%
1971	735	−3.7%
1976	840	+14.3%
1981	942	+12.1%
1986	991	+5.2%
1991	1,044	+5.3%

Year	Pop.	±%
1996	1,007	−3.5%
2001	1,072	+6.5%
2006	986	−8.0%
2011	977	−0.9%
2016	967	−1.0%
2021	897	−7.2%

Source: Statistics Canada

== Government ==
Municipal council (as of 2023):

- Mayor: Guy Baril
- Councillors: Josée Lavoie, Fanny Goulet, Stephan Rheault, Claude Leroux, Gabriel Gagnon, Gilles Héon
