= Vère (tributary river of the Noireau) =

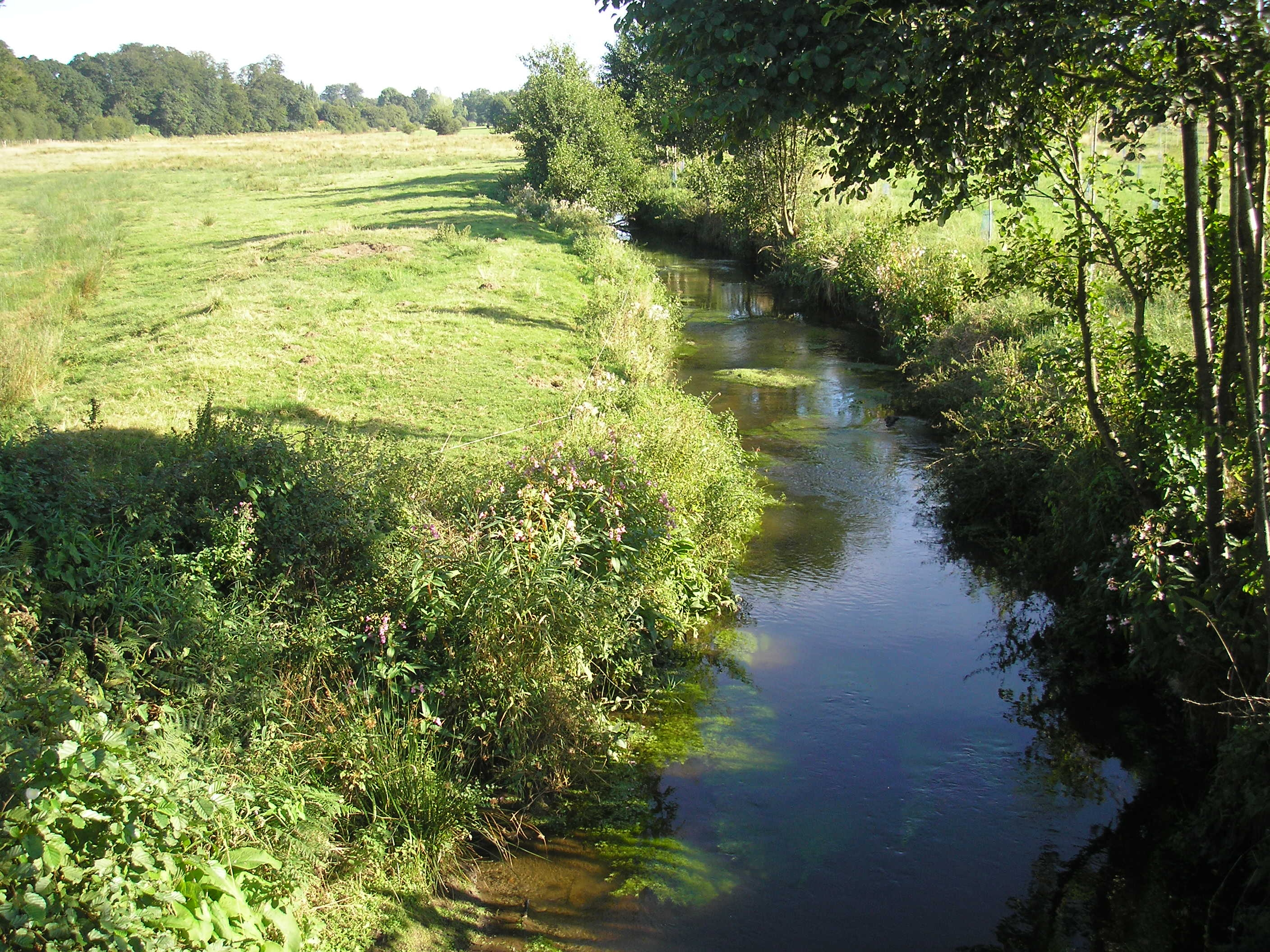
- The Vère flowing between Saint-Georges-des-Groseillers and La Lande-Patry

- Location within France Location within Normandy

Location
- Country: France

Physical characteristics
- Source
  - location: Landigou, Orne
- Mouth: Noireau
  - coordinates: 48°50′59.7″N 0°31′07.4″W
- Length: 24.78 km (15.40 mi)

Basin features
- Progression: Noireau→ Orne→ English Channel

The Vère (French pronunciation: [vɛʁ]) is a river in northwestern France, flowing through the department of Orne. It is 24.78 km long. Its source is in Landigou, and it flows into the river Noireau in the commune of Saint-Pierre-du-Regard and through Suisse Normande. It flows through these other communes Athis-Val de Rouvre, Aubusson, Caligny, Flers, La Lande-Patry, Messei, Montilly-sur-Noireau, Saint-Georges-des-Groseillers, Sainte-Honorine-la-Chardonne & La Selle-la-Forge many of which are in the area known as Suisse Normande.

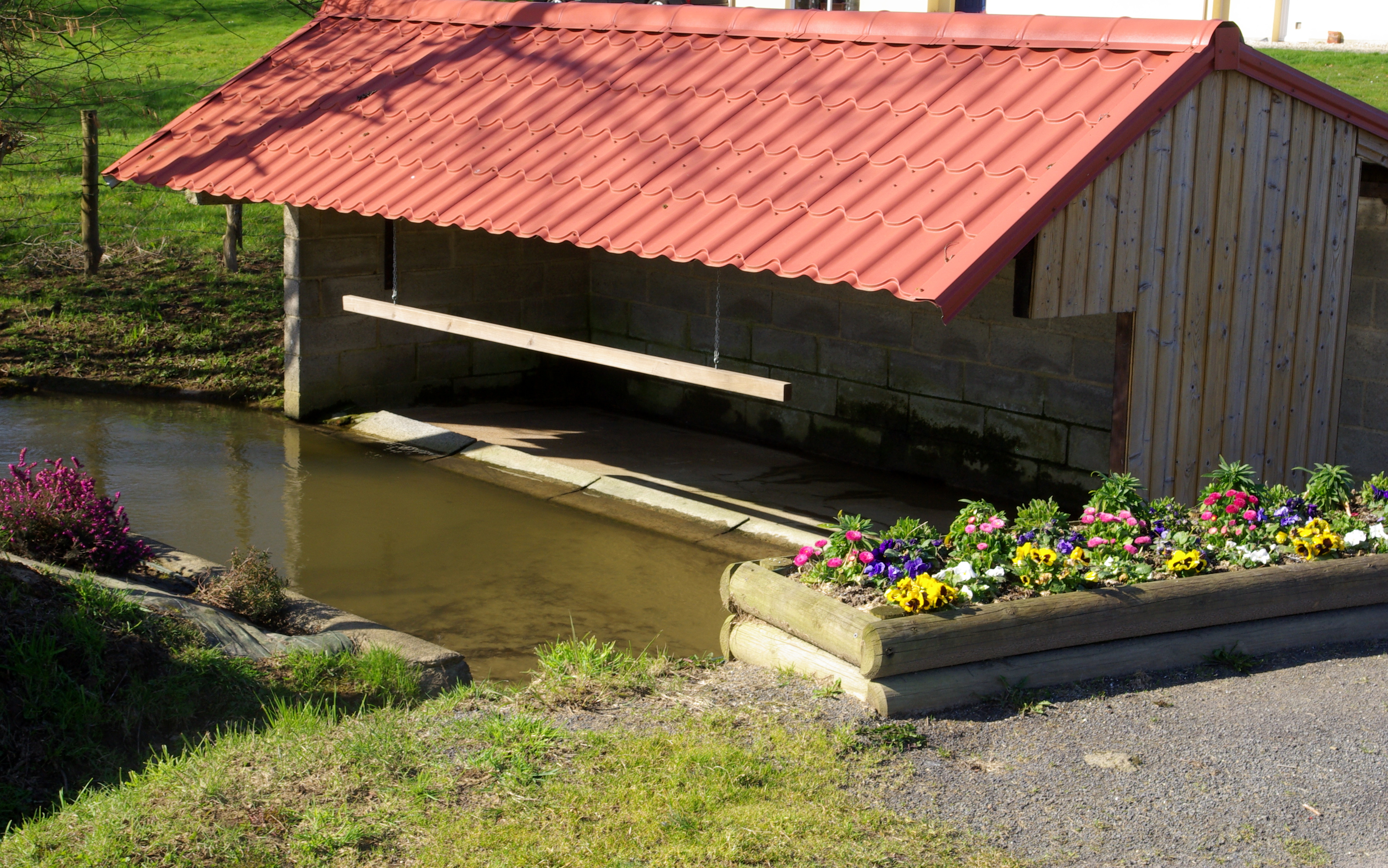
A Lavoir on the Vère in the commune of La-Lande-Patry

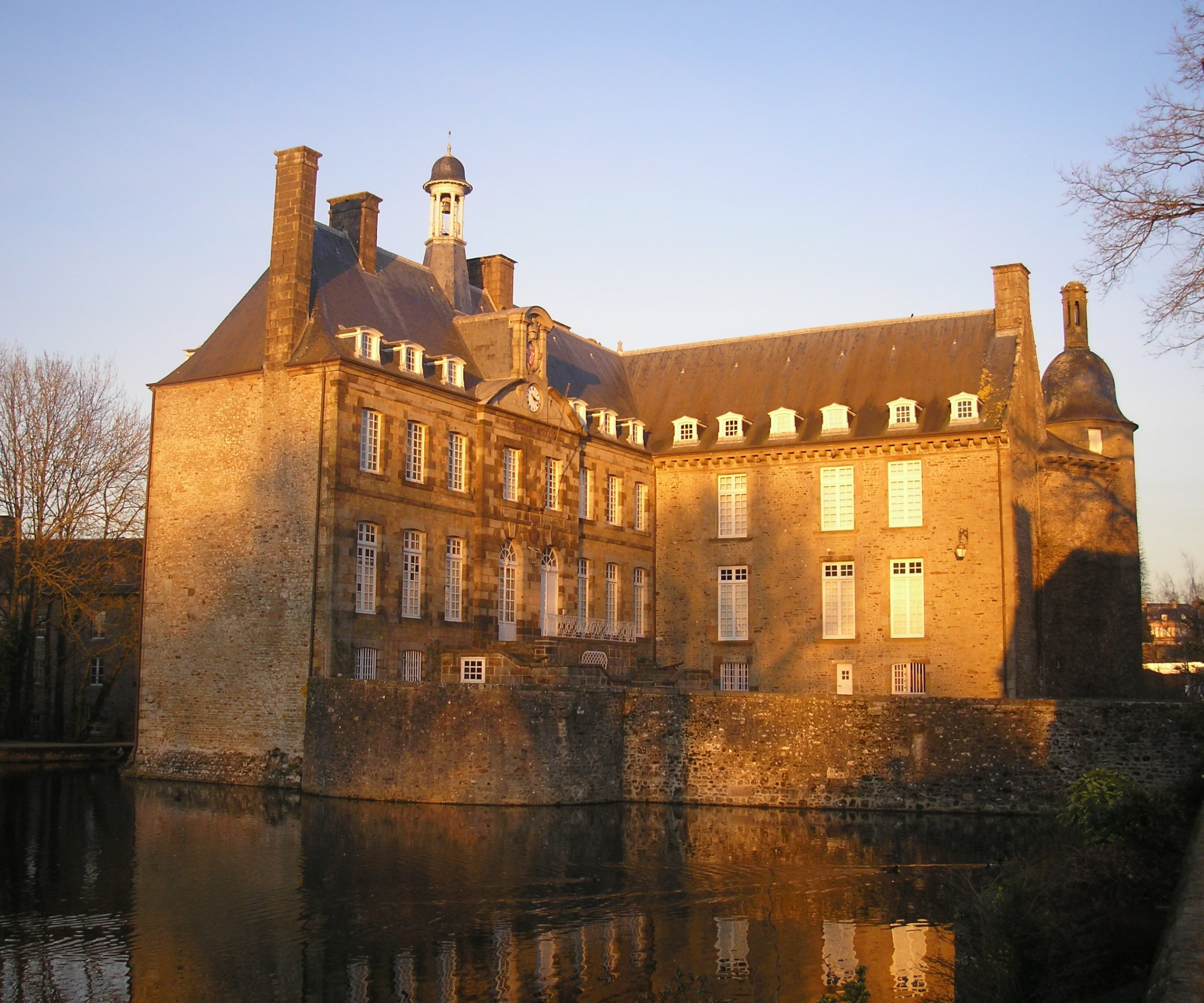
The Vère flowing around Flers Chateau
