= Saint-Pierre-du-Regard =

- Commune
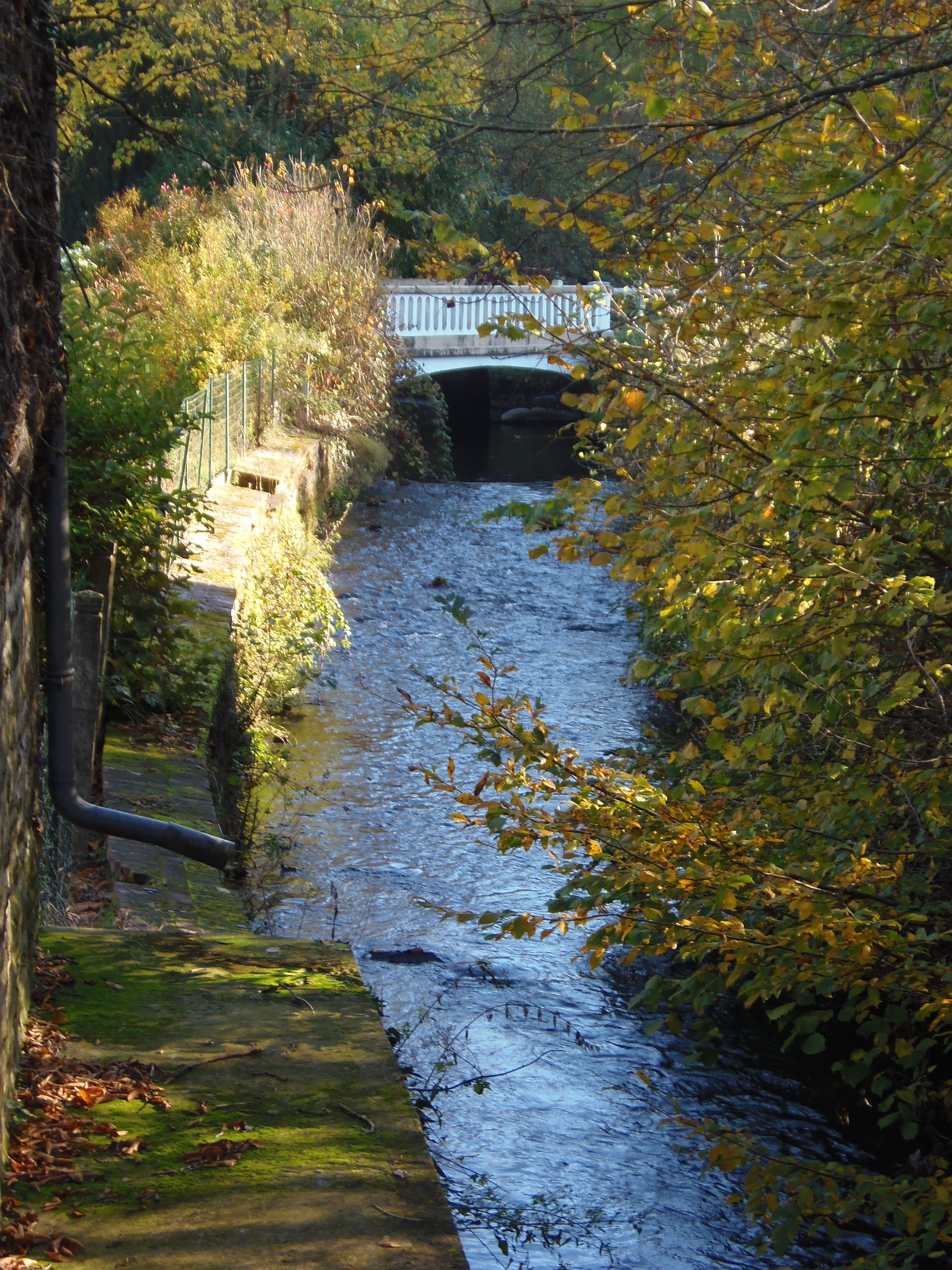
- Location of Saint-Pierre-du-Regard
- Location within France Location within Normandy
- Coordinates: 48°50′40″N 0°32′45″W
- Country: France
- Region: Normandy
- Department: Orne
- Arrondissement: Argentan
- Canton: Flers-2
- Intercommunality: CA Flers Agglo

Government
  - Mayor (2020–2026): Michèle Guicheteau
- Area^{1}: 9.3 km^{2} (3.6 sq mi)
- Elevation: 126 m (413 ft)
- Highest elevation: 218 m (715 ft)
- Lowest elevation: 69 m (226 ft)
- Population (2023): 1,321
  - Density: 140/km^{2} (370/sq mi)
- Time zone: UTC+01:00 (CET)
  - Summer (DST): UTC+02:00 (CEST)
- INSEE/Postal code: 61447 /61790
- ^{1} French Land Register data, which excludes lakes, ponds, glaciers > 1 km^{2} (0.386 sq mi or 247 acres) and river estuaries.

Saint-Pierre-du-Regard (French pronunciation: [sɛ̃ pjɛʁ dy ʁəɡaʁ]) is a commune in the Orne department in north-western France.

== Geography ==
The commune is part of the area known as Suisse Normande.

The commune is made up of the following collection of villages and hamlets, Le Grand Samoi, Le Haut Village, La Bristière, Le Vaugroult, La Remaisière, La Pivotière, La Houssaye, L'Être, La Petite Suisse and Saint-Pierre-du-Regard.

The commune has 2 rivers running through it the La Vere and Noireau.

== Points of interest ==
- Museum of Pont-Érambourg is a museum based at the former Pont-Érambourg station which was closed in 1970, dedicated to railway heritage. In addition the museum has a 13 km Velorail route that is open to the public.

=== Architecture contemporaine remarquable ===
- Église Saint Pierre was built in 1959 after the previous church was destroyed in World war 2. It was designed by architect Pierre Meurice and in 2004 won its label of Architecture contemporaine remarquable.

== People linked with the commune ==
- Raymond Martin (born 1949), a French former road bicycle racer was born here. In the 1980 Tour de France he finished third overall and won the mountains classification.

== See also ==
- Communes of the Orne department
