= Landigou =

- Commune
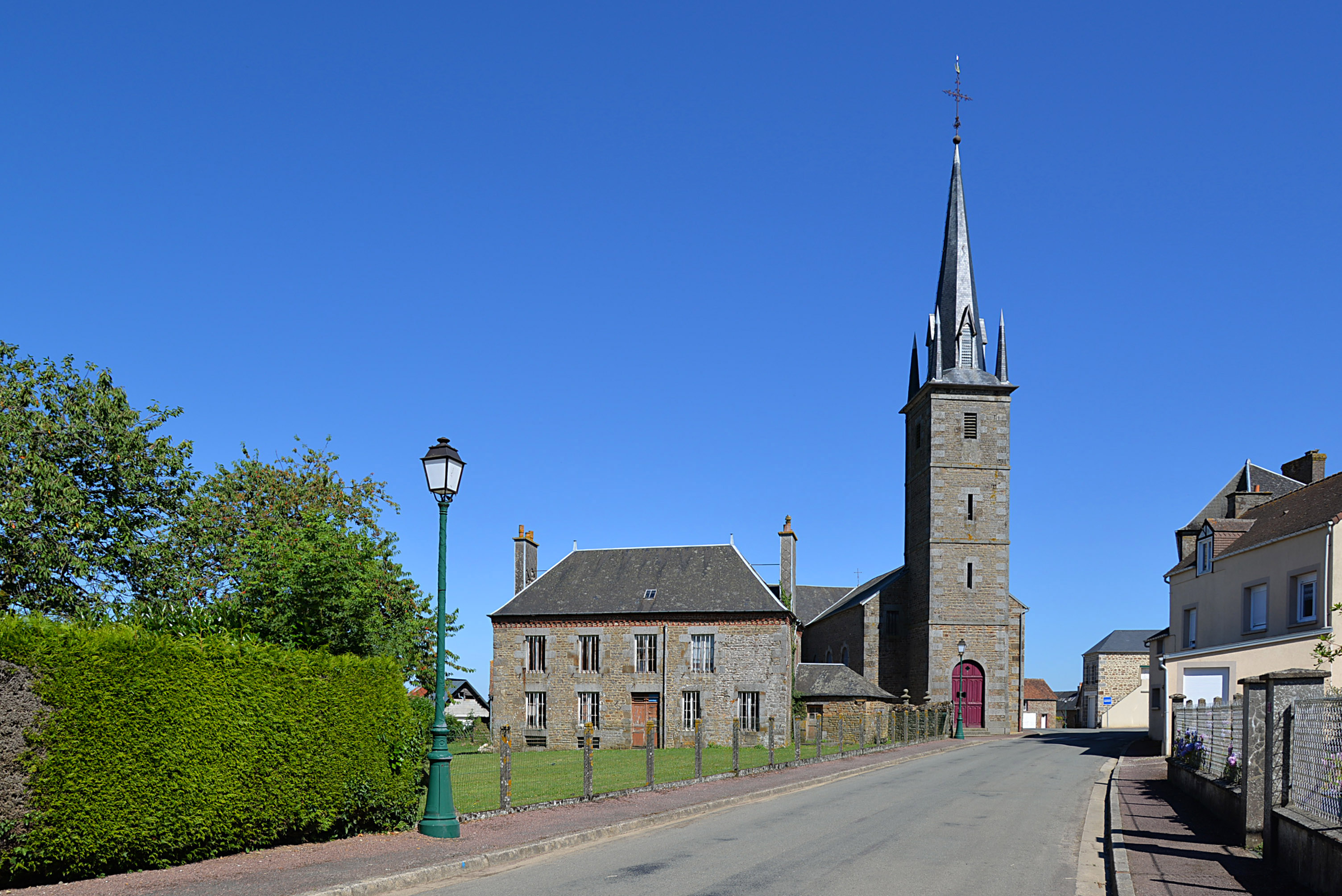
- The church in Landigou
- Location of Landigou
- Location within France Location within Normandy
- Coordinates: 48°44′48″N 0°28′13″W
- Country: France
- Region: Normandy
- Department: Orne
- Arrondissement: Argentan
- Canton: Flers-2
- Intercommunality: CA Flers Agglo

Government
  - Mayor (2020–2026): Albert Chatelais
- Area^{1}: 5.36 km^{2} (2.07 sq mi)
- Highest elevation: 273 m (896 ft)
- Lowest elevation: 204 m (669 ft)
- Population (2023): 417
  - Density: 77.8/km^{2} (201/sq mi)
- Demonym: Landigulfiens
- Time zone: UTC+01:00 (CET)
  - Summer (DST): UTC+02:00 (CEST)
- INSEE/Postal code: 61221 /61100
- ^{1} French Land Register data, which excludes lakes, ponds, glaciers > 1 km^{2} (0.386 sq mi or 247 acres) and river estuaries.

Landigou (French pronunciation: [lɑ̃diɡu]) is a commune in the Orne department in north-western France.

== Geography ==
The commune is made up of the following collection of villages and hamlets, La Cour, Le Vauru and Landigou.

The commune is on the border of the area known as Suisse Normande.

It is 540 hectares (2.1 sq mi) in size. The highest point in the commune is 260 metres (850 ft).

Four watercourses run through the commune, two rivers, La Vere & Gine, plus two streams the Loget & la Ferronniere.

== See also ==
- Communes of the Orne department
