= Montilly-sur-Noireau =

- Commune
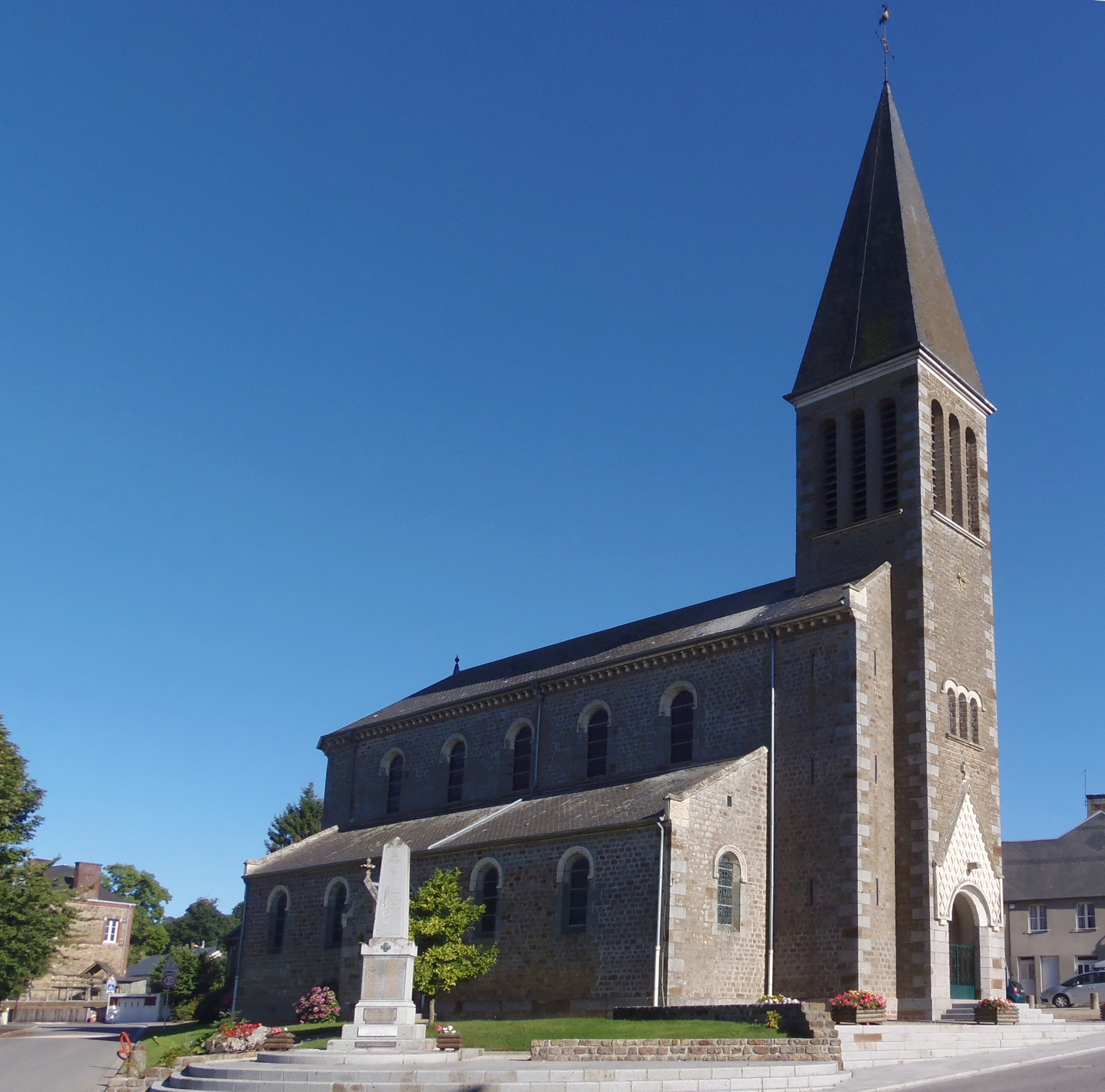
- The church in Montilly-sur-Noireau
- Location of Montilly-sur-Noireau
- Location within France Location within Normandy
- Coordinates: 48°48′57″N 0°34′20″W
- Country: France
- Region: Normandy
- Department: Orne
- Arrondissement: Argentan
- Canton: Flers-2
- Intercommunality: CA Flers Agglo

Government
  - Mayor (2020–2026): Alain Delaunay
- Area^{1}: 11.03 km^{2} (4.26 sq mi)
- Highest elevation: 234 m (768 ft)
- Lowest elevation: 85 m (279 ft)
- Population (2023): 723
  - Density: 65.5/km^{2} (170/sq mi)
- Demonym: Montillais
- Time zone: UTC+01:00 (CET)
  - Summer (DST): UTC+02:00 (CEST)
- INSEE/Postal code: 61287 /61100
- ^{1} French Land Register data, which excludes lakes, ponds, glaciers > 1 km^{2} (0.386 sq mi or 247 acres) and river estuaries.

Montilly-sur-Noireau (French pronunciation: [mɔ̃tiji syʁ nwaʁo], lit. 'Montilly on Noireau') is a commune in the Orne department in north-western France.

== Geography ==
The commune is part of the area known as Suisse Normande.

The commune is made up of the following collection of villages and hamlets, La Mainguère,Le Pont, Les Fontaines, La Michellerie,Le Jardin,La Bissonnière,Damecent,Le Prail,La Canne and Montilly-sur-Noireau.

The commune has 4 watercourses running through it two rivers the Noireau & La Vere, and two streams the Aubusson & Vallee.

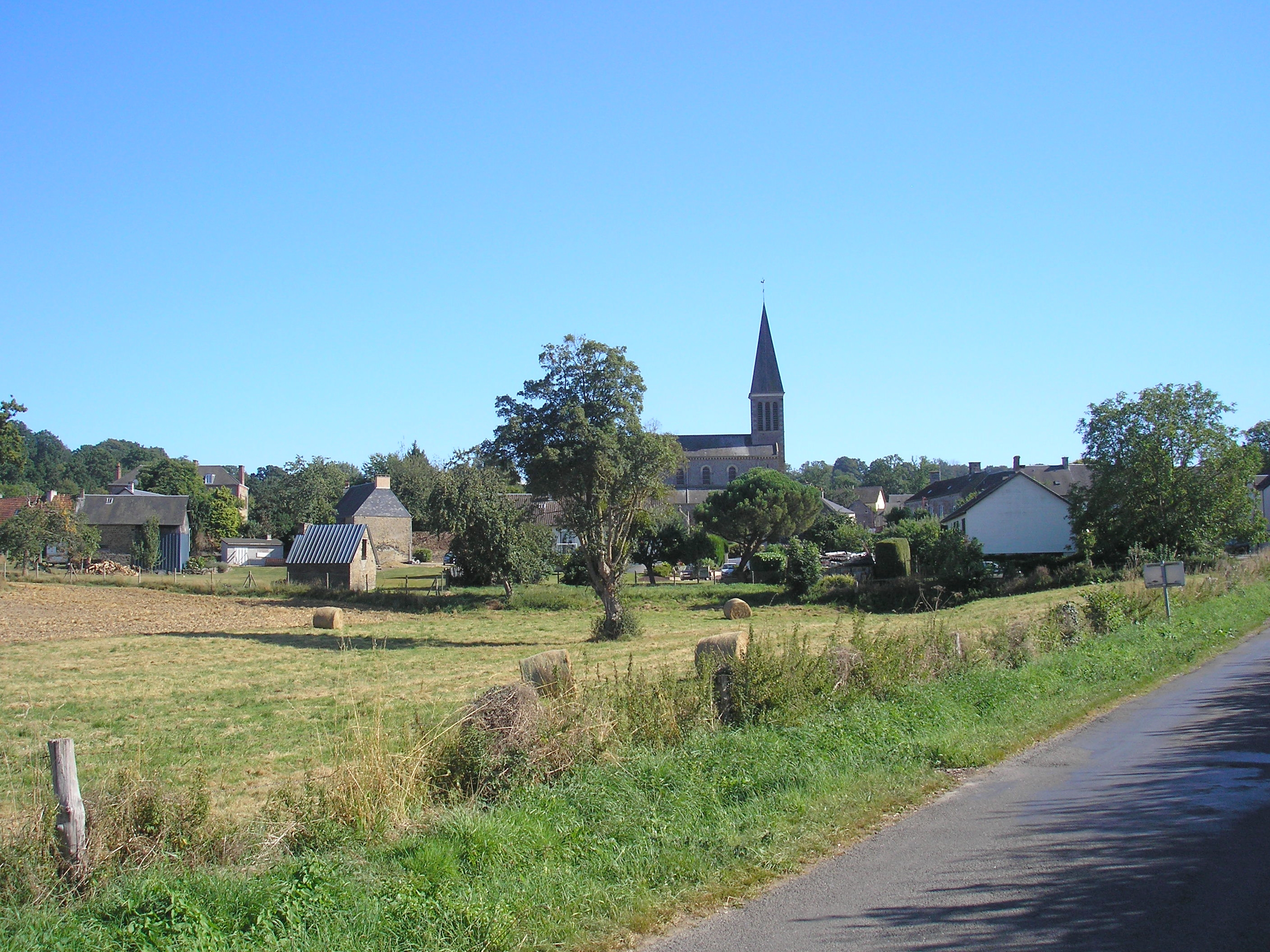
Montilly Sur Noireau

== Culture ==
- Saint-Denis fair - Since at least 1789 the commune has had a fair each year at the start of October. The fair features a variety of rides and exhibitors attracting over 100,000 visitors per year.
- Eskape festival is an annual Techno and Electronic dance music weekend festival that occurs on the communes fair ground site between the end of July to mid August. It attracts about 20,000 visitors per year.

== See also ==
- Communes of the Orne department
