= La Selle-la-Forge =

- Commune
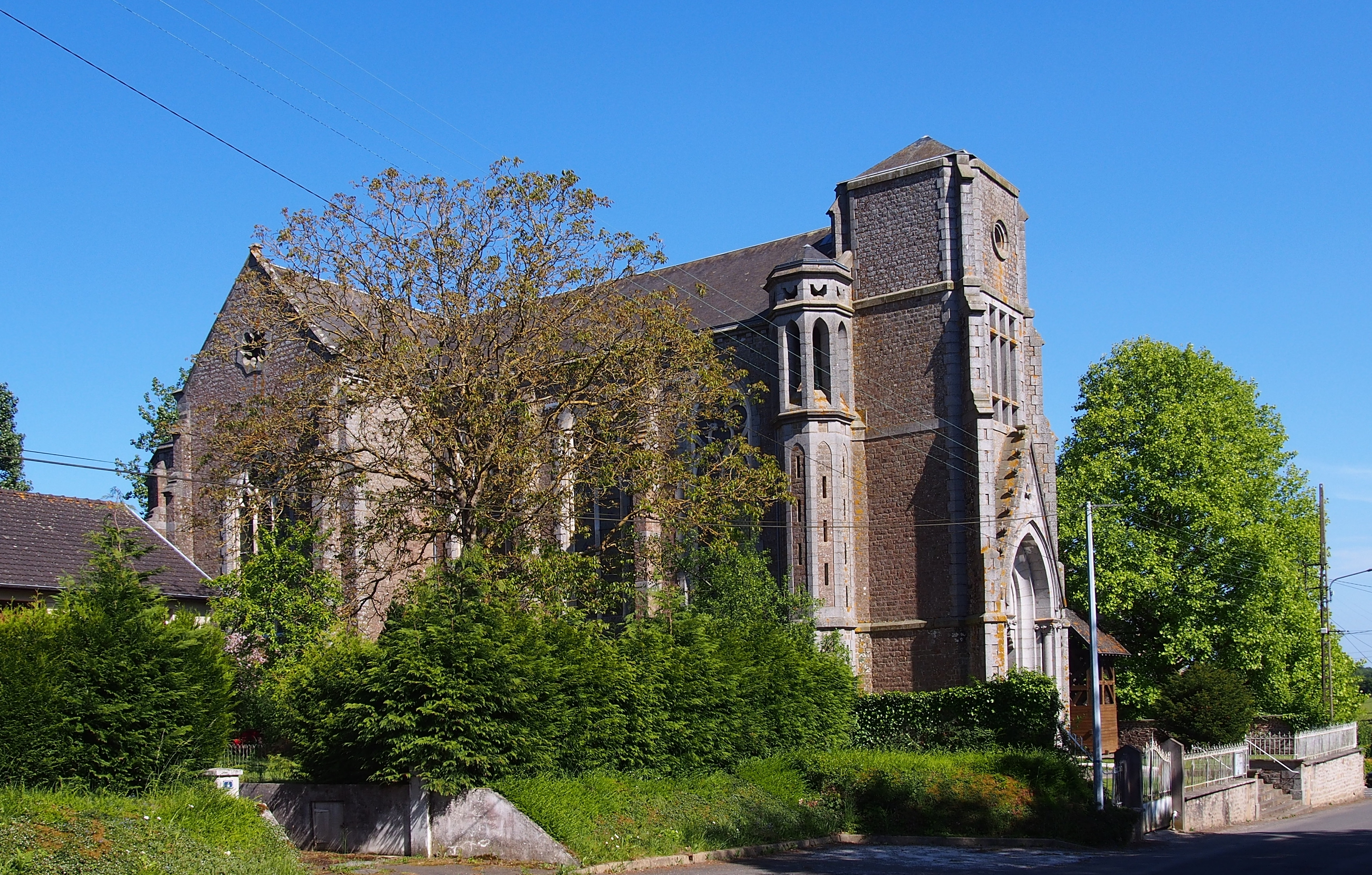
- The church in La Selle-la-Forge
- Location of La Selle-la-Forge
- Location within France Location within Normandy
- Coordinates: 48°44′02″N 0°32′20″W
- Country: France
- Region: Normandy
- Department: Orne
- Arrondissement: Argentan
- Canton: Flers-2
- Intercommunality: CA Flers Agglo

Government
  - Mayor (2020–2026): Sylvie Thieulent
- Area^{1}: 8.32 km^{2} (3.21 sq mi)
- Elevation: 200 m (660 ft)
- Highest elevation: 266 m (873 ft)
- Lowest elevation: 185 m (607 ft)
- Population (2023): 1,390
  - Density: 167/km^{2} (433/sq mi)
- Time zone: UTC+01:00 (CET)
  - Summer (DST): UTC+02:00 (CEST)
- INSEE/Postal code: 61466 /61100
- ^{1} French Land Register data, which excludes lakes, ponds, glaciers > 1 km^{2} (0.386 sq mi or 247 acres) and river estuaries.

La Selle-la-Forge (French pronunciation: [la sɛl la fɔʁʒ]) is a commune in the Orne department in north-western France.

== Geography ==
The commune is made up of the following collection of villages and hamlets, Le Carrefour Paris, Les Champs, Le Moulin, Le Hamel Hélie, Le Hamel Chauvin, La Halouzière, La Selle-la-Forge, La Rivière and Les Aclos.

It is 830 hectares (3.2 sq mi) in size. The highest point in the commune is 213 metres (699 ft).

A river, La Vere, along with four streams, La Blanche Lande, La Fontaine, the Blanche-Lande and the Blanche-Lande, are the 5 main watercourses flowing through the commune.

The commune is on the border of the area known as Suisse Normande.

== See also ==
- Communes of the Orne department
