= Saint-Georges-des-Groseillers =

Commune in the Orne department of France

- Commune
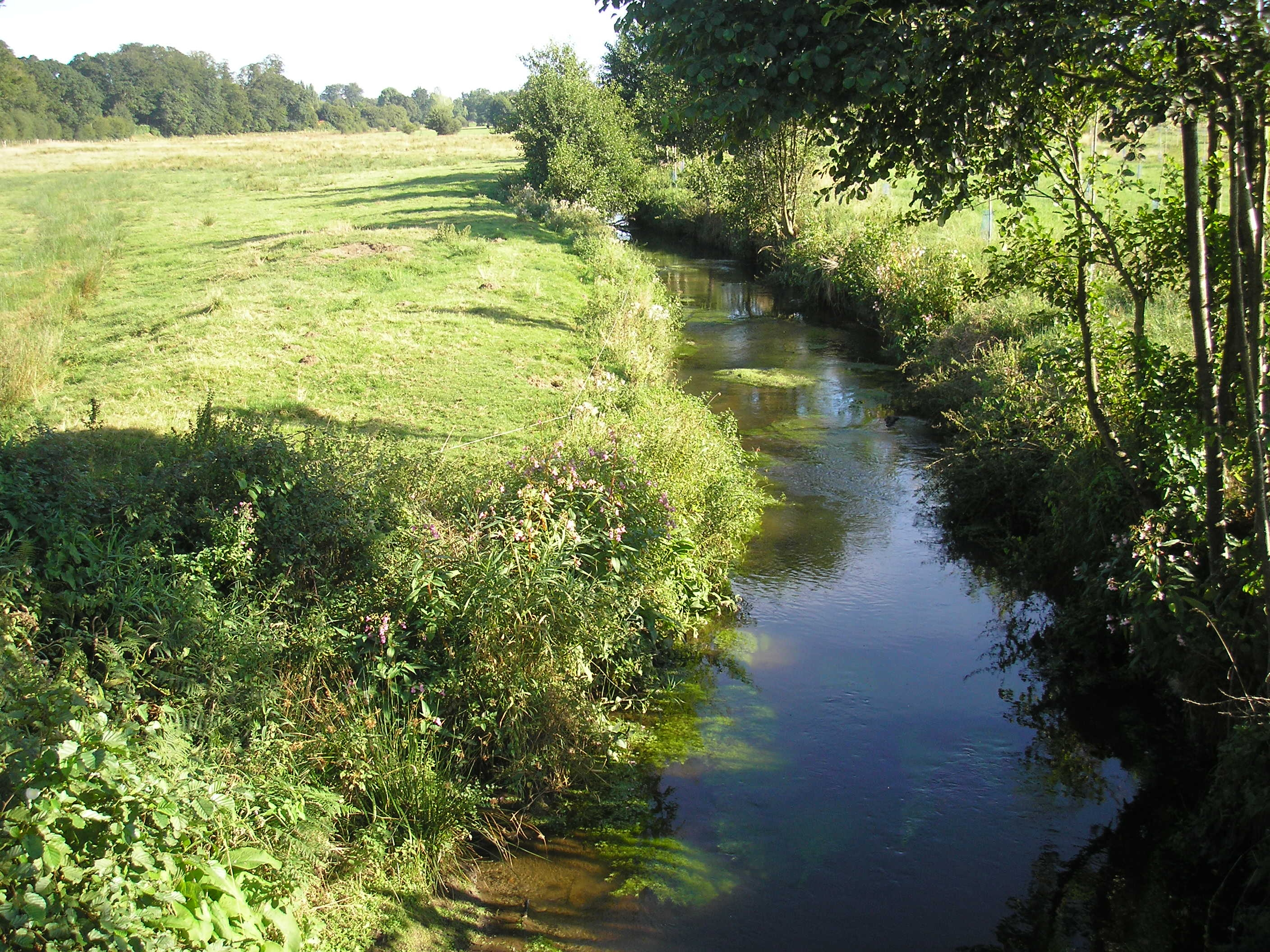
- Location of Saint-Georges-des-Groseillers
- Location within France Location within Normandy
- Coordinates: 48°46′16″N 0°34′20″W
- Country: France
- Region: Normandy
- Department: Orne
- Arrondissement: Argentan
- Canton: Flers-2
- Intercommunality: CA Flers Agglo

Government
  - Mayor (2020–2026): Jean-Michel Olivier
- Area^{1}: 7.06 km^{2} (2.73 sq mi)
- Elevation: 298 m (978 ft)
- Highest elevation: 276 m (906 ft)
- Lowest elevation: 172 m (564 ft)
- Population (2023): 3,173
  - Density: 449/km^{2} (1,160/sq mi)
- Time zone: UTC+01:00 (CET)
  - Summer (DST): UTC+02:00 (CEST)
- INSEE/Postal code: 61391 /61100
- ^{1} French Land Register data, which excludes lakes, ponds, glaciers > 1 km^{2} (0.386 sq mi or 247 acres) and river estuaries.

Saint-Georges-des-Groseillers (French pronunciation: [sɛ̃ ʒɔʁʒ de ɡʁozɛje]) is a commune in the Orne department in north-western France.

== Geography ==
The commune is made up of the following collection of villages and hamlets, La Fosse, La Riptière, La Bourdonnière, Launay Cornu, Bellevue, Le Haut Faix, Le Hameau de Vère, Le Bas Faix and Saint-Georges-des-Groseillers.

It is 710 hectares (2.7 sq mi) in size. The highest point in the commune is 210 metres (690 ft).

A river, La Vere, along with the Aubusson stream are the only two watercourses flowing through the commune.

The commune is on the border of the area known as Suisse Normande.

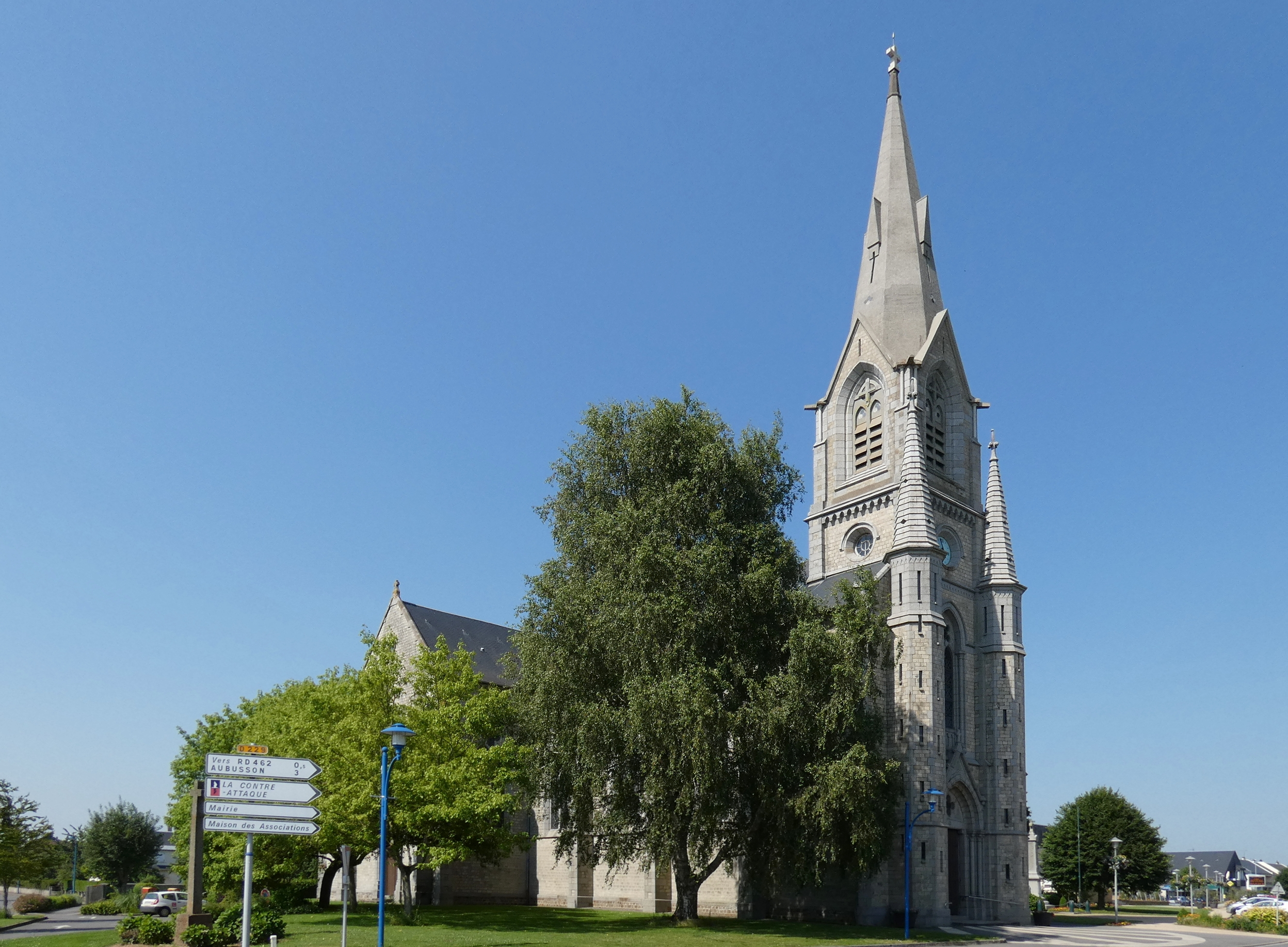
Church of Saint-Georges-des-Groseillers

== Population ==
Historical population
Year	Pop.	±% p.a.
1968	2,691	—
1975	2,941	+1.28%
1982	3,405	+2.11%
1990	3,361	−0.16%
1999	3,259	−0.34%
2007	3,184	−0.29%
2012	3,263	+0.49%
2017	3,196	−0.41%
2023	3,173	−0.12%
Source: INSEE

== Notable people ==
- François Morel (1959) an actor, comedian, voice actor, rapper and director was born here.

== See also ==
- Communes of the Orne department
