= Château de Flers =

Château in Villeneuve d'Ascq, Nord, France

Coordinates: 50°38′9″N 3°7′58″E

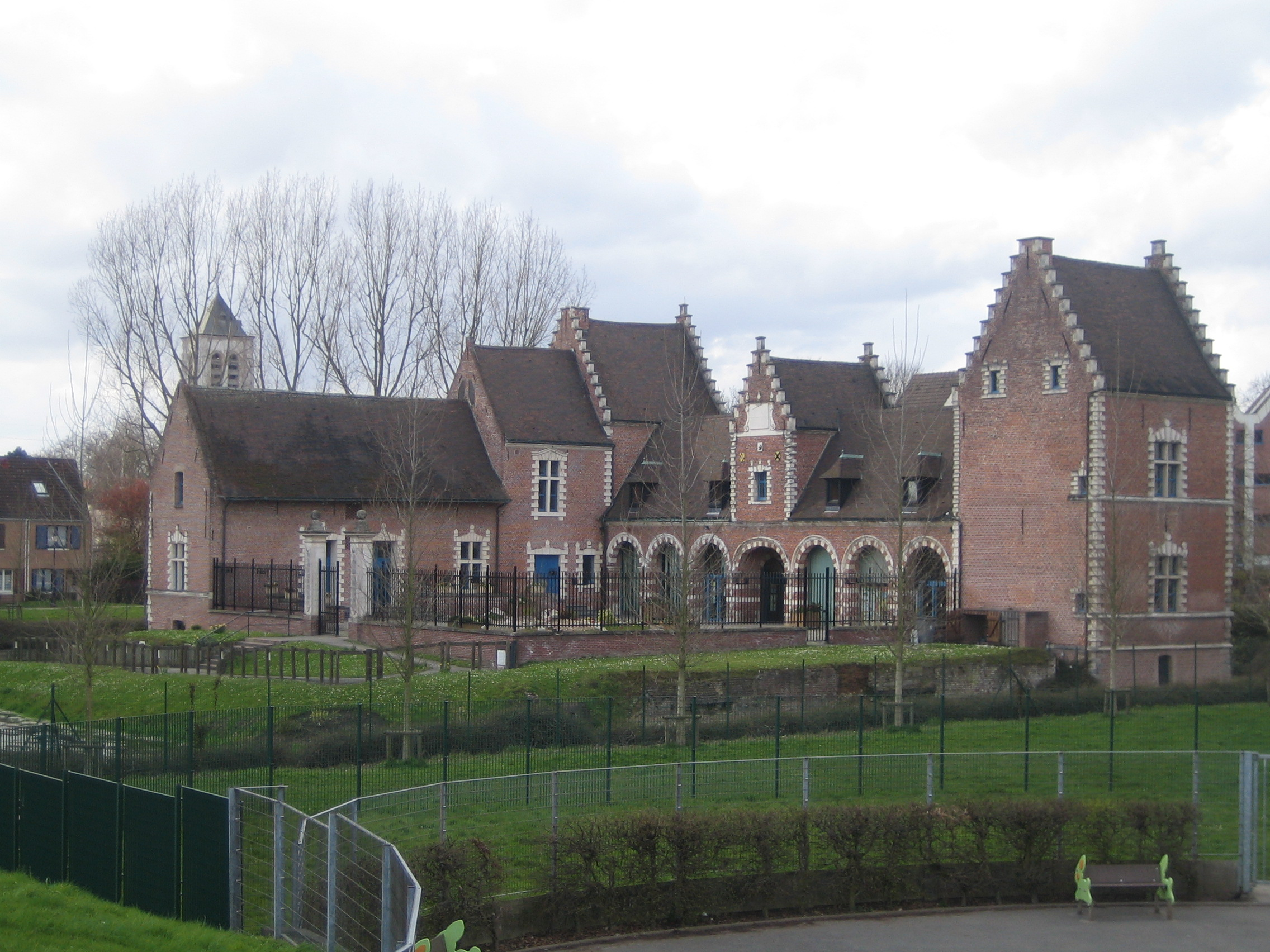
The Château de Flers

The Château de Flers (French pronunciation: [ʃato də flɛʁs]) is a château located in Villeneuve d'Ascq, in the Nord department of France. It hosts the Château de Flers museum and the tourism office of Villeneuve d'Ascq city. The château is named after a former nearby village of Flers-lez-Lille.

== History ==
The château, completed in 1661, is very characteristic of the Flemish architecture of the 17th century. From 1667 to 1747, it belonged to the De Kessel family, the Seigneurs of Flers. In 1747, Philippe André de Baudequin, seigneur of Sainghin, obtains the seigneurie of Flers and the château from his De Kessel cousin. In 1770, Marie-Claire-Josephe de Baudequin married count Ladislas de Diesbach. When his wife died in 1791, he inherits the château and he will be the last seigneur of Flers.

Around 1787, the château was modified: the mullions of the windows were removed, the French ceilings were replaced by box-section ceilings, and new chimneys were built. The original drawbridge was replaced by a new one, which still exists. The archway arcade is from this time. During the French Revolution, the family emigrated. The château, entrusted to the care of the former gardener, fell in disrepair and was eventually converted into a farmhouse (La ferme d'en bas).

In 1937, Paul Delesalle-Dewas sold the château to the De Diesbach family. In 1951, it was listed as a historic monument. In 1969 it was purchased by the State of France, in 1973 it passed to the commune, and in 1986 to the city of Villeneuve d'Ascq. The restoration was completed by 1991. Since then, the building houses the tourism office and other municipal departments.

== Architecture ==
The château is characteristic of the Flemish rural architecture of the 17th century.

== Château de Flers Museum ==
Four rooms in the basement were doing up an archeologic museum in 1991. The museum hosts also temporarily exhibitions, about archeology, local history and regional ethography.

== Gallery ==
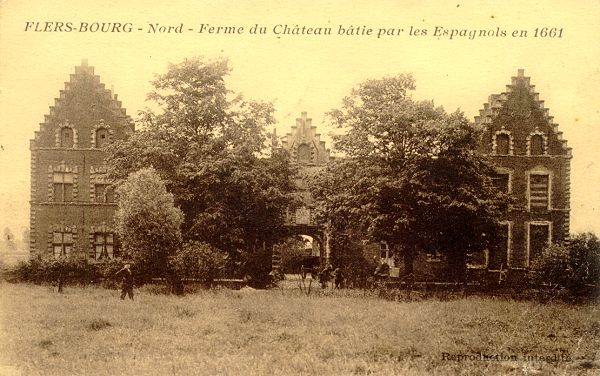
Château de Flers around 1900

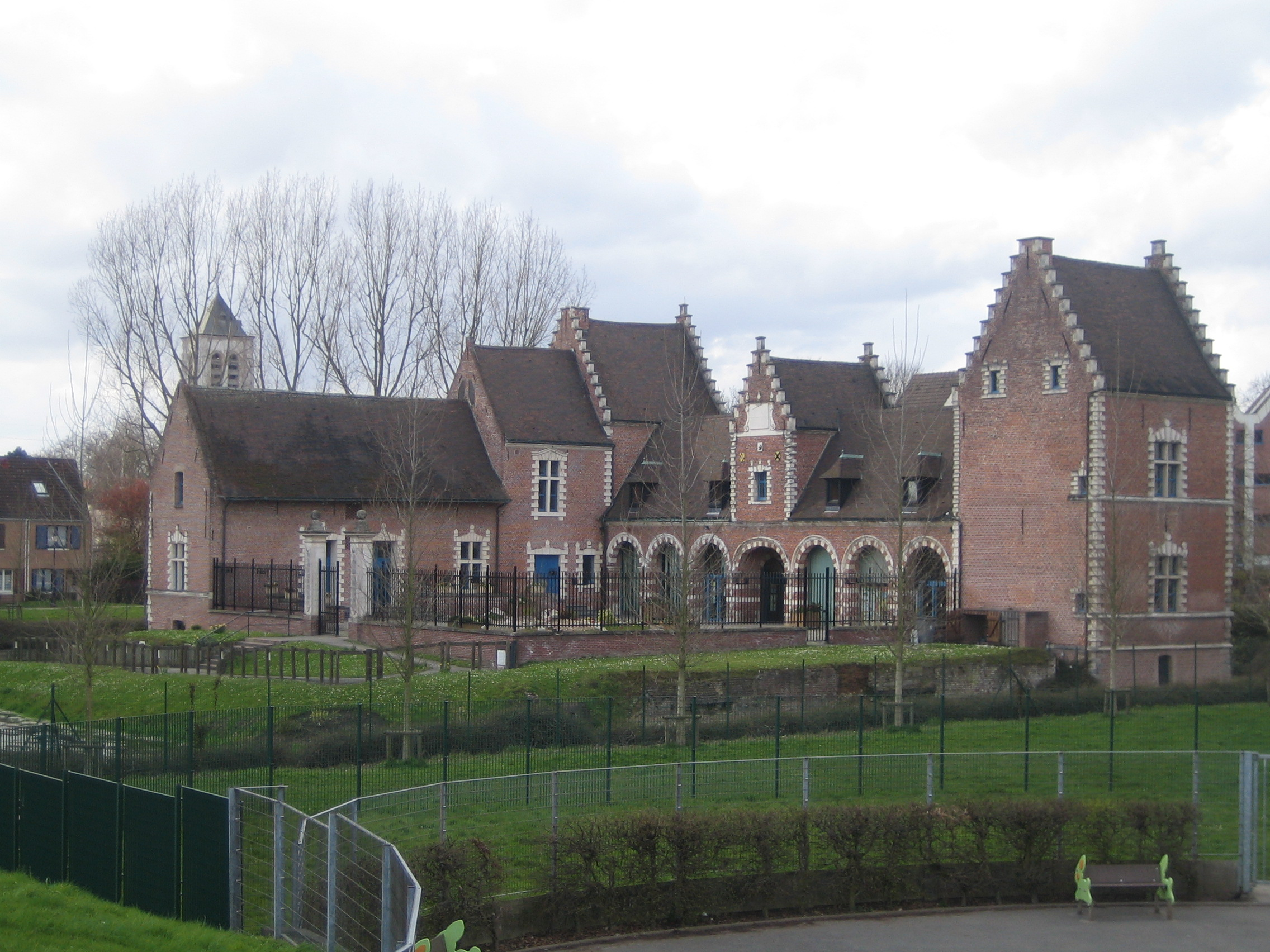
Le château from the back

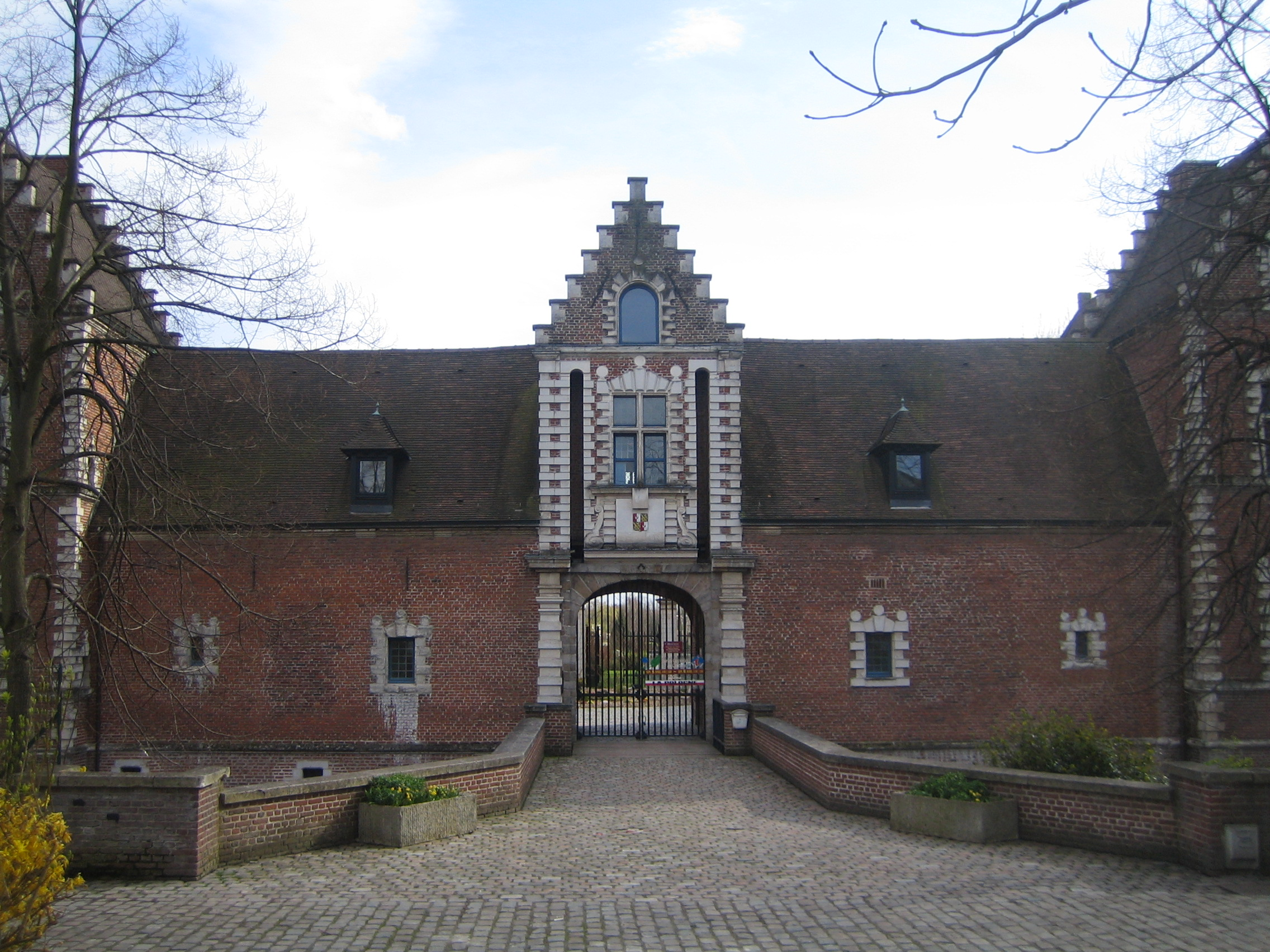
Entry
