= Louis Barrabé =

French economic field geologist and professor

- Born: Louis Cupif; 15 March 1895; Bonneval
- Died: 13 February 1961 (aged 65); 14th arrondissement of Paris
- Resting place: Flers
- Education: École normale supérieure (Paris) & University of Caen Normandy
- Occupation: geologist

Louis Barrabé (15 March 1895 – 13 February 1961) was a French economic field geologist and professor who contributed to studies of the geology of Madagascar and the Caribbean Islands of Martinique and Guadeloupe.

Barrabé was born in Bonneval where his father was an amateur naturalist and member of the Linnean Society of Normandy. Interested in natural history at an early age but his studies were interrupted by the war. He was conscripted during World War I and demobilized in 1919 as a lieutenant and awarded a Croix de Guerre. He then applied to the Ecole normale supérieure where his brother had studied before being killed in the war. He graduated in 1921, studying under Léon Bertrand along with Pierre Viennot and Daniel Schneegans. Together they worked on the field and discovered an oil deposit at Gabian in 1924 and natural gas at Saint-Marcet in 1939. In 1927 he was posted to Martinique and began to suffer from paralysis of the legs from which he recovered after returning to France. It is thought that it may have been a poisoning attempt. His doctoral thesis at the University of Paris was on the geology of Martinique and Guadeloupe. He taught at the University of Paris from 1931 to 1961. His students discovered uranium deposits in France in 1948. He taught his students empiricism and dissuaded them from holding too tightly to theories. He died from a heart attack.
