= Aubusson, Orne =

Aubusson
- Commune
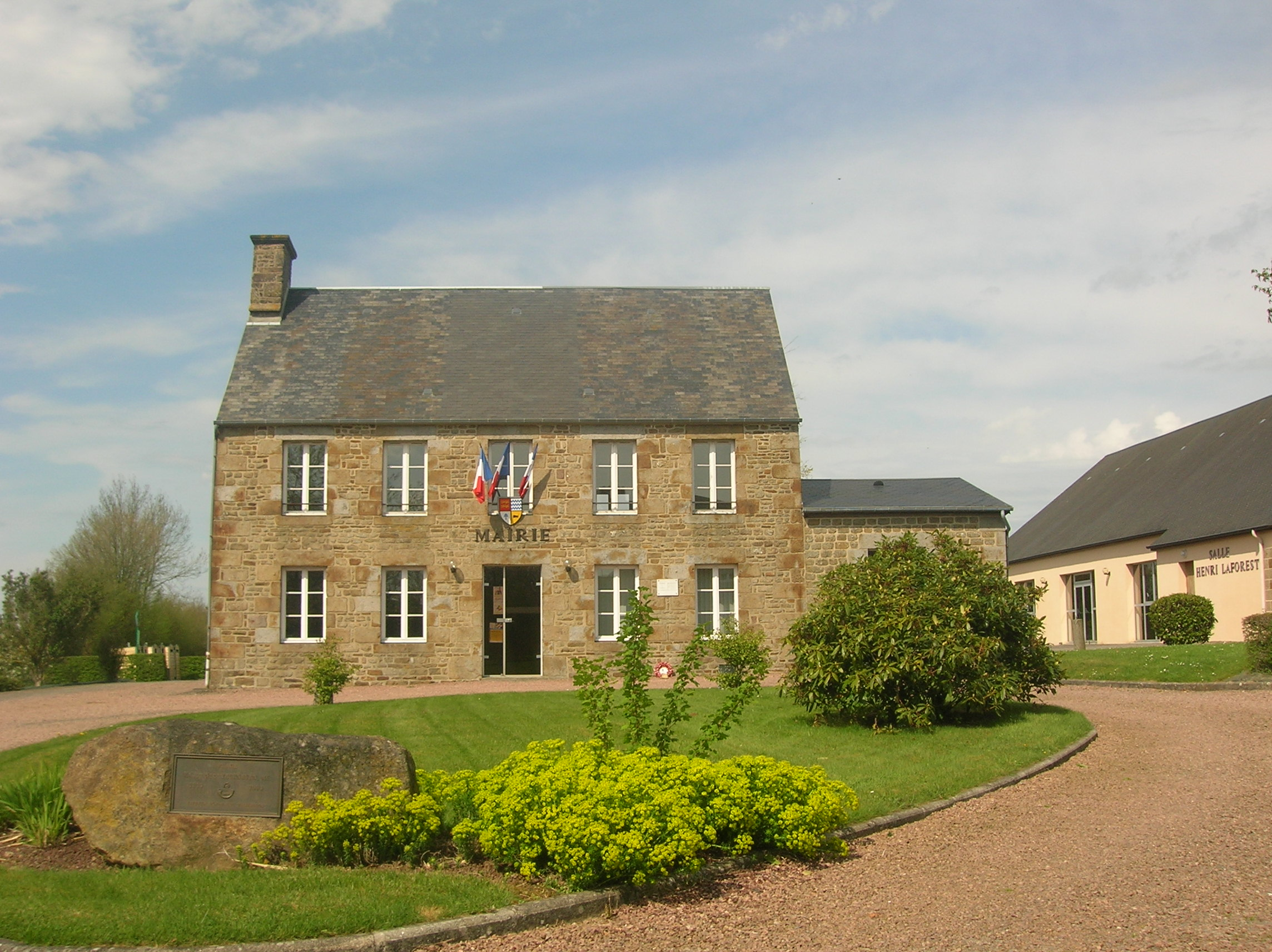
- The town hall in Aubusson

- Coat of arms
- Location of Aubusson
- Location within France Location within Normandy
- Coordinates: 48°47′06″N 0°33′05″W
- Country: France
- Region: Normandy
- Department: Orne
- Arrondissement: Argentan
- Canton: Flers-2
- Intercommunality: CA Flers Agglo

Government
  - Mayor (2020–2026): Sylvain Boulant
- Area^{1}: 3.90 km^{2} (1.51 sq mi)
- Elevation: 264 m (866 ft)
- Highest elevation: 272 m (892 ft)
- Lowest elevation: 168 m (551 ft)
- Population (2023): 391
  - Density: 100/km^{2} (260/sq mi)
- Time zone: UTC+01:00 (CET)
  - Summer (DST): UTC+02:00 (CEST)
- INSEE/Postal code: 61011 /61100
- ^{1} French Land Register data, which excludes lakes, ponds, glaciers > 1 km^{2} (0.386 sq mi or 247 acres) and river estuaries.

Aubusson (French pronunciation: [obysɔ̃]) is a commune in the Orne department in northwestern France.

== Geography ==
The commune is part of the area known as Suisse Normande.

The commune is made up of the following collection of villages and hamlets, La Maillardière, Le Hamel du Bois, Le Coudray, La Guermondière and Aubusson.

The commune has 2 watercourses running through it a river, La Vere and 1 stream the Aubusson.

== Population ==
Historical population
Year	Pop.	±% p.a.
1968	189	—
1975	221	+2.26%
1982	314	+5.15%
1990	329	+0.59%
1999	335	+0.20%
2007	399	+2.21%
2012	422	+1.13%
2017	431	+0.42%
2023	391	−1.61%
Source: INSEE

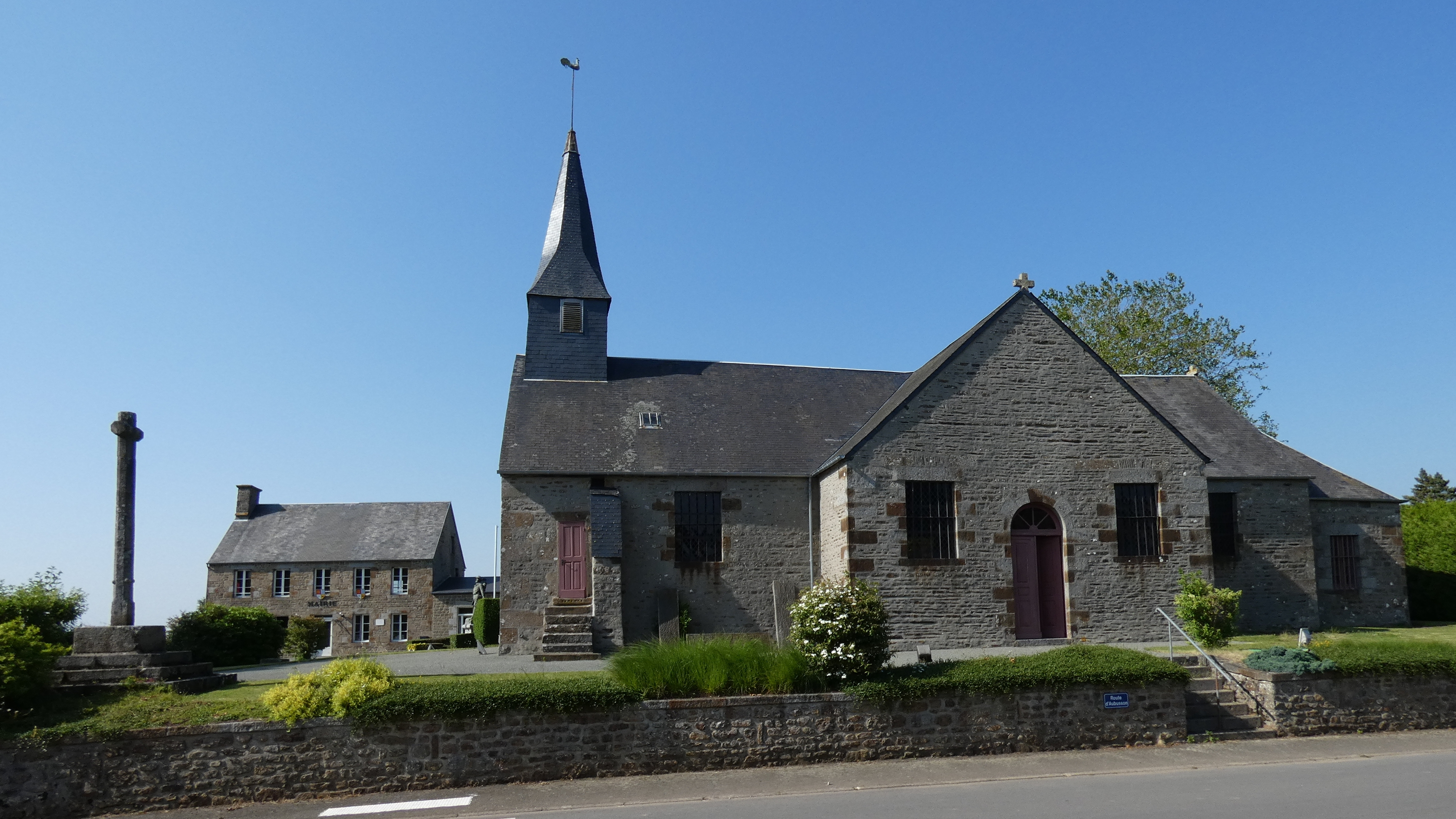
Aubusson church and Mayors office

== See also ==
- Communes of the Orne department
