= Merlerault =

Ancient French breed of horse

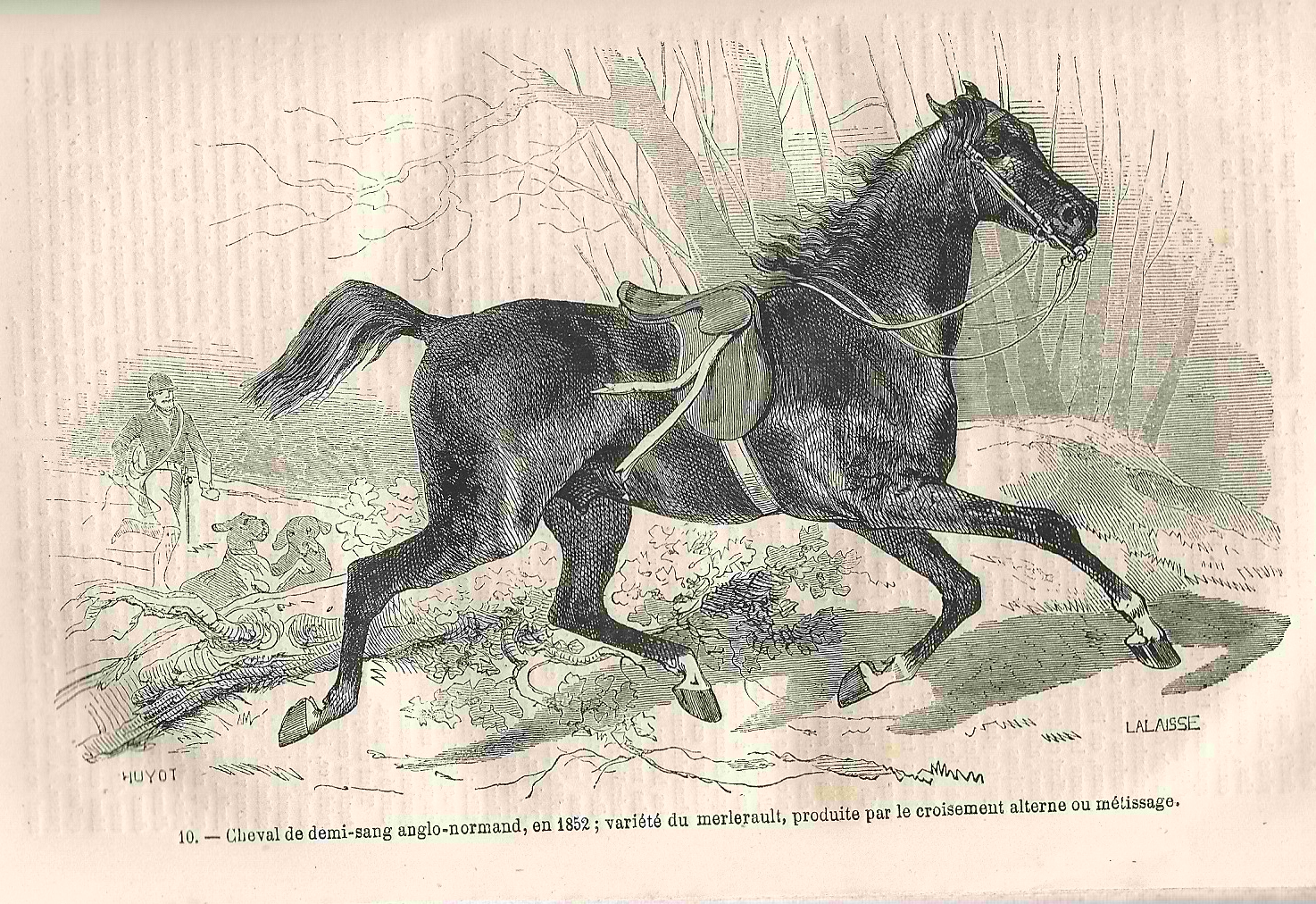
- A Merlerault horse in 1852, in Encyclopédie pratique de l'agriculteur published by Firmin-Didot and Cie, t. 5, 1877.
- Other names: Merlerautin
- Country of origin: France
- Distribution: Le Merlerault
- Use: To ride and tilbury pulling

Traits
- Height: Medium size
- Distinguishing features: A square head, shoulder well defined, short hindquarters, graceful legs.

The Merlerault is a formerly common breed of horse that originated in the canton of Le Merlerault. Bred under the Old Regime, this reputedly elegant half-bred was used to ride and pull tilburies.

== Names ==
Another common name for these horses is "Merlerautin".

The breed is sometimes erroneously referred to as "Mellerauds", notably by M. Cardini, who also claims (incorrectly) that Merlerault horses were once raised semi-wild in the woods.

== History ==
The Merlerault is the oldest known breeding cradle of horses in Normandy. A breeding tradition has existed there for centuries, with secular and religious guilds establishing stud farms as early as the Middle Ages. However, according to Jacques Mulliez, the breed of this name is not that old, despite traditions dating back to the Crusades or the Merovingian kings.

Maximilien de Béthune, Duke of Sully, designated the Le Merlerault region as Normandy's horse production center; this first stud farm was replaced in 1730 by the Haras du Pin.

According to Bernard Denis (2012), Merlerault horses are "probably an artificial breed" created by the nobility from purebred horses. This breed was very popular at the end of the Old Regime. Le Merlerault supplied the nobility with saddle horses in the 17th and 18th centuries.

== Description ==
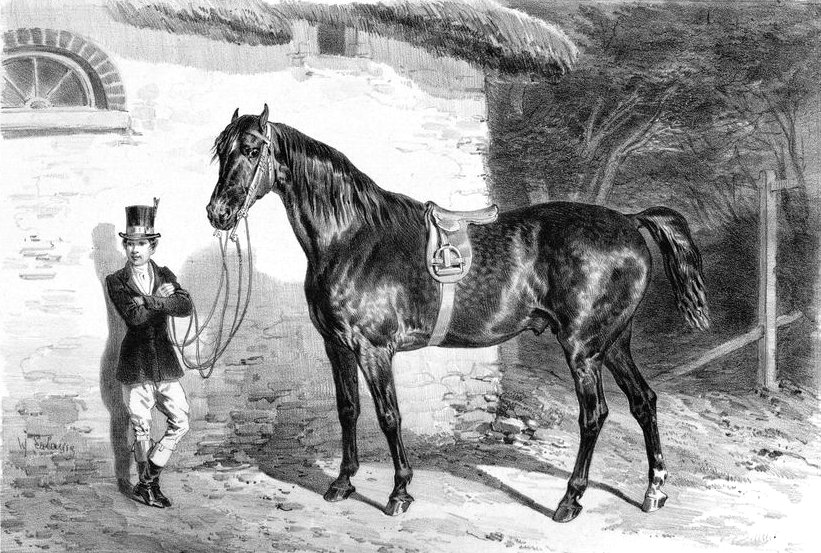
An Anglo-Normand horse from Merlerault in the Atlas statistique de la production des Chevaux en France, 1850.

The Merlerault is an elegant half-breed of medium size, with a square head on a well-set neck. The shoulder is well defined, the hindquarters short, the legs graceful but sometimes a little spindly. The hocks may lack sharpness, and the animal is lightly built, with broad shoulders, agility, and speed.

== Uses ==
The Merlerault horse is particularly suited to ride and tilbury pulling.

== Distribution ==
The breed originated in the Alençon area, particularly in the department of Orne.

In the middle of the 19th century, the Merlerault was the second most numerous horse breed in Normandy after the Cotentin.

== See also ==
- List of French horse breeds

== Bibliography ==
- Denis, Bernard (2012). "Les races de chevaux en France au xviiie siècle. Et les idées relatives à leur amélioration". In Situ (in French) (18). doi:10.4000/insitu.9677.
- Du Hays, Charles (1866). Le Merlerault, ses herbages, ses éleveurs, ses chevaux, et le Haras du Pin-la Plaine d'Alençon-le Mesle-sur-Sarthe (in French). Paris: Librairie Agricole de la Maison Rustique.
- Frémont, Armand (1967). L'Élevage en Normandie : étude géographique (in French). Caen: Presses universitaires de Caen. ISBN 978-2-84133-480-3.
- Gast, Edmond (1889). Le cheval normand et ses origines : situation hippique de la France, étalons nationaux; Orne, Calvados, Manche, différents élevages, généalogies, portraits; courses au trot; remontes militaires; percherons... (in French). Paris: J. Rothschild.
- Mégnin, Jean-Pierre (1895). Le cheval et ses races: histoire des races à travers les siècles et races actuelles (in French). Vincennes Aux bureaux de l'Éleveur.
- Moll, Louis; Gayot, Eugène Nicolas (2018) [1861]. La connaissance générale du cheval : études de zootechnie pratique, avec un atlas de 160 pages et de 103 figures (in French). Didot. ISBN 978-0274430161.
