= Deauville-La Touques Racecourse =

Horse race track in France

Coordinates: 49°21′14″N 0°4′48″E

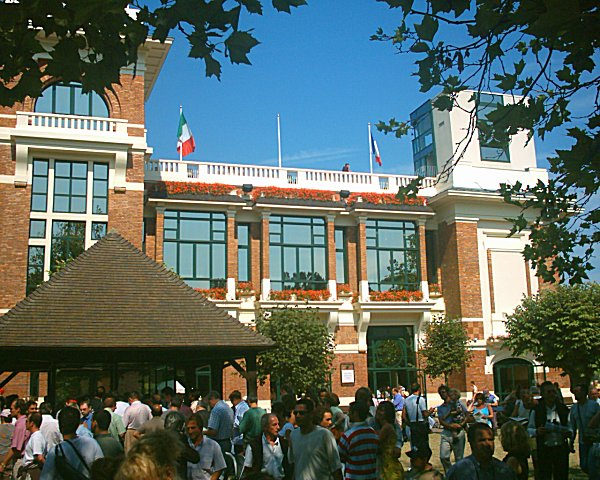
Deauville La Touques racecourse

Hippodrome Deauville-La Touques is a race track for thoroughbred horse racing located in Deauville in the Calvados département, in the Normandy région of France. Originally called Hippodrome de la Touques, it was named for the Touques River that separates the city of Deauville from Trouville-sur-Mer. It was constructed in 1862 by Charles Auguste Louis Joseph, duc de Morny, the half brother of Napoleon III.

The countryside around Deauville is the main horse breeding region in France and home to numerous stud farms.

== Races ==
Group 1:

- Prix Jacques Le Marois
- Prix Jean et Louis Romanet
- Prix Maurice de Gheest
- Prix Morny
- Prix Rothschild
- Prix Jean Prat

Group 2:

- Grand Prix de Deauville
- Prix Guillaume d'Ornano
- Prix Kergorlay
- Prix de Pomone

Group 3:

- Prix de Cabourg
- Prix du Calvados
- Prix Gontaut-Biron
- Prix de Lieurey
- Prix de Meautry
- Prix Minerve
- Prix de la Nonette
- Prix de Psyché
- Prix Quincey
- Prix des Réservoirs
- Prix François Boutin

Listed:

- Prix Yacowlef

== See also ==
- Deauville-Clairefontaine Racecourse
- Horses in Normandy
