= Saint-André-de-Messei =

- Commune
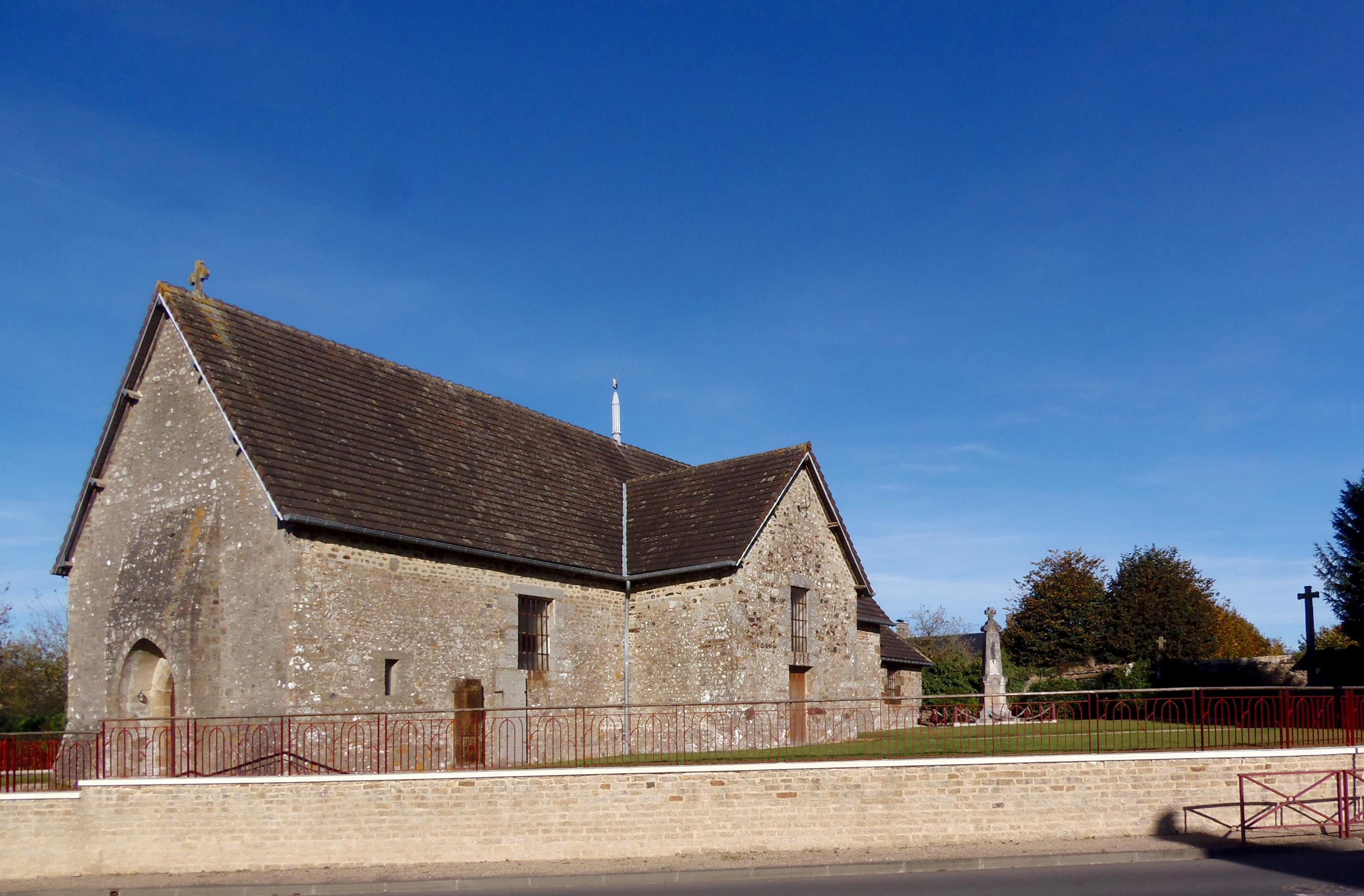
- The church in Saint-André-de-Messei
- Location of Saint-André-de-Messei
- Location within France Location within Normandy
- Coordinates: 48°41′44″N 0°31′14″W
- Country: France
- Region: Normandy
- Department: Orne
- Arrondissement: Argentan
- Canton: La Ferté-Macé
- Intercommunality: CA Flers Agglo

Government
  - Mayor (2020–2026): Jean-Claude Guillemine
- Area^{1}: 14.99 km^{2} (5.79 sq mi)
- Elevation: 201 m (659 ft)
- Highest elevation: 291 m (955 ft)
- Lowest elevation: 198 m (650 ft)
- Population (2023): 518
  - Density: 34.6/km^{2} (89.5/sq mi)
- Time zone: UTC+01:00 (CET)
  - Summer (DST): UTC+02:00 (CEST)
- INSEE/Postal code: 61362 /61440
- ^{1} French Land Register data, which excludes lakes, ponds, glaciers > 1 km^{2} (0.386 sq mi or 247 acres) and river estuaries.

Saint-André-de-Messei (French pronunciation: [sɛ̃.t‿ɑ̃dʁe də mɛsɛ], literally Saint-André of Messei) is a commune in the Orne department in north-western France.

== Geography ==
The commune is made up of the following collection of villages and hamlets, Les Refours, Les Monts, L'Être Gallet, Vircoq and Saint-André-de-Messei.

It is 1,500 hectares (5.8 sq mi) in size. The highest point in the commune is 219 metres (719 ft).

The sole watercourse that flows through the commune is the river Varenne.

== Notable people ==
- René Bansard - (1904 - 1917) was a French archaeologist, who died here.

== See also ==
- Communes of the Orne department
