= Gacé =

- Commune
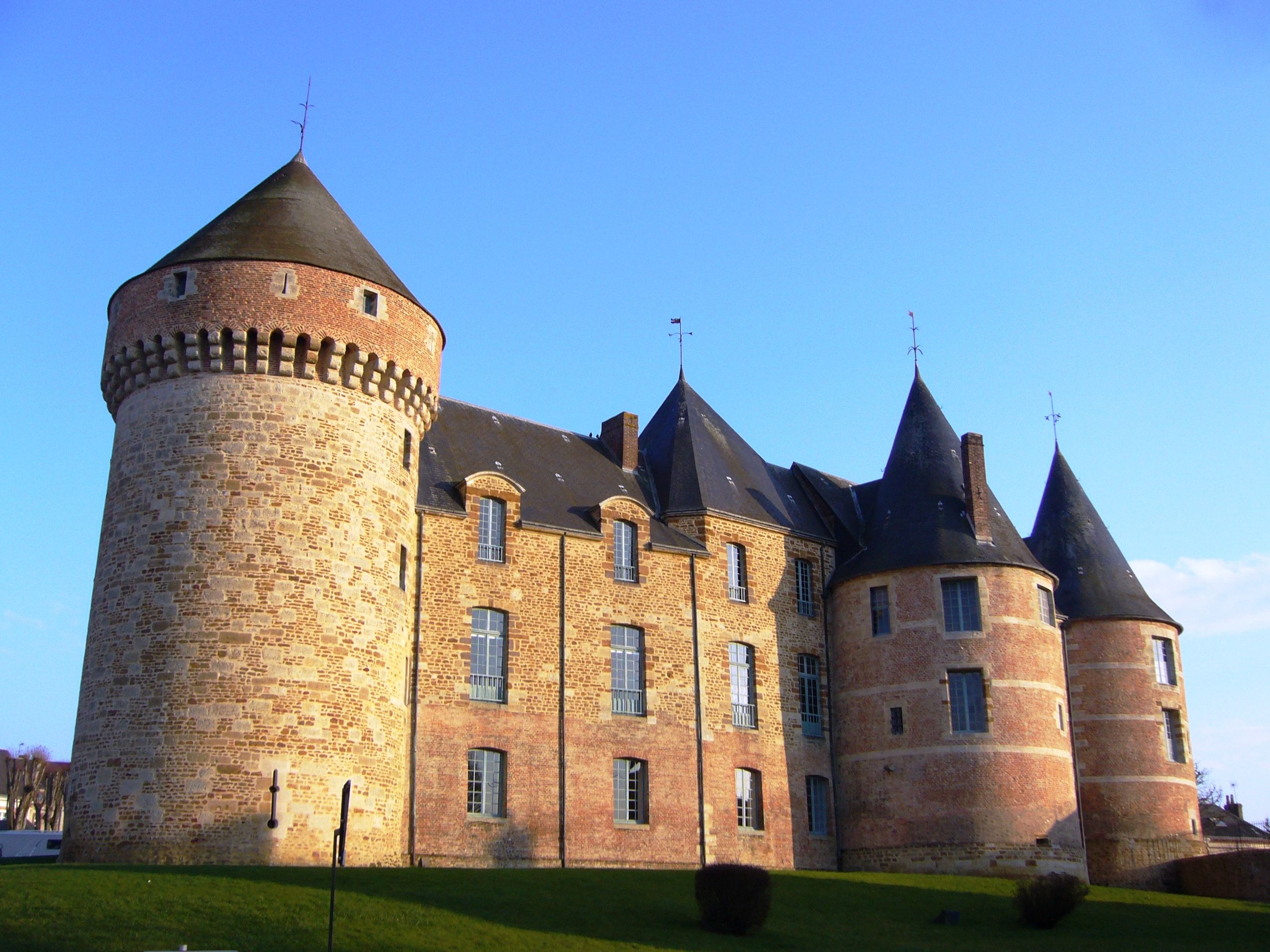
- Gacé Castle (fr. Château de Gacé)
- Location of Gacé
- Location within France Location within Normandy
- Coordinates: 48°47′38″N 0°17′52″E
- Country: France
- Region: Normandy
- Department: Orne
- Arrondissement: Mortagne-au-Perche
- Canton: Vimoutiers
- Intercommunality: Vallées d'Auge et du Merlerault

Government
  - Mayor (2020–2026): Jean Grimbert
- Area^{1}: 6.5 km^{2} (2.5 sq mi)
- Elevation: 186 m (610 ft)
- Highest elevation: 316 m (1,037 ft)
- Lowest elevation: 179 m (587 ft)
- Population (2023): 1,766
  - Density: 270/km^{2} (700/sq mi)
- Time zone: UTC+01:00 (CET)
  - Summer (DST): UTC+02:00 (CEST)
- INSEE/Postal code: 61181 /61230
- Website: www.gace.fr
- ^{1} French Land Register data, which excludes lakes, ponds, glaciers > 1 km^{2} (0.386 sq mi or 247 acres) and river estuaries.

Gacé (French pronunciation: [ɡase]) is a commune in the Orne department in Lower-Normandy, north-western France. The commune is part of the area known as Pays d'Auge.

== Geography ==
The commune is made up of the following collection of villages and hamlets, La Chapelle Mongenouil and Gacé.

The Commune is one of 27 communes that make up the Natura 2000 protected area of Bocages et vergers du sud Pays d'Auge.

The commune has one river, The Touques and a single stream, the Bouillant running through its borders.

== Population ==
Historical population
Year	Pop.	±% p.a.
1968	2,170	—
1975	2,397	+1.43%
1982	2,192	−1.27%
1990	2,247	+0.31%
1999	2,041	−1.06%
2007	2,110	+0.42%
2012	2,031	−0.76%
2017	1,861	−1.73%
2023	1,766	−0.87%
Source: INSEE

== Notable buildings and places ==
- Gacé museum a museum based at Chateau à Gacé that shows a collection of 2,500 minerals, fossils and meteorites.
- The Lady of the Camellias Museum based at the Chateau à Gacé is a museum dedicated to the life of Marie Duplessis.

=== National heritage sites ===
- Château à Gacé a 14th-century chateau listed as a monument in 1968.

== Notable people ==
- Foulques du Merle - (1239 - 1314) was Seigneur of Gacé and Bellou-en-Houlme, and Baron of Le Merlerault, Briouze and Messei.
- Charles Auguste de Goÿon (1647-1729), a French diplomat and soldier who was the Count of Gacé.

== Heraldry ==
Arms of Gacé	The arms of Gacé are blazoned: Argent, two closed towers gules in fess.

== Administration ==
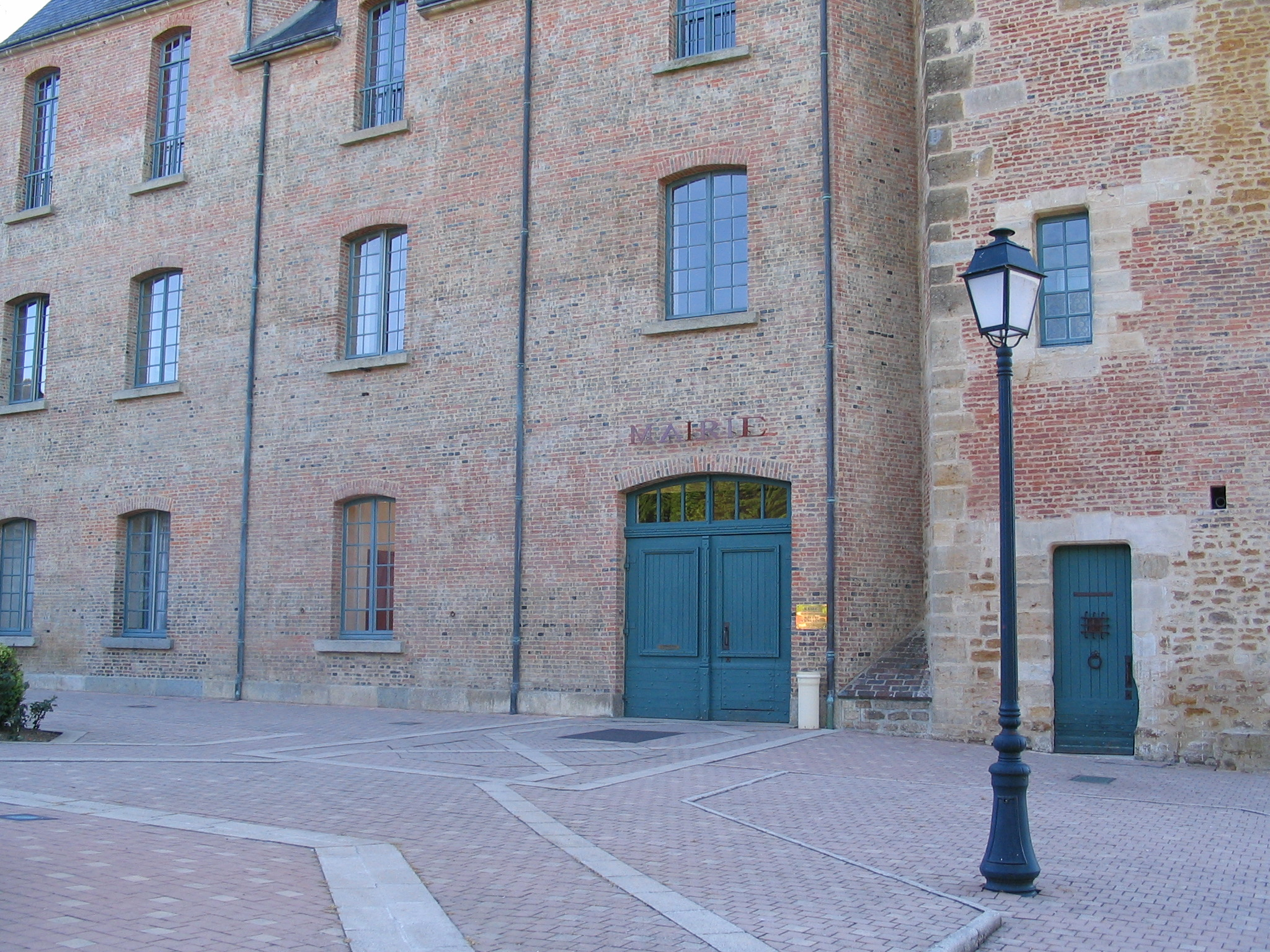
City Hall in the Castle

== Twin towns ==
- Kinross, Perth & Kinross, Scotland

== See also ==
- Communes of the Orne department
- Château de Gacé
