= Émile Deshayes de Marcère =

French politician (1828–1918)

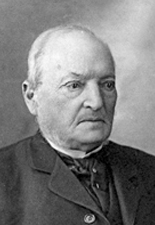
- Émile Deshayes de Marcère
- Born: March 16, 1828; Domfront
- Died: March 26, 1918 (aged 90); Messei
- Resting place: Banvou
- Occupation: Politician

Émile-Louis-Gustave Deshayes de Marcère (16 March 1828 – 26 April 1918) was a French politician.

Marcère was a deputy in the National Assembly from 1871 to 1884. In 1876 and 1878, he was Minister of the Interior, continuing in post for a few weeks in the Waddington ministry of 1879.

In 1884, Marcère was appointed as a senator for life (sénateur inamovible). He was mayor of Messei from 1892 to 1912, where he died in 1918. At his death he was the last surviving senator for life of the Third Republic.
