= Canton of La Ferté-Macé =

Coordinates: 48.59°N 0.36°W

The canton of La Ferté-Macé is an administrative division of the Orne department, northwestern France. Its borders were modified at the French canton reorganisation which came into effect in March 2015. Its seat is in La Ferté-Macé.

It consists of the following communes:

1. Banvou
2. Beauvain
3. Bellou-en-Houlme
4. La Coulonche
5. Dompierre
6. Échalou
7. La Ferrière-aux-Étangs
8. La Ferté-Macé
9. Lonlay-le-Tesson
10. Messei
11. Les Monts d'Andaine
12. Saint-André-de-Messei
13. Saires-la-Verrerie
