= Banvou =

- Commune
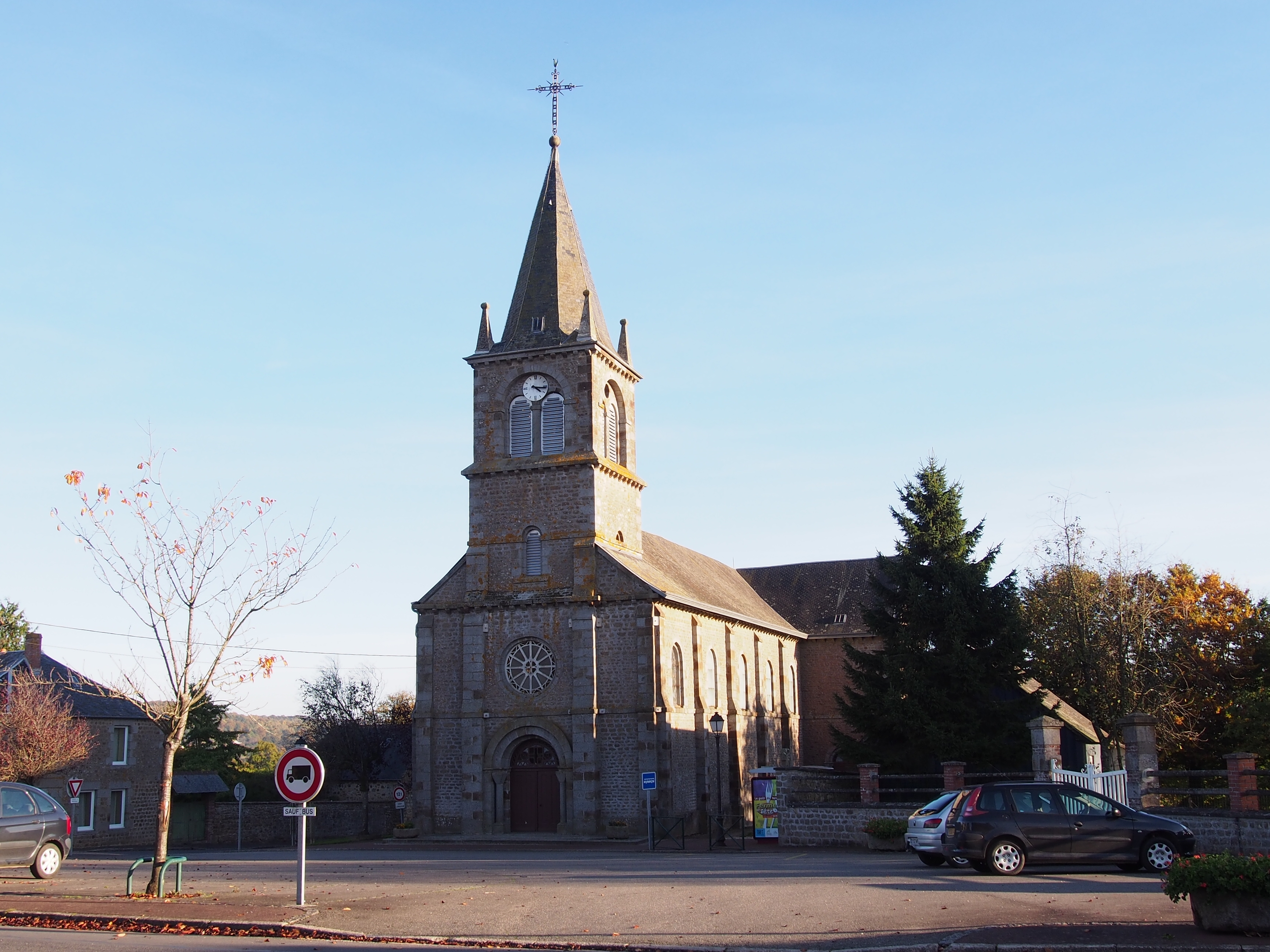
- The church in Banvou
- Location of Banvou
- Location within France Location within Normandy
- Coordinates: 48°39′57″N 0°33′06″W
- Country: France
- Region: Normandy
- Department: Orne
- Arrondissement: Argentan
- Canton: La Ferté-Macé
- Intercommunality: CA Flers Agglo

Government
  - Mayor (2020–2026): Jean-Louis Pellerin
- Area^{1}: 12.98 km^{2} (5.01 sq mi)
- Elevation: 187 m (614 ft)
- Highest elevation: 259 m (850 ft)
- Lowest elevation: 173 m (568 ft)
- Population (2023): 630
  - Density: 49/km^{2} (130/sq mi)
- Time zone: UTC+01:00 (CET)
  - Summer (DST): UTC+02:00 (CEST)
- INSEE/Postal code: 61024 /61450
- ^{1} French Land Register data, which excludes lakes, ponds, glaciers > 1 km^{2} (0.386 sq mi or 247 acres) and river estuaries.

Banvou (French pronunciation: [bɑ̃vu]) is a commune in the Orne department in northwestern France.

== Geography ==
The commune is made up of the following collection of villages and hamlets, Mesnil Clou, La Rousselière, Pic Louvette, Meslé, L'Être Amiard, Le Pont, Le Plessis, La Lande, La Ribardière, La Gaudinière and Banvou.

It is 1,300 hectares (5.0 sq mi) in size. The highest point in the commune is 226 metres (741 ft).

The Halouze and the Varenne are the two rivers, running through this commune.

== Population ==
Historical population
Year	Pop.	±% p.a.
1968	488	—
1975	436	−1.60%
1982	418	−0.60%
1990	441	+0.67%
1999	456	+0.37%
2007	601	+3.51%
2012	656	+1.77%
2017	615	−1.28%
2023	630	+0.40%
Source: INSEE

== Notable people ==
- Émile Deshayes de Marcère (1828–1918) - last surviving senator for life of the Third Republic is buried here.

== See also ==
- Communes of the Orne department
