= Bellou-en-Houlme =

- Commune
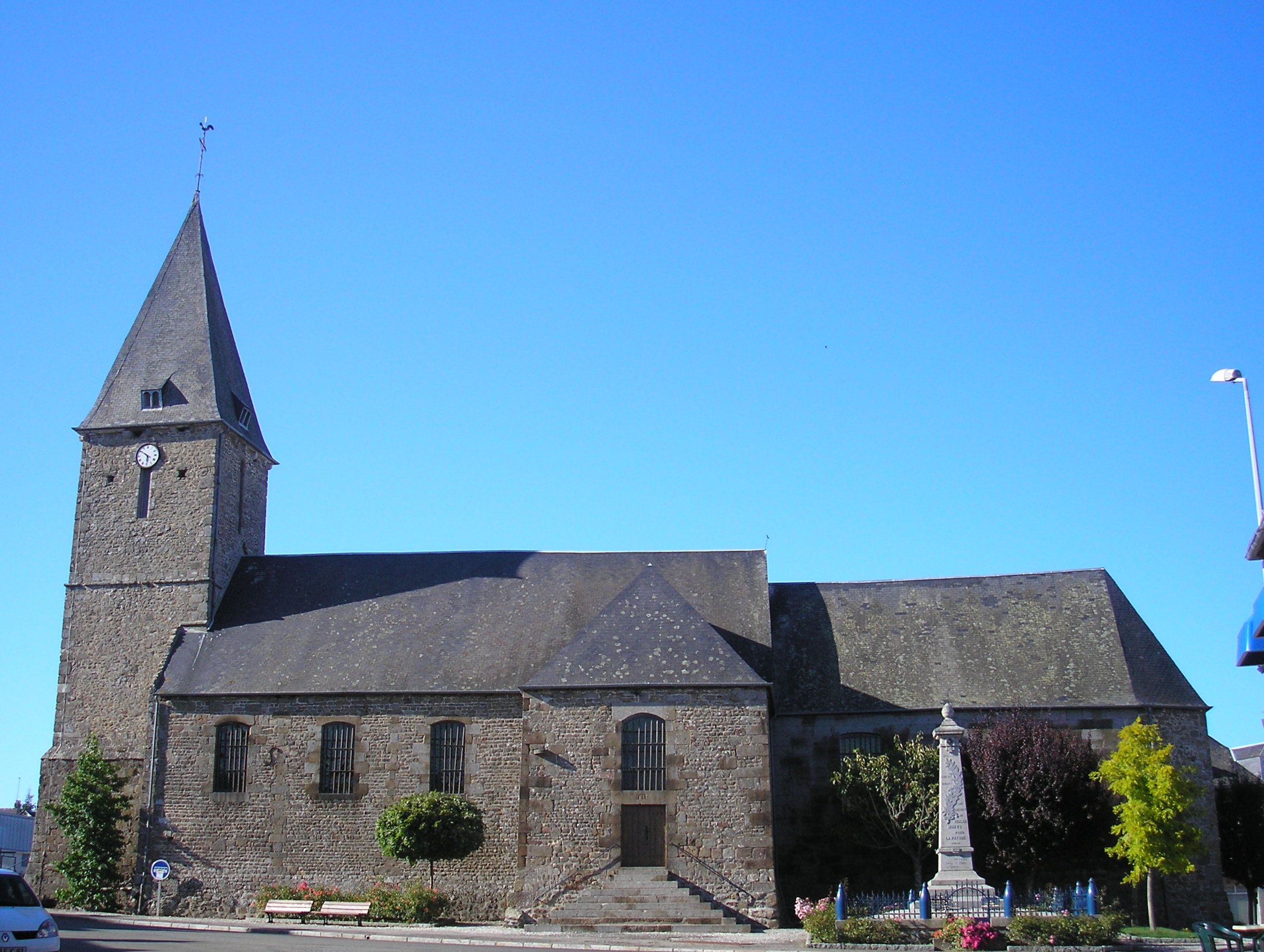
- The church in Bellou-en-Houlme
- Location of Bellou-en-Houlme
- Location within France Location within Normandy
- Coordinates: 48°41′29″N 0°26′32″W
- Country: France
- Region: Normandy
- Department: Orne
- Arrondissement: Argentan
- Canton: La Ferté-Macé
- Intercommunality: CA Flers Agglo

Government
  - Mayor (2020–2026): Jean-Marie Gaudin
- Area^{1}: 38.73 km^{2} (14.95 sq mi)
- Elevation: 221 m (725 ft)
- Highest elevation: 332 m (1,089 ft)
- Lowest elevation: 202 m (663 ft)
- Population (2023): 1,024
  - Density: 26.44/km^{2} (68.48/sq mi)
- Time zone: UTC+01:00 (CET)
  - Summer (DST): UTC+02:00 (CEST)
- INSEE/Postal code: 61040 /61220
- ^{1} French Land Register data, which excludes lakes, ponds, glaciers > 1 km^{2} (0.386 sq mi or 247 acres) and river estuaries.

Bellou-en-Houlme is a commune in the Orne department in northwestern France.

== Geography ==
The commune is made up of the following collection of villages and hamlets, La Forêterie,Laubesnière, Le Val du Breuil, La Longrais,Le Clos,Le Pont and Bellou-en-Houlme.

There are six watercourses that traverse through the commune, two rivers The Val du Breuil, and The Gine, in addition to four streams. The streams are the Grand Ros, La Prevostiere, the Loget, and La Source Philippe.

Bellou-en-Houlme also has the largest marsh in the Orne department, shared with Briouze at 167.41 Ha, called the Grand-Hazé.

== Population ==
Historical population
Year	Pop.	±% p.a.
1968	1,072	—
1975	926	−2.07%
1982	961	+0.53%
1990	912	−0.65%
1999	954	+0.50%
2007	1,063	+1.36%
2012	1,127	+1.18%
2017	1,117	−0.18%
2023	1,024	−1.44%
Source: INSEE

== Points of Interest ==
Grand-Hazé is a 500 acres of Marshland that has been under the protection of the Natura 2000 since 2002, that is shared with Briouze. The Marshland features Camargue horses and Highland cattle.

=== National heritage sites ===
The Commune has one buildings listed as a Monument historique, which is the Château de Dieufit, a farm house built in 1862, and listed in 2012.

== Notable people ==
- Foulques du Merle - (1239 - 1314) was Seigneur of Gacé and Bellou-en-Houlme, and Baron of Le Merlerault, Briouze and Messei.

== Twin towns – sister cities ==
Bellou-en-Houlme is twinned with:

- Wehretal, Germany

== See also ==
- Communes of the Orne department
