= Échalou =

- Commune
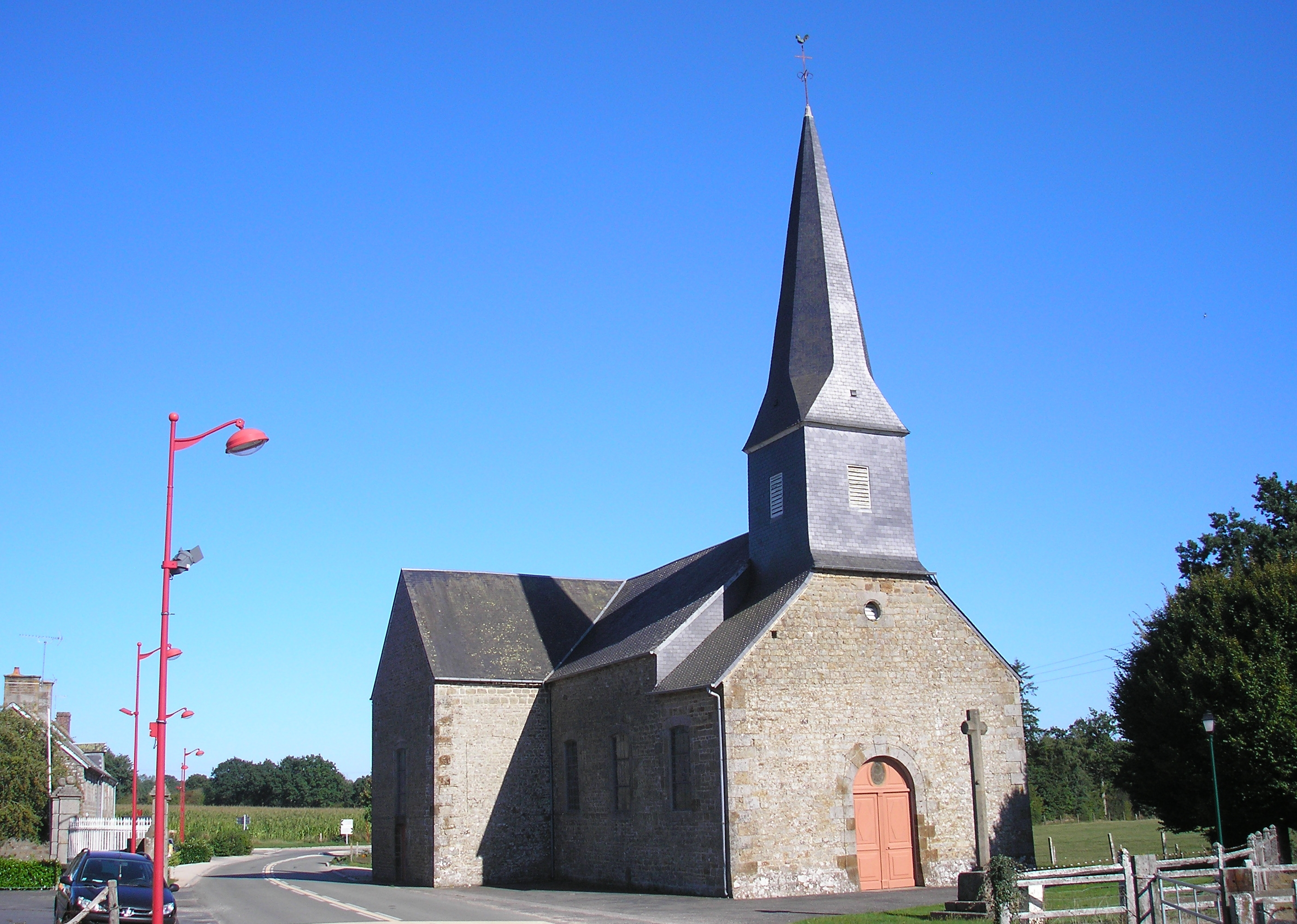
- The church in Échalou
- Location of Échalou
- Location within France Location within Normandy
- Coordinates: 48°43′43″N 0°29′31″W
- Country: France
- Region: Normandy
- Department: Orne
- Arrondissement: Argentan
- Canton: La Ferté-Macé
- Intercommunality: CA Flers Agglo

Government
  - Mayor (2020–2026): Claude Gasnier
- Area^{1}: 5.59 km^{2} (2.16 sq mi)
- Elevation: 217 m (712 ft)
- Highest elevation: 237 m (778 ft)
- Lowest elevation: 204 m (669 ft)
- Population (2023): 319
  - Density: 57.1/km^{2} (148/sq mi)
- Time zone: UTC+01:00 (CET)
  - Summer (DST): UTC+02:00 (CEST)
- INSEE/Postal code: 61149 /61440
- ^{1} French Land Register data, which excludes lakes, ponds, glaciers > 1 km^{2} (0.386 sq mi or 247 acres) and river estuaries.

Échalou (French pronunciation: [eʃalu]) is a commune in the Orne department in north-western France.

== Geography ==
The commune is made up of the following collection of villages and hamlets, Les Mézerets,La Foucaudière, La Crilloire, La Graindorgère and Échalou.

There are 2 watercourses that traverse through the commune, the river Varenne and a stream called the Loget.

== See also ==
- Communes of the Orne department
