= La Ferrière-aux-Étangs =

- Commune
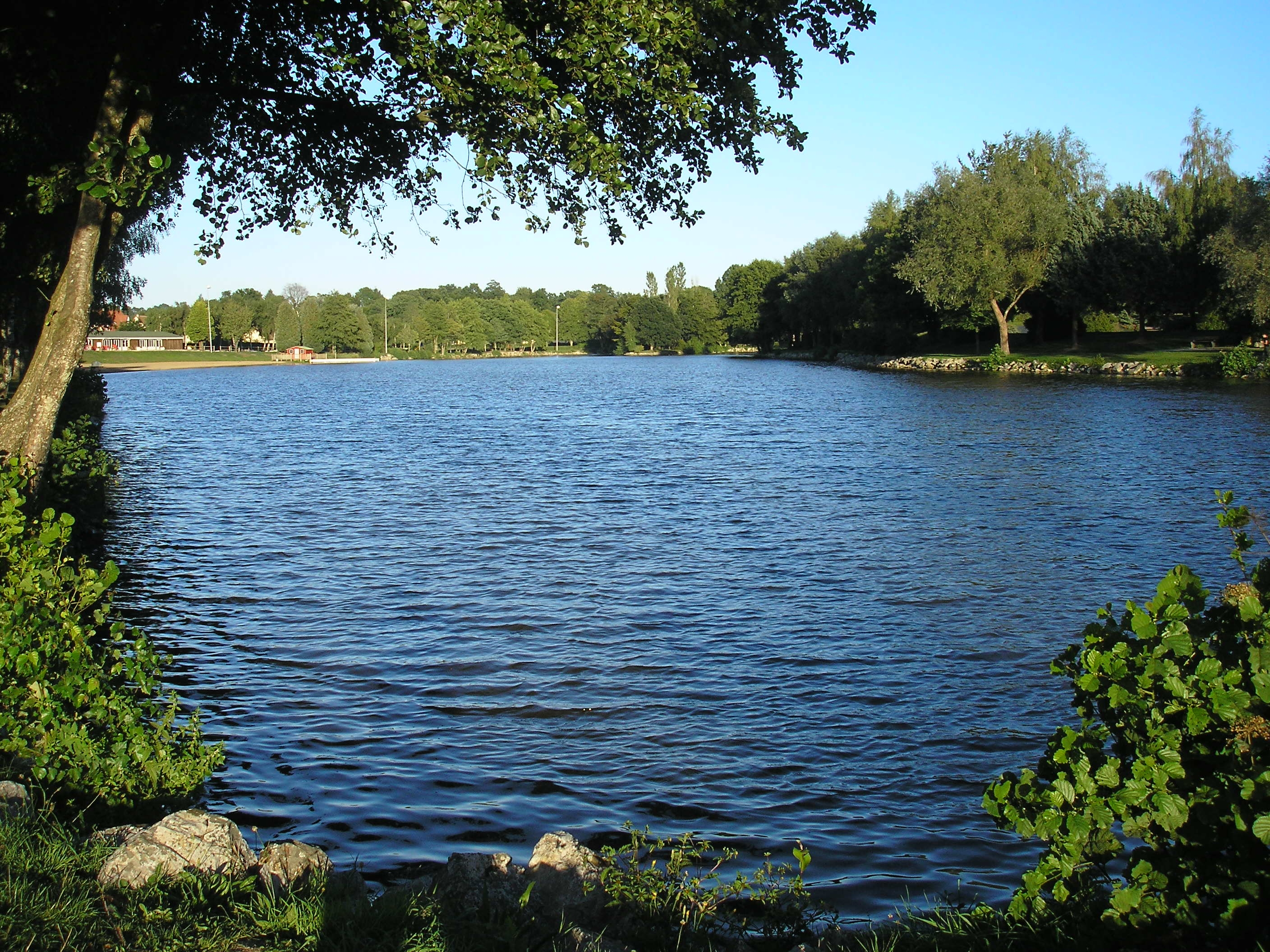
- The lake in La Ferrière-aux-Étangs

- Coat of arms
- Location of La Ferrière-aux-Étangs
- Location within France Location within Normandy
- Coordinates: 48°39′49″N 0°31′04″W
- Country: France
- Region: Normandy
- Department: Orne
- Arrondissement: Argentan
- Canton: La Ferté-Macé
- Intercommunality: CA Flers Agglo

Government
  - Mayor (2020–2026): Vincent Beaumont
- Area^{1}: 10.93 km^{2} (4.22 sq mi)
- Highest elevation: 312 m (1,024 ft)
- Lowest elevation: 187 m (614 ft)
- Population (2023): 1,506
  - Density: 137.8/km^{2} (356.9/sq mi)
- Time zone: UTC+01:00 (CET)
  - Summer (DST): UTC+02:00 (CEST)
- INSEE/Postal code: 61163 /61450
- ^{1} French Land Register data, which excludes lakes, ponds, glaciers > 1 km^{2} (0.386 sq mi or 247 acres) and river estuaries.

La Ferrière-aux-Étangs (French pronunciation: [la fɛʁjɛʁ o.z‿etɑ̃]) is a commune in the Orne department in north-western France.

== Geography ==
The commune is made up of the following collection of villages and hamlets, Sainte-Anne, La Noé, Les Landes, Les Castors, Le Gué Plat and La Ferrière-aux-Étangs.

It is 1,090 hectares (4.2 sq mi) in size. The highest point in the commune is 302 metres (991 ft).

The commune is within the Normandie-Maine Regional Natural Park.

The Vee river is the major watercourse running through this area.

== Notable buildings and places ==
- Le Mont Brûlé is a 302m sandstone hill overlooking the town. On top of the hill is a collection of works, including a replica of the Lourdes grotto.

== Twin towns – sister cities ==
La Ferrière-aux-Étangs is twinned with:

- Wehretal, Germany

== See also ==
- Communes of the Orne department
- Parc naturel régional Normandie-Maine
