= Briouze =

- Commune
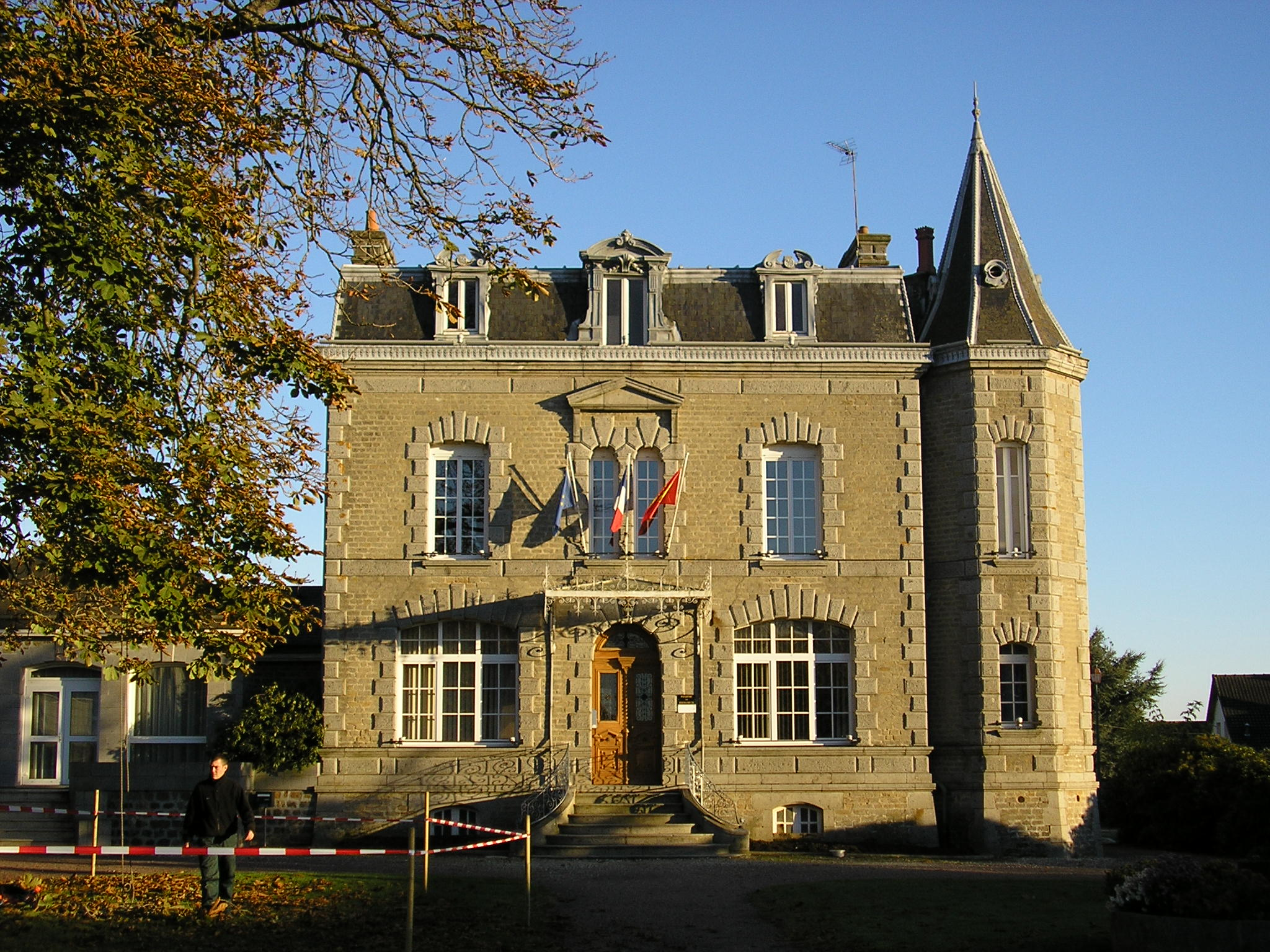
- The town hall in Briouze

- Coat of arms
- Location of Briouze
- Location within France Location within Normandy
- Coordinates: 48°42′00″N 0°21′57″W
- Country: France
- Region: Normandy
- Department: Orne
- Arrondissement: Argentan
- Canton: Athis-Val de Rouvre
- Intercommunality: CA Flers Agglo

Government
  - Mayor (2020–2026): Jacques Fortis
- Area^{1}: 17.15 km^{2} (6.62 sq mi)
- Elevation: 212 m (696 ft)
- Highest elevation: 254 m (833 ft)
- Lowest elevation: 197 m (646 ft)
- Population (2023): 1,512
  - Density: 88.16/km^{2} (228.3/sq mi)
- Time zone: UTC+01:00 (CET)
  - Summer (DST): UTC+02:00 (CEST)
- INSEE/Postal code: 61063 /61220
- ^{1} French Land Register data, which excludes lakes, ponds, glaciers > 1 km^{2} (0.386 sq mi or 247 acres) and river estuaries.

Briouze (French pronunciation: [bʁijuz]) is a commune in the Orne department of Normandy in northwestern France. It is considered the capital of the pays d'Houlme at the western end of the Orne in the Norman bocage.

William de Braose, First Lord of Bramber (Guillaume de Briouze) was granted lands in England after the Norman conquest and used his wealth to build a priory in his home town.

The name Briouze probably comes from an older Norman form of the word "boue", or "mud".

== Geography ==
The commune is made up of the following collection of villages and hamlets, La Bougonnière,La Grivagère, Saint-Gervais and Briouze. The commune is spread over an area of 17.15 square kilometres (4,240 acres) with a maximum altitude of 254 metres (833 ft 4 in) and minimum of 197 metres (646 ft 4 in)

The commune has eleven watercourses running through it, the rivers Rouvre and the Val du Breuil, plus nine streams. The nine streams are known as the Maufy, the Roussieres, Grand Ros, la Haie, the Arthan, la Prevostiere, Le Bel Argent, the Lange and la Source Philippe.

Briouze also has the largest marsh in the Orne department, shared with Bellou-en-Houlme at 167.41 Ha, called the Grand-Hazé.

=== Land distribution ===
The 2018 CORINE Land Cover assessment shows the vast majority of the land in the commune, 55% (495 hectares (1,220 acres)) is meadows. The rest of the land is arable land at 29%, urbanised areas at 7%, heterogeneous agricultural land at 5% and wetlands at 3% (55 hectares (140 acres)).

=== Climate ===
Briouze has an oceanic climate with mild winters and temperate summers.

Climate data for Briouze (1991–2012 normals, extremes 1974–2012)
Month	Jan	Feb	Mar	Apr	May	Jun	Jul	Aug	Sep	Oct	Nov	Dec	Year
Record high °C (°F)	14.8 (58.6)	18.8 (65.8)	23.0 (73.4)	28.2 (82.8)	30.8 (87.4)	35.8 (96.4)	36.0 (96.8)	39.0 (102.2)	32.8 (91.0)	29.2 (84.6)	19.5 (67.1)	15.5 (59.9)	39.0 (102.2)
Mean daily maximum °C (°F)	7.2 (45.0)	8.5 (47.3)	11.8 (53.2)	14.7 (58.5)	18.5 (65.3)	21.7 (71.1)	23.6 (74.5)	23.9 (75.0)	20.3 (68.5)	15.6 (60.1)	10.7 (51.3)	7.3 (45.1)	15.3 (59.5)
Daily mean °C (°F)	4.6 (40.3)	5.1 (41.2)	7.5 (45.5)	9.7 (49.5)	13.3 (55.9)	16.1 (61.0)	17.9 (64.2)	18.1 (64.6)	14.9 (58.8)	11.7 (53.1)	7.6 (45.7)	4.6 (40.3)	10.9 (51.6)
Mean daily minimum °C (°F)	2.0 (35.6)	1.7 (35.1)	3.2 (37.8)	4.6 (40.3)	8.0 (46.4)	10.6 (51.1)	12.3 (54.1)	12.3 (54.1)	9.6 (49.3)	7.8 (46.0)	4.6 (40.3)	1.9 (35.4)	6.6 (43.9)
Record low °C (°F)	−23.5 (−10.3)	−14.5 (5.9)	−9.5 (14.9)	−5.8 (21.6)	−3.5 (25.7)	−0.2 (31.6)	3.5 (38.3)	1.2 (34.2)	−0.9 (30.4)	−6.0 (21.2)	−8.5 (16.7)	−12 (10)	−23.5 (−10.3)
Average precipitation mm (inches)	99.9 (3.93)	77.3 (3.04)	66.7 (2.63)	60.9 (2.40)	70.9 (2.79)	55.5 (2.19)	57.6 (2.27)	64.2 (2.53)	64.7 (2.55)	92.7 (3.65)	94.9 (3.74)	115.2 (4.54)	920.5 (36.24)
Average precipitation days (≥ 1.0 mm)	14.4	12.3	11.5	10.1	9.6	8.6	8.4	9.2	9.4	13.1	14.2	15.7	136.4
Source: Meteociel

== Population ==
Historical population
Year	Pop.	±% p.a.
1968	1,685	—
1975	1,703	+0.15%
1982	1,690	−0.11%
1990	1,658	−0.24%
1999	1,620	−0.26%
2007	1,600	−0.16%
2012	1,565	−0.44%
2017	1,534	−0.40%
2023	1,512	−0.24%
Source: INSEE

== Heraldry ==
Arms of Briouze	The arms of Briouze are blazoned : Azure, in base 2 clasped hands Or, and in chief a bird argent on waves couped sable from which issue reeds argent; all within a bordure argent semy of lozenges gules and ermine spots sable.

== Transport ==
Briouze station has rail connections to Argentan, Paris and Granville.

== Points of Interest ==
Grand-Hazé is a 500 acres of Marshland that has been under the protection of the Natura 2000 since 2002, that is shared with Bellou-en-Houlme. The Marshland features Camargue horses and Highland cattle.

=== National heritage sites ===
- Saint-Gervais Chapel is an eleventh century chapel built between 1080 and 1093 by Guillaume de Briouze. It was listed as a Monument historique in 1975.
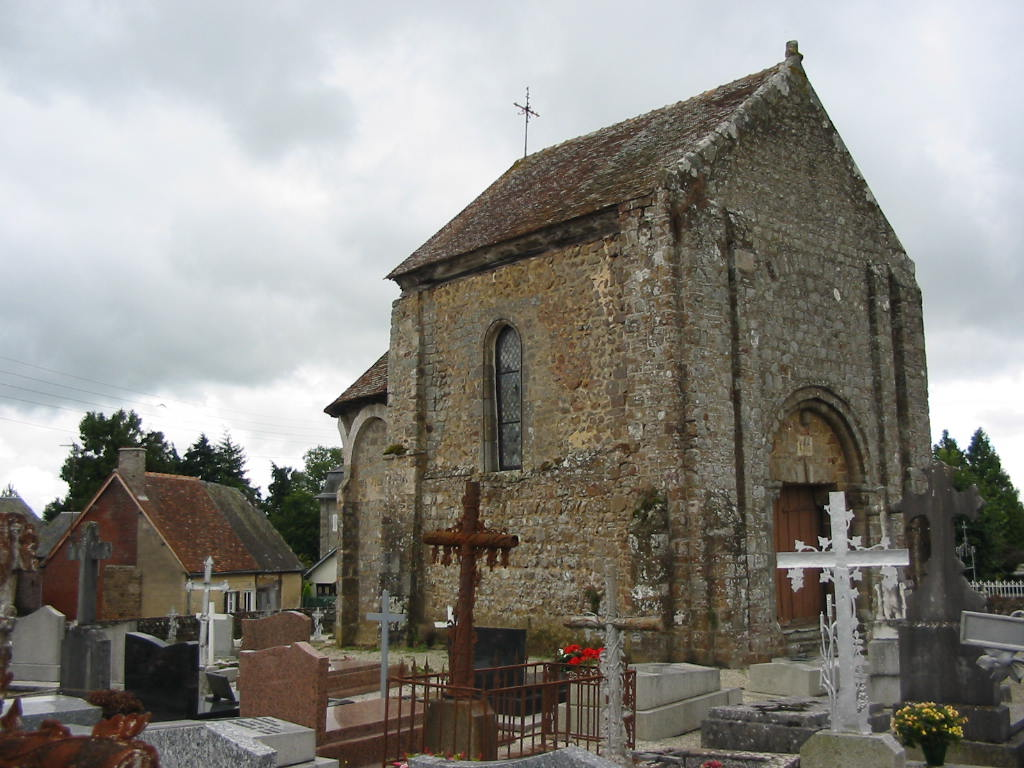
Chapel of Saint-Gervais

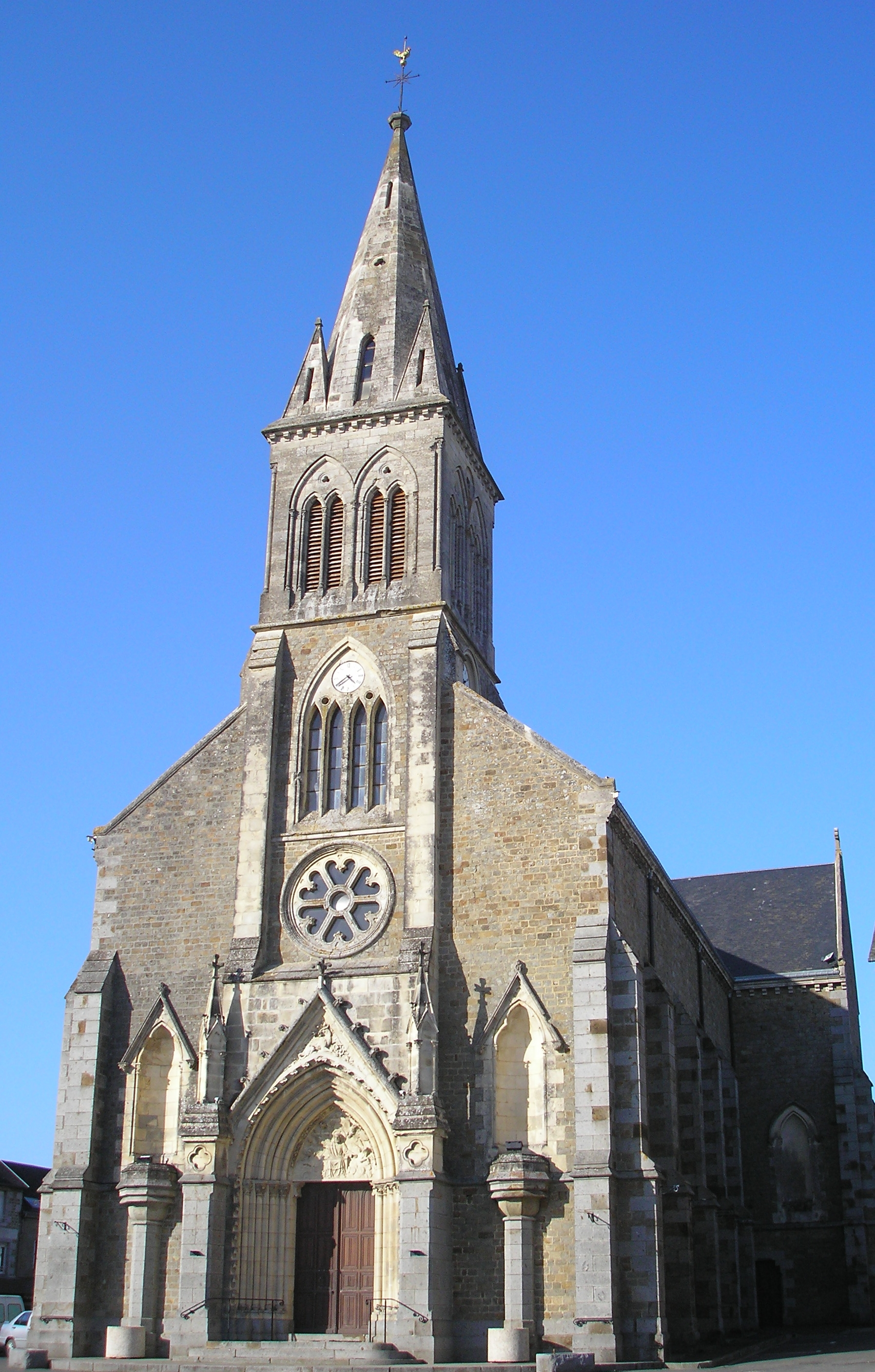
Briouze Church

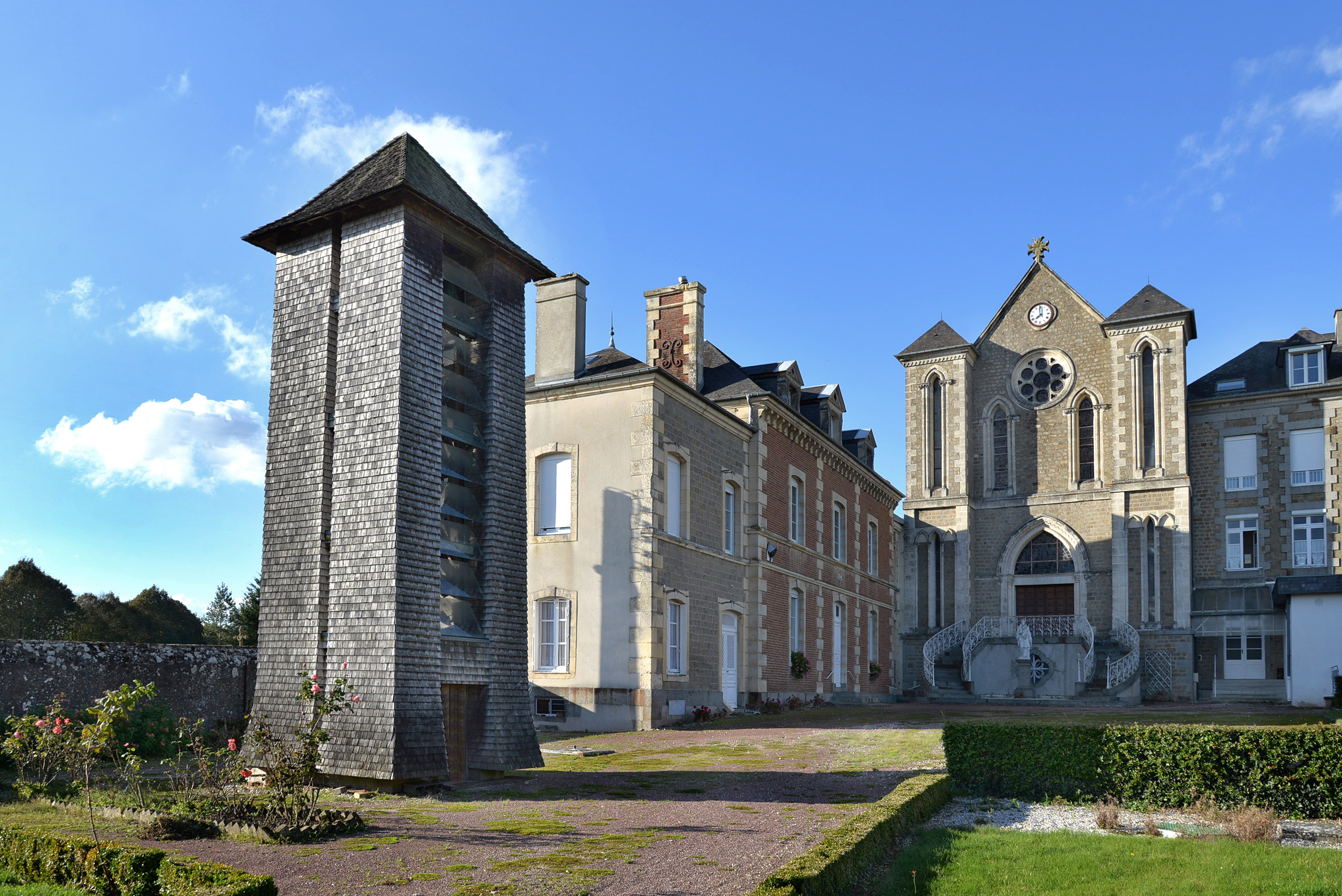
Chapel of the community of the Sisters of Notre-Dame de Briouze

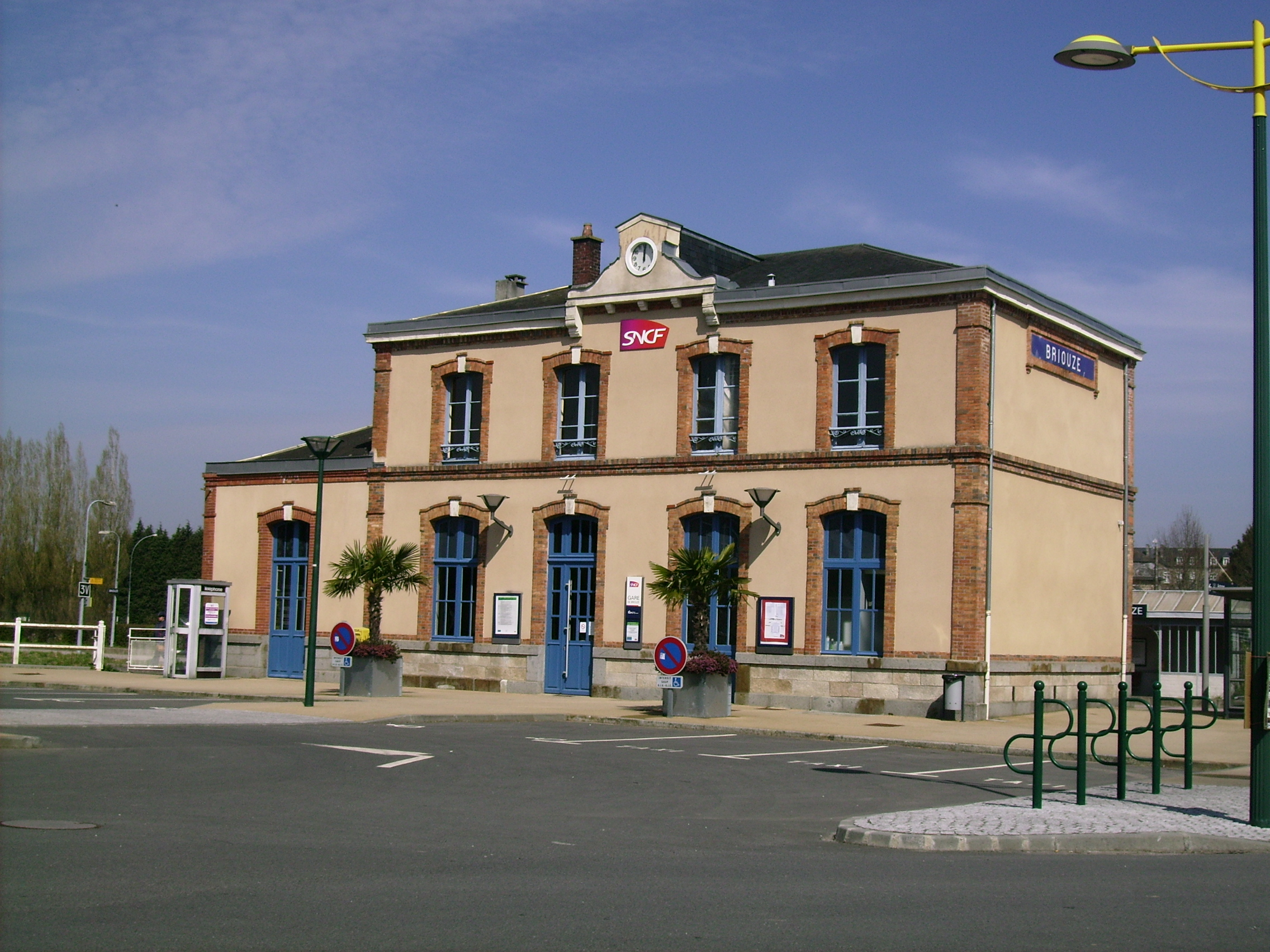
Briouze station

== Culture ==
Since 1996, each year the commune hosts a music festival, Festival Art Sonic at the end of July. The festival attracts about 20,000 people featuring Contemporary music.

== Notable people ==
- William de Braose, 1st Lord of Bramber (died 1093-1096) lord of Briouze.
- Foulques du Merle - (1239 - 1314) was Seigneur of Gacé and Bellou-en-Houlme, and Baron of Le Merlerault, Briouze and Messei.
- Alexandre Bisson - (1848 - 1912) French playwright, vaudeville creator, and novelist was born here.

== Twin towns – sister cities ==
Briouze is twinned with:

- Beverungen, Germany

== See also ==
- Communes of the Orne department
