= Saires-la-Verrerie =

- Commune
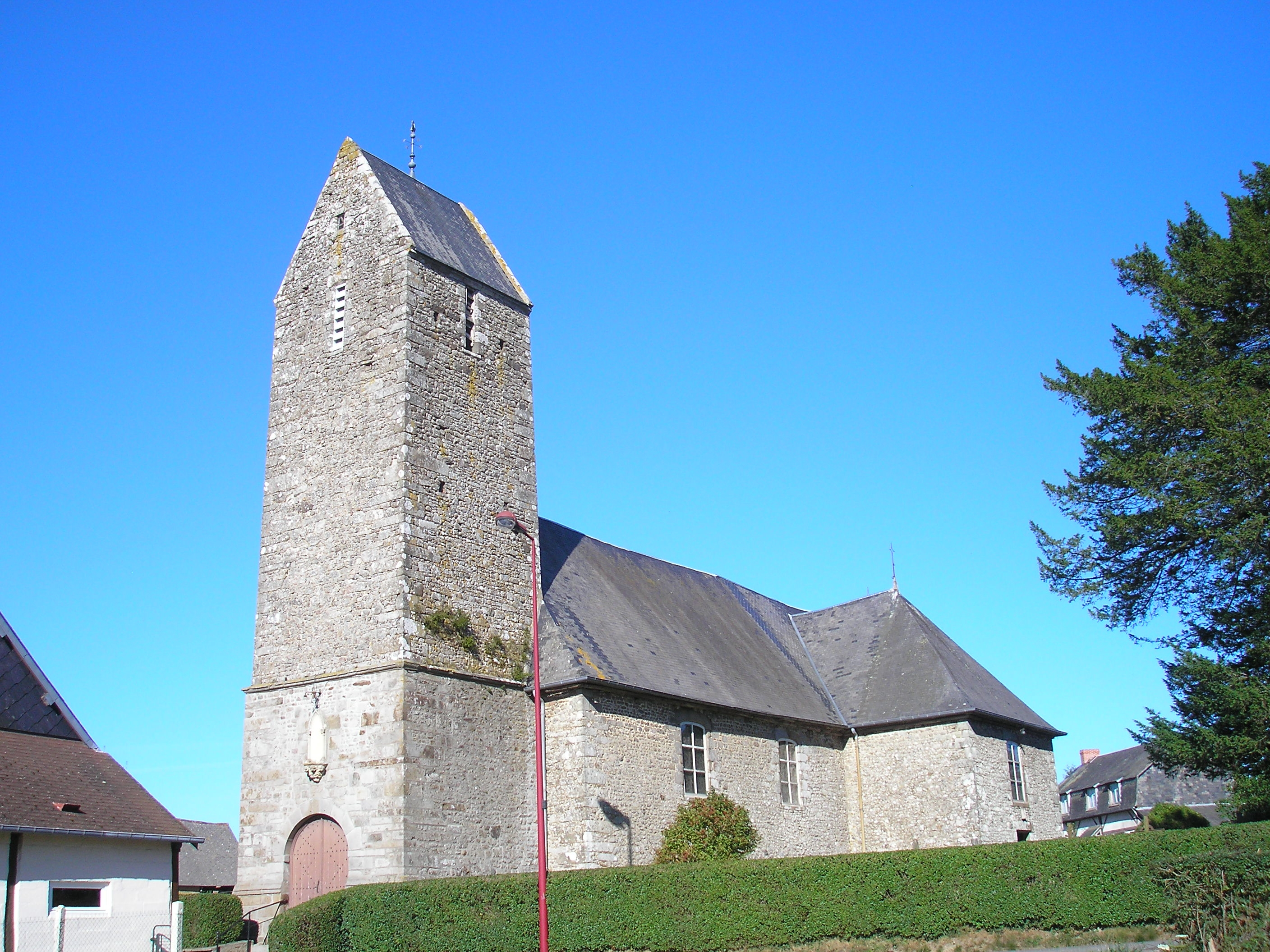
- The church in Saires-la-Verrerie
- Location of Saires-la-Verrerie
- Location within France Location within Normandy
- Coordinates: 48°41′14″N 0°29′42″W
- Country: France
- Region: Normandy
- Department: Orne
- Arrondissement: Argentan
- Canton: La Ferté-Macé
- Intercommunality: CA Flers Agglo

Government
  - Mayor (2020–2026): Charlie Letétrel
- Area^{1}: 7.88 km^{2} (3.04 sq mi)
- Elevation: 224 m (735 ft)
- Highest elevation: 298 m (978 ft)
- Lowest elevation: 208 m (682 ft)
- Population (2023): 295
  - Density: 37.4/km^{2} (97.0/sq mi)
- Time zone: UTC+01:00 (CET)
  - Summer (DST): UTC+02:00 (CEST)
- INSEE/Postal code: 61459 /61220
- ^{1} French Land Register data, which excludes lakes, ponds, glaciers > 1 km^{2} (0.386 sq mi or 247 acres) and river estuaries.

Saires-la-Verrerie (French pronunciation: [sɛʁ la vɛʁ.ʁi]) is a commune in the Orne department in north-western France.

== Geography ==
The commune is made up of the following collection of villages and hamlets, Varennes, Maison Oger and Saires-la-Verrerie.

It is 790 hectares (3.1 sq mi) in size. The highest point in the commune is 235 metres (771 ft).

== Twin towns – sister cities ==
Saires-la-Verrerie is twinned with:

- Wehretal, Germany

== See also ==
- Communes of the Orne department
