= René Bansard =

French archaeologist (1904–1971)

- Born: October 20, 1904; Grandcamp-Maisy
- Died: November 26, 1971 (aged 67); Saint-André-de-Messei
- Occupation: Archaeologist

René Bansard (1904–1971) was a French archaeologist.

== Background ==
He was born in 1904 to a merchant in Grandcamp-Maisy. He died in 1971 in Saint-André-de-Messei.
