= Foulques du Merle =

- Born: 1239
- Died: 1314 (aged 74–75)
- Known for: Marshal of France

The arms of Foulques du Merle.

Foulques or Foucaud du Merle (died 1314) was a Marshal of France. He was Seigneur of Gacé and Bellou-en-Houlme, and Baron of Le Merlerault, Briouze and Messei.

Du Merle was the son of Guillaume VI du Merle and Marie de Nollent. He served Philip III and Philip IV as a knight banneret. In 1302 he was made Marshal of France by Philip IV following the deaths of Simon de Melun and Guy I of Clermont at the Battle of the Golden Spurs, in which du Merle had also fought. In June 1303 du Merle led a force of 1,400 soldiers to bolster the defenders of Tournai. He fought alongside the king at the Battle of Mons-en-Pévèle in 1304 and following the battle negotiated for France with Philip of Chieti. From 1311 to 1312 he participated in the Council of Vienne on behalf of the French king. Du Merle died in 1314 while leading the French army in Flanders.
