= Lonlay-le-Tesson =

- Commune
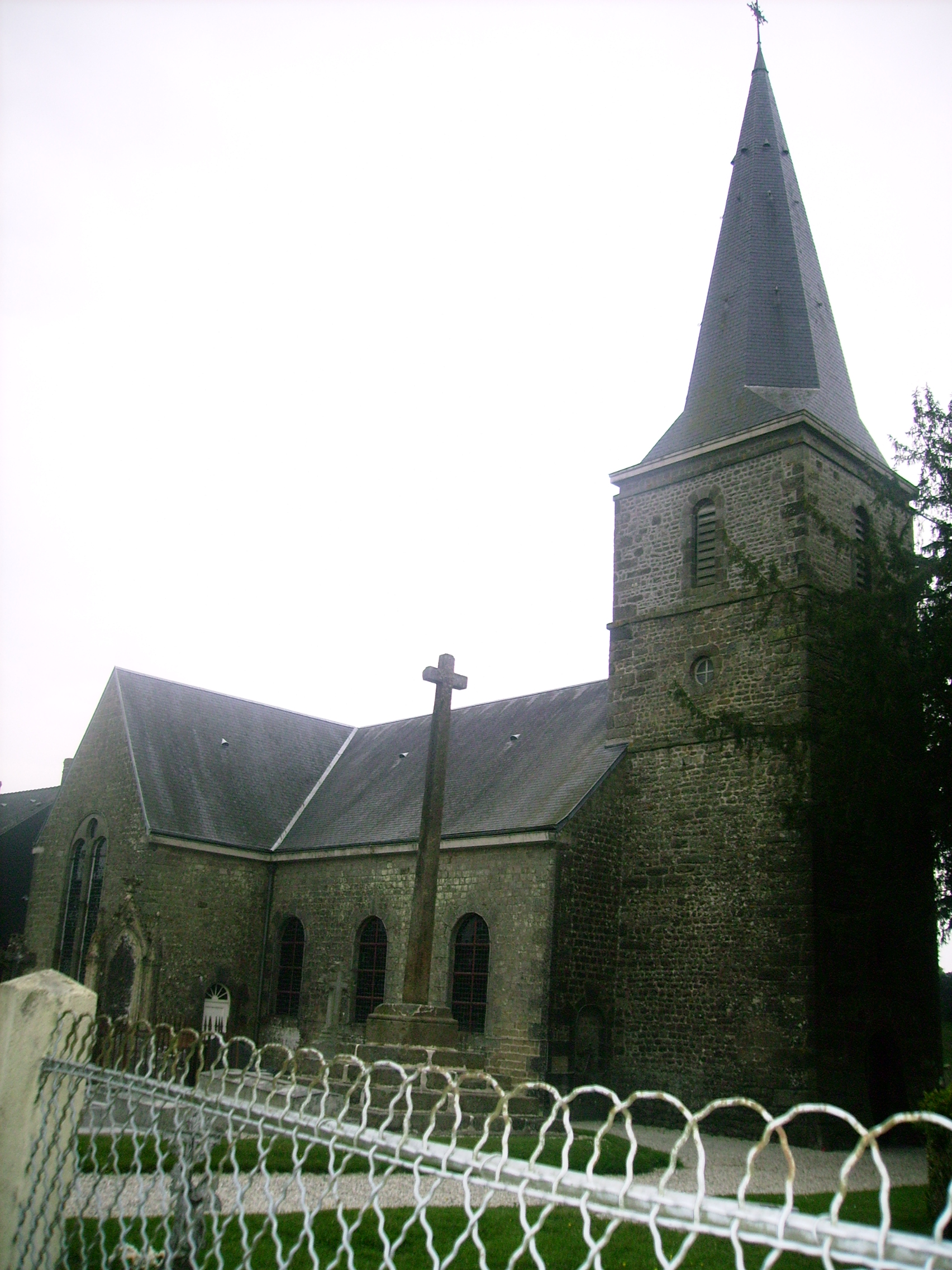
- The church in Lonlay-le-Tesson
- Location of Lonlay-le-Tesson
- Location within France Location within Normandy
- Coordinates: 48°38′40″N 0°21′07″W
- Country: France
- Region: Normandy
- Department: Orne
- Arrondissement: Argentan
- Canton: La Ferté-Macé
- Intercommunality: CA Flers Agglo

Government
  - Mayor (2020–2026): Bernard Mésenge
- Area^{1}: 12.37 km^{2} (4.78 sq mi)
- Elevation: 237 m (778 ft)
- Highest elevation: 312 m (1,024 ft)
- Lowest elevation: 206 m (676 ft)
- Population (2023): 229
  - Density: 18.5/km^{2} (47.9/sq mi)
- Time zone: UTC+01:00 (CET)
  - Summer (DST): UTC+02:00 (CEST)
- INSEE/Postal code: 61233 /61600
- ^{1} French Land Register data, which excludes lakes, ponds, glaciers > 1 km^{2} (0.386 sq mi or 247 acres) and river estuaries.

Lonlay-le-Tesson (French pronunciation: [lɔ̃lɛ lə tɛsɔ̃]) is a commune in the Orne department in north-western France.

== Geography ==
The commune is made up of the following collection of villages and hamlets, La Culésière and Lonlay-le-Tesson.

It is 1,240 hectares (4.8 sq mi) in size. The highest point in the commune is 237 metres (778 ft).

There are a total of nine watercourses that traverse through the commune, two rivers The Rouvre and The Rouvrette. The other two water courses are streams, The Arthan and The Besier.

== See also ==
- Communes of the Orne department
