= Messei =

- Commune
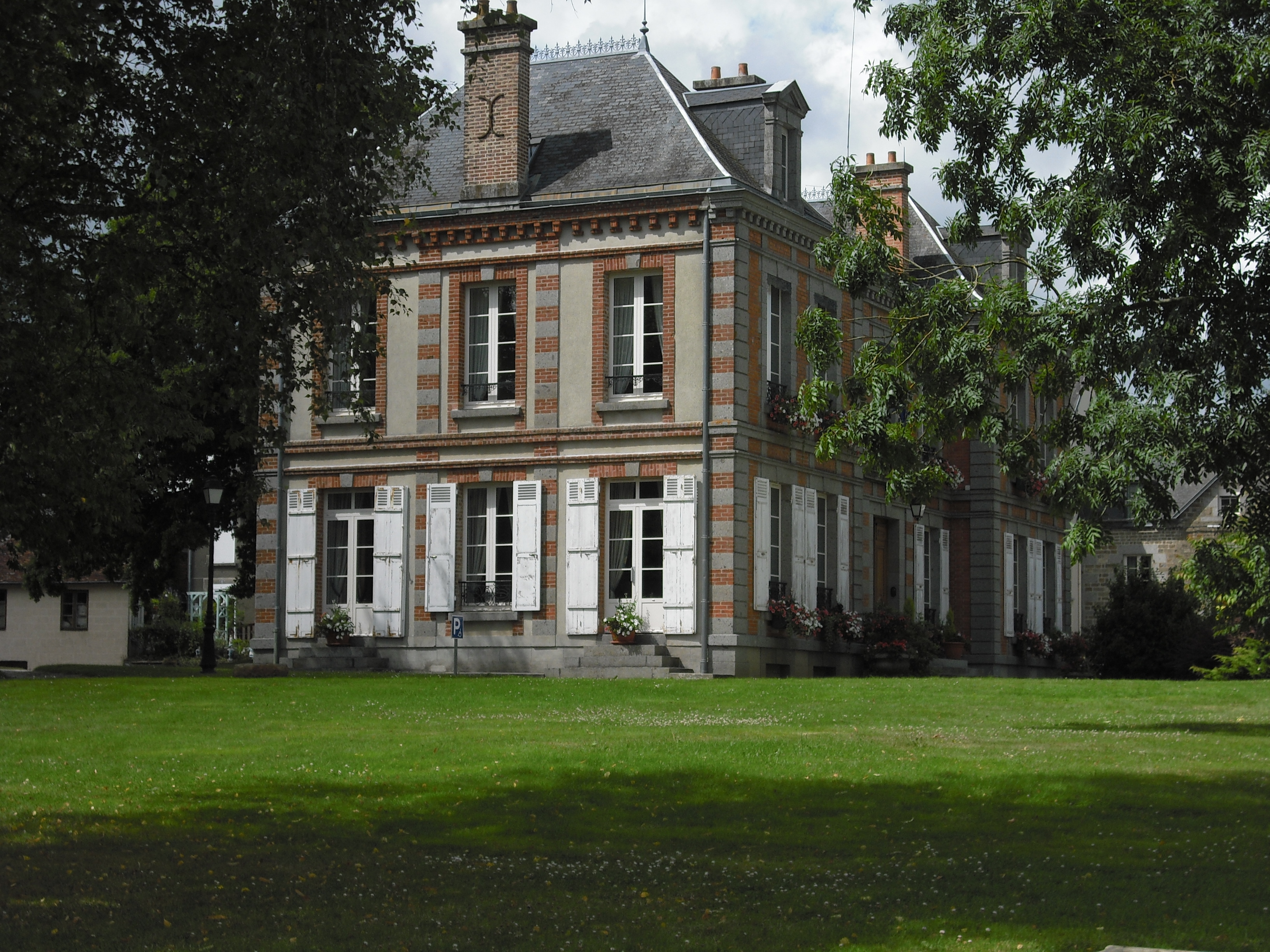
- Messei town hall

- Coat of arms
- Location of Messei
- Location within France Location within Normandy
- Coordinates: 48°42′44″N 0°32′09″W
- Country: France
- Region: Normandy
- Department: Orne
- Arrondissement: Argentan
- Canton: La Ferté-Macé
- Intercommunality: CA Flers Agglo

Government
  - Mayor (2020–2026): Michel Dumaine
- Area^{1}: 13.21 km^{2} (5.10 sq mi)
- Elevation: 218 m (715 ft)
- Highest elevation: 254 m (833 ft)
- Lowest elevation: 195 m (640 ft)
- Population (2023): 1,827
  - Density: 138.3/km^{2} (358.2/sq mi)
- Demonym: Messéens
- Time zone: UTC+01:00 (CET)
  - Summer (DST): UTC+02:00 (CEST)
- INSEE/Postal code: 61278 /61440
- ^{1} French Land Register data, which excludes lakes, ponds, glaciers > 1 km^{2} (0.386 sq mi or 247 acres) and river estuaries.

Messei (French pronunciation: [mɛsɛ]) is a commune in the Orne department in north-western France.

== Geography ==
The commune is made up of the following collection of villages and hamlets, La Pacotière, La Bondière, Les Buissons, Les Pasquières, Les Genétés, La Balonnière, La Haguerie, Messei, La Cheminière, Le Gué, La Bruyère and La Merrie.

It is 1,320 hectares (5.1 sq mi) in size. The highest point in the commune is 215 metres (705 ft).

There are three watercourses that traverse through the commune, the river Varenne, La Vere and a stream called the Blanche-Lande. The source of the river Varenne is in Messei.

== Notable buildings and places ==
=== National heritage sites ===
The commune has one building listed as a Monument historique, which are the remains of the old 11th-century castle in Messei and listed in 1975.

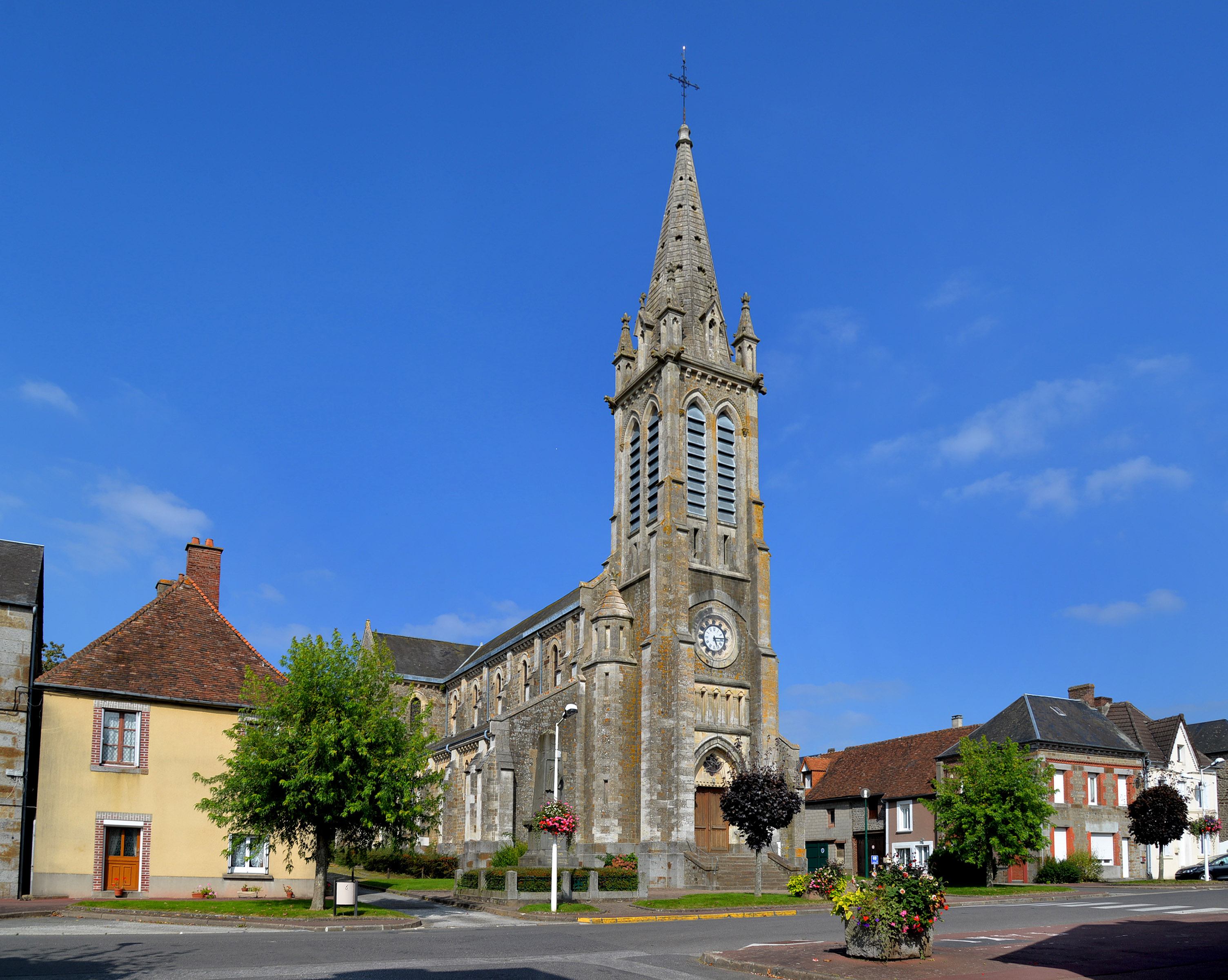
Church of Saint-Gervais and Saint-Protais in Messei

== Notable people ==
- Foulques du Merle - (1239-1314) was Seigneur of Gacé and Bellou-en-Houlme, and Baron of Le Merlerault, Briouze and Messei.
- Émile Deshayes de Marcère (1828-1918) - last surviving senator for life of the Third Republic was Mayor here, and later died here.

== See also ==
- Communes of the Orne department
