= Horses in Normandy =

Horses in Normandy have a clear economic importance, particularly through breeding. Present since the Bronze Age, horse breeding developed with the establishment of the Haras du Pin stud farm. Horses and horseback riding are an important tradition in the region, and Normandy boasts a number of renowned racecourses, in particular the one in Deauville where events take place regularly, including international ones such as the 2014 World Equestrian Games.

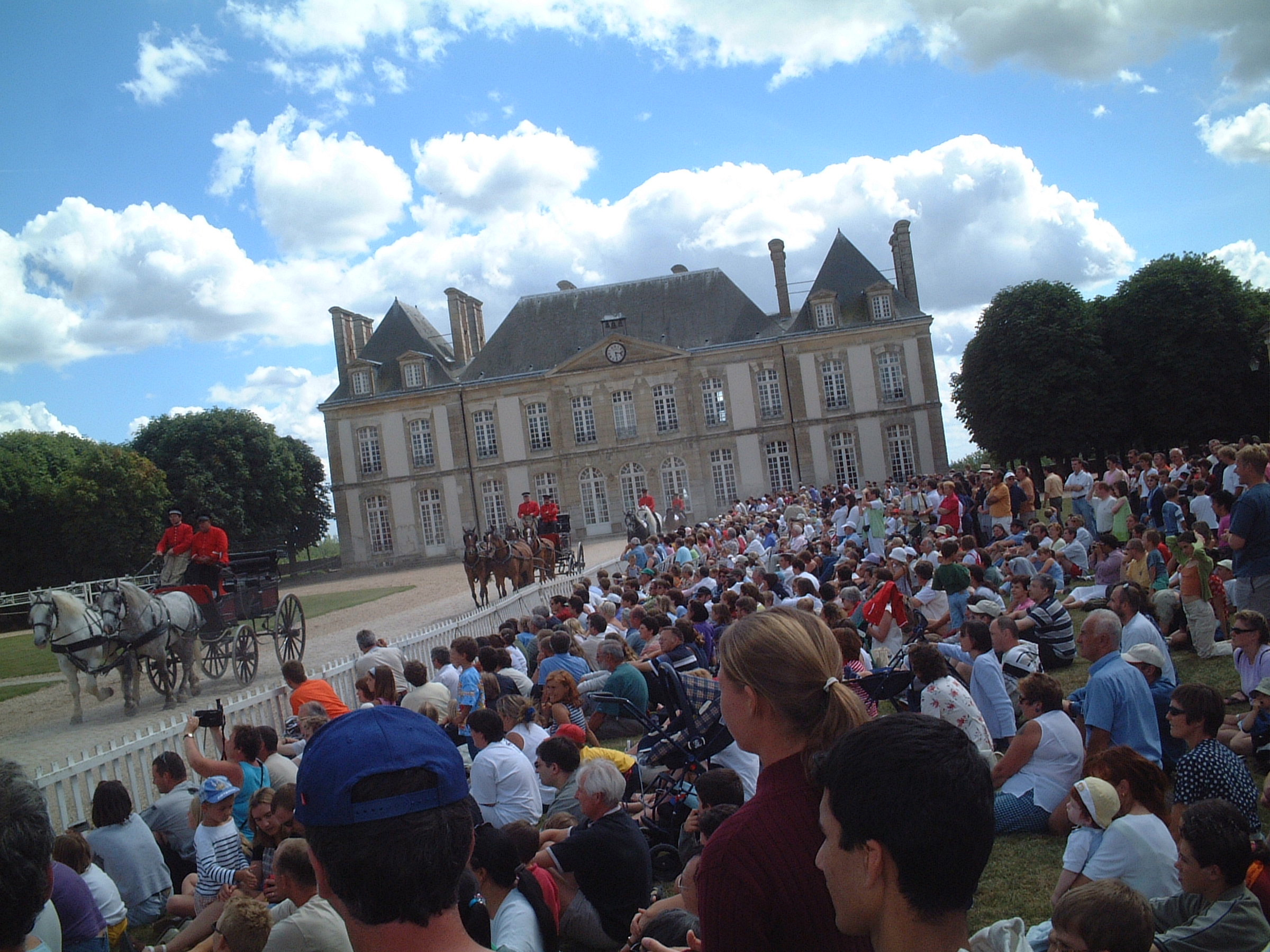
Horse-drawn carriage show at the Haras du Pin

== History ==
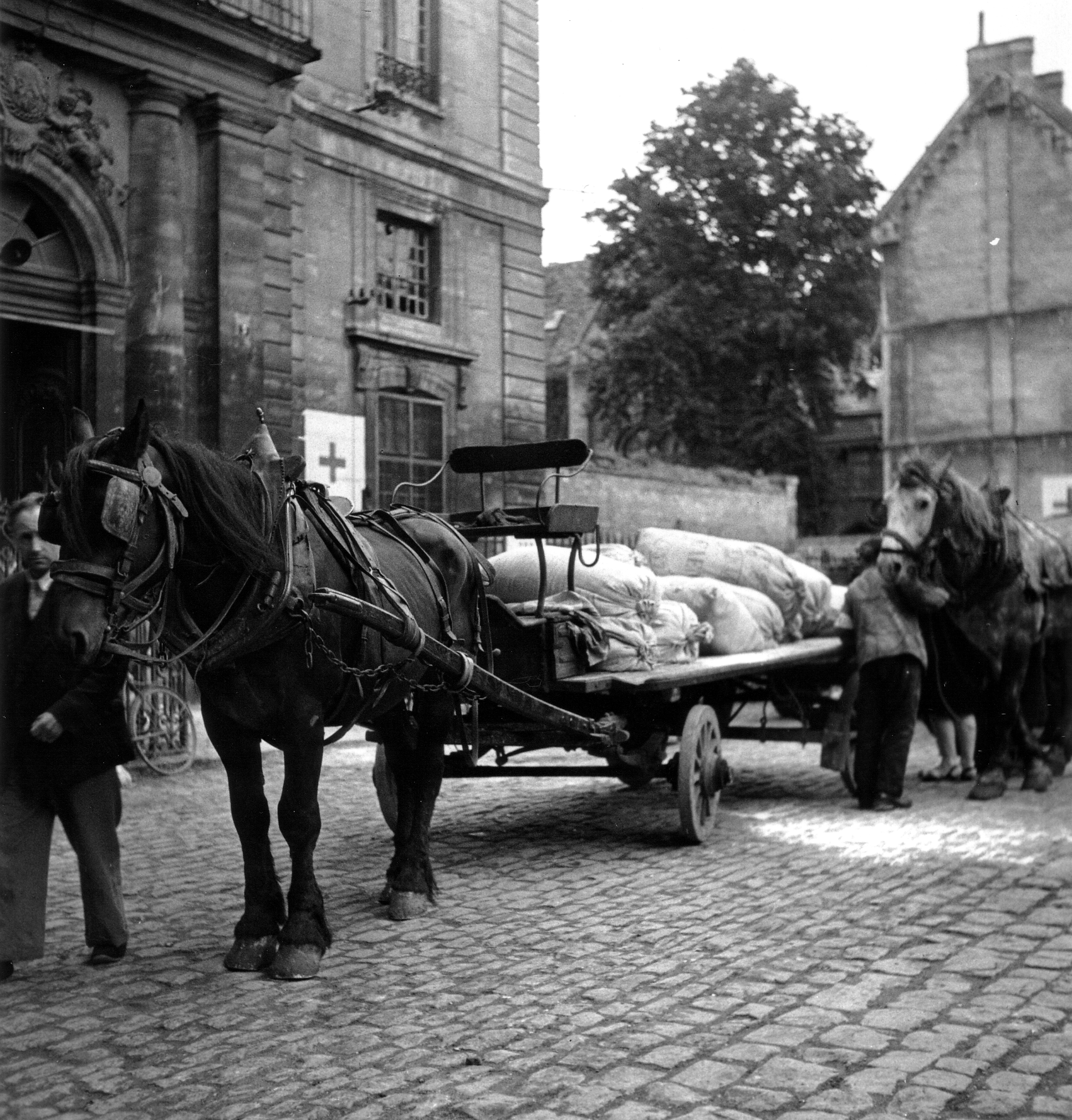
Draft horse in Caen, 1944

A few clues suggest the presence of domesticated horses in the region as early as the Neolithic period. However, the evidence from the Bronze Age allows us to state unequivocally that the domestic horse spread as an animal of prestige and combat.

During the July Monarchy, amid "equestrian Anglomania", the crossing of Norman horses with half-breeds and thoroughbreds was advocated. The local animals already had a good reputation. Half-blood breeding developed to the detriment of luxury horse breeding. Under the Second French Empire, the Orne department was considered the "stud farm of France", supplying a very large number of animals. During the German military occupation of France in World War II, numerous horse requisitions affected the region, causing the locals to revolt against the Germans.

== Economy ==
At the beginning of the 21st century, Lower Normandy was France's leading equine breeding region. Recognized worldwide for both horse births and riders, it accounts for almost half of all racehorse births in France. In 2005, the Normandy horse industry was recognized as a "National Competitiveness Cluster" in Lower Normandy. Throughout Normandy, a large number of training establishments prepare students for careers in the horse industry, from the CAP Agricole to the Master de Sciences et Management de la Filière Equine. There are specificities according to each department.

=== Calvados ===
There were 2,261 registered breeders in 2012, 66% of whom breed thoroughbreds and trotters. Calvados also boasts 92 riding schools, 8 racecourses, 17 equestrian tourism centers, and an establishment dedicated to horse auctions in Deauville, Arqana. Sales totaled 87 million euros in 2011. The horse industry accounts for 4,431 direct jobs, with 3,798 being full-time. Calvados is also home to two leading-edge equine research facilities: the Institut Pathologique du Cheval (IPC), which works with two research teams, and the Laboratoire Départemental, which specializes in equine infectious pathologies. The Caen region has one of the highest horse populations in France, with a density of 8.3 equidae/km² (2011 data). An important part of this economy is due to the presence of independent leisure horse owners.

=== Eure ===
The breeding of trotters and Selle Français horses is very present, but the Eure is above all a department for riders and equestrian sports, and one of the leading departments in France for horse riding, preparation and training. The Village Équestre de Conches is one of three national training centers for riding instructors.

=== Manche ===
The Selle Français breed clearly dominates, with both saddle and sport breeding. Many national and international equestrian champions were born in Manche. It is also the department of origin of the Norman Cob breed.

=== Orne ===
The Orne is a racehorse-breeding department, the first in France for trotters and the second for gallopers. It is also the historic cradle of the Percheron breed and home to the Haras National du Pin.

=== Seine-Maritime ===
On the contrary, the Seine-Maritime region has developed the touristic aspect of the equestrian sector, with numerous rural and forest trails covering more than 1,000 kilometers for riders. Breeding at Seine-Maritime focuses on Selle Français and racehorses.

=== Events ===
- Normandy Horse Show
- Equi'Days
- 2014 World Equestrian Games.

== Patrimony ==
=== Haras du Pin ===
The first of France's national stud farms, established by Colbert on the orders of Louis XIV, the Haras du Pin is located in the present-day department of Orne. This "Versailles of the horse" is the oldest and most prestigious of the national stud farms.

== Culture ==
Numerous Norman legends associate horses and riders. The Orne department in particular is culturally associated with the horse, the animal having served as its logo for many years.

== See also ==
- 2014 World Equestrian Games
- Haras National du Pin
- Horses in Brittany
- Merlerault
