= Le Merlerault =

- Part of Merlerault-le-Pin
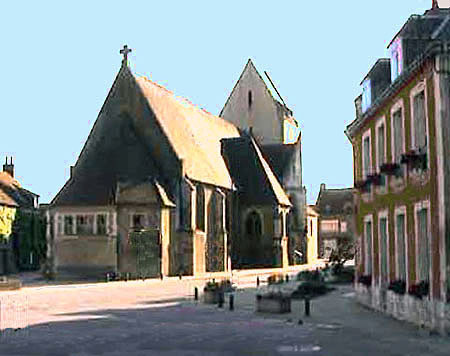
- The church in Le Merlerault
- Location of Le Merlerault
- Location within France Location within Normandy
- Coordinates: 48°42′04″N 0°17′11″E
- Country: France
- Region: Normandy
- Department: Orne
- Arrondissement: Mortagne-au-Perche
- Canton: Rai
- Commune: Merlerault-le-Pin
- Area^{1}: 19.1 km^{2} (7.4 sq mi)
- Elevation: 227 m (745 ft)
- Highest elevation: 321 m (1,053 ft)
- Lowest elevation: 184 m (604 ft)
- Population (2022): 754
  - Density: 39.5/km^{2} (102/sq mi)
- Time zone: UTC+01:00 (CET)
  - Summer (DST): UTC+02:00 (CEST)
- Postal code: 61240
- ^{1} French Land Register data, which excludes lakes, ponds, glaciers > 1 km^{2} (0.386 sq mi or 247 acres) and river estuaries.

Le Merlerault (French pronunciation: [lə mɛʁləʁo]) is a former commune in the Orne department in north-western France. On 1 January 2025, it was merged into the new commune of Merlerault-le-Pin.

== Geography ==
The former Commune is within the Natura 2000 protected area of Bocages et vergers du sud Pays d'Auge.

The former commune is part of a 20,593 hectare, Natura 2000 conservation area, called the Haute vallée de l'Orne et affluents.

== Points of interest ==
=== National heritage sites ===
- Ensemble castral remains of a medieval residence with a circular mound, it was registered as a Monument historique 1989.

== Notable people ==
- Foulques du Merle - (1239 - 1314) was Seigneur of Gacé and Bellou-en-Houlme, and Baron of Le Merlerault, Briouze and Messei.
- François Pouqueville - (1770 – 1838) a French diplomat, writer, explorer, physician and historian, and member of the Institut de France was born here.
- Léon Labbé - (1832 – 1916) a French surgeon and politician was born here.

== Heraldry ==
Arms of Le Merlerault	The arms of Le Merlerault are blazoned : Argent, a blackbird sable, on a chief azure a heart argent between 2 fleurs de lys Or.

== Twin towns – sister cities ==
Le Merlerault is twinned with:

- Collingbourne Ducis, United Kingdom (since 1992)

== See also ==
- Communes of the Orne department
