= Priory of Le Plessis-Grimoult =

Augustinian monastery in Calvados, Normandy, France

- Prieuré du Plessis-Grimoult
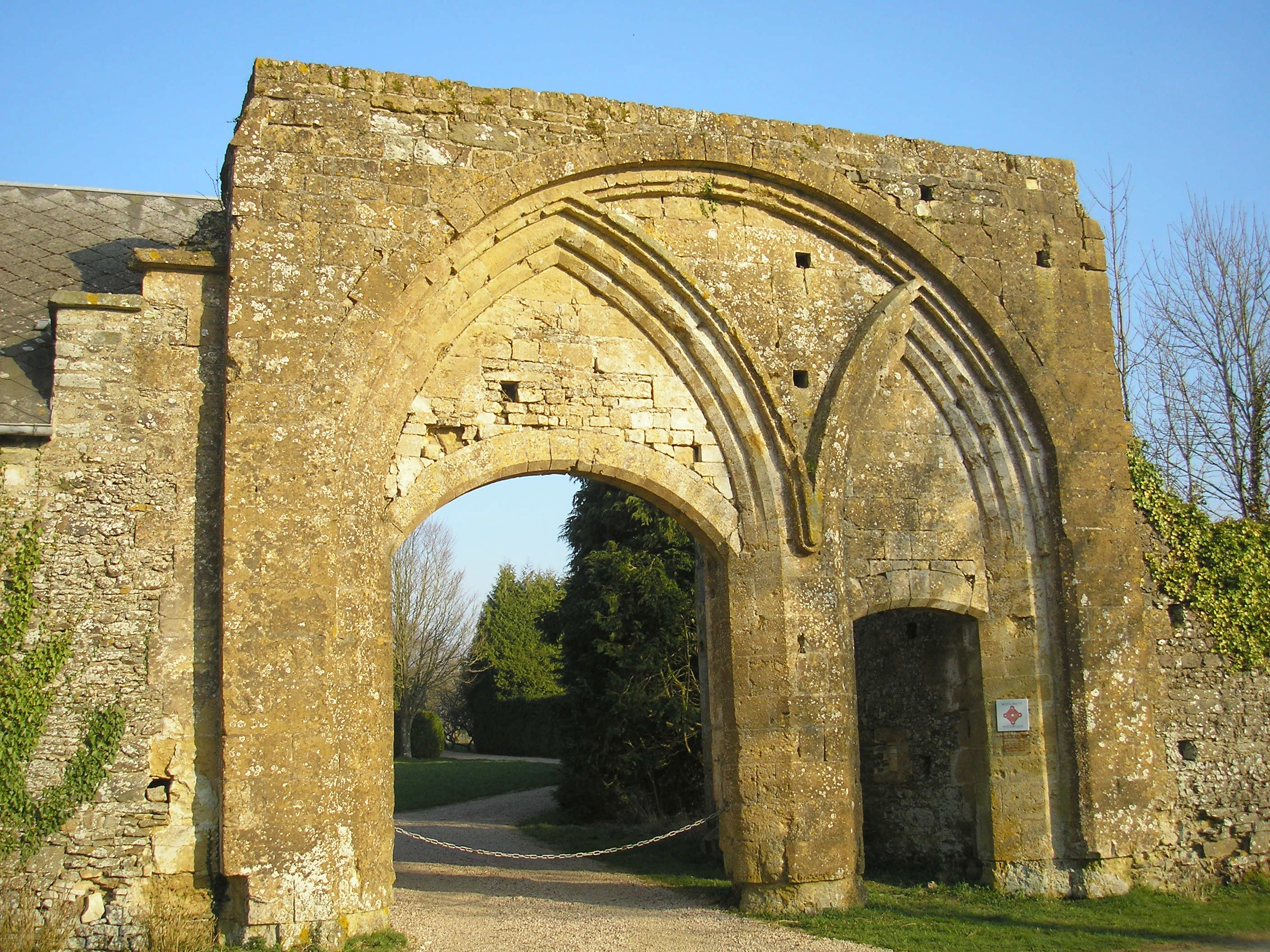
- Guillaume Causson's 13th-century doorway

Religion
- Affiliation: Catholic Church
- Region: Normandy
- Deity: Christian God
- Patron: Saint Stephen
- Year consecrated: 1131

Location
- Municipality: Plessis-Grimoult
- Country: France
- Interactive map of Priory of Le Plessis-Grimoult
- Coordinates: 48°57′43″N 0°36′30″W

Architecture
- Founder: Richard Samson
- Creator: Guillaume Causson

The Priory of Le Plessis-Grimoult (French: Prieuré du Plessis-Grimoult) is a former Augustinian monastery established in the 12th century in Le Plessis-Grimoult in the department of Calvados, Normandy, France. The ruins were listed as a monument historique (national heritage site) in 1928, and the nearby archaeological site and the remains of the fortified garden in 1996.

== History ==
=== Establishment ===
In 1047, the local baron, Grimoult du Plessis, was executed for an attempted coup against William the Bastard (later William the Conqueror), the Duke of Normandy, and his lands were given to the duke's half brother, Odo, the Bishop of Bayeux, to become part of his diocese. In 1131, the local church was dedicated to Saint Stephen.

Around 1135, William's former chaplain, Richard Samson, better known as Richard of Dover, was the local priest. He brought a community of canons regular to Le Plessis-Grimoult and in so doing became the first prior there. The canons lived in Samson's own presbytery at that time. In 1153, under Richard's successor, the canons moved to Champ Osburt. Under Prior Henri I, the canons moved again to the château de Vire. The church building and priory in its current location were built in the late 13th century under the direction of Prior Guillaume Causson, Henri I's successor. Only the priory's gate remains standing today.

=== Under Bossuet ===
Jacques-Bénigne Bossuet became the tutor to the Grand Dauphin in 1671. The time his new position required him to spend at court meant he could no longer serve as Bishop of Condom. Because of this, he lost access to all the monetary benefits he was entitled to as bishop and could not afford to live the lavish lifestyle that came with living at court. To compensate his son's tutor, Louis XIV appointed him to be the prior of Le Plessis-Grimoult. This provided Bossuet with a steady income, without requiring too much of his time.

During his time as prior, he had a dispute with Julian de Saint-Germain, the priest of Maisoncelles-la-Jourdan, over the collection of tithes. There was a trial on 18 August 1677, which found that Saint-Germain had to pay Bossuet an annual sum of 230 livres in exchange for Bossuet giving up his right to collect tithes in Maisoncelles.

=== Priors ===
The priory had 35 priors from its foundation to the nationalization of church property during the French Revolution.

No.	Name	Years in office	Notes
1	Richard Samson	~1135-1153	founder
2	Nicholas Coquin (Nicholas I)	1153-1190	moved priory to Champ Osburt
3	Étienne I	1193-unknown	
4	Radulphe	unknown-1210	distant relative of Baron Grimoult
5	Guillame I	1210-1234	
6	Pierre de la Barre (Pierre I)	1234-1250	
7	Henri	1250-unknown	moved priory to the château de Vire
8	Guillaume Causson (Guillaume II)	Unknown-1290	built the church and the priory gate (which still stands today)
9	Richard le Moine (the monk)	1290-1314	
10	Guillaume Pinçon (Guillaume III)	1314-1340	
11	Guillaume de Canteil (Guillaume IV)	1340-1369	reduced the number of canons from 56 to 45
12	Jean Maufras (Jean I)	1370-1398	
13	Pierre de Missy (Pierre II)	1398-1400	
14	Matthieu de Chaumoncel	1400-1412	
15	Guillaume de l'Orme (Guillaume V)	1412-1433	
16	Jean Marivint or Marvint (Jean II)	1433-1457	buried in the church
17	Pierre de Missy (Pierre III)	1470-1477	
18	Bertin Marvint	1477-1480	nephew of Jean Marvint
19	Gabriel le Veneur	1480-1523	
20	Nicholas de Saint-Germain (Nicholas II)	1523-1543	
21	Guillaume de Saint-Germain (Guillaume VI)	1543-1582	nephew of the previous prior; during his time in office Calvinists burned down most of the priory
22	Robert Maunoury	1582	
23	Francois de Lusignan	1582-1592	
24	Louis Cochu	1592-1604	
25	Jean le Bel, or le Bel de Nantes	1605-unknown	
26	François de Montmorency (Francois II)	1612-1618	beheaded in 1627 because he broke the law against duelling
27	Louis de Montmorency (Louis II)	1618	brother of the previous prior
28	Étienne le Berger (Étienne II)	1618-1625	
29	Georges du Fay	1625-1651	
30	Jaques de Matignon	1652-1670	
31	Jacques-Bénigne Bossuet	1671-1704	tutor to the eldest son of Louis XIV
32	Marie-Joseph d'Hostung	1704-1706	
33	Léonor Goyon de Matignon	1706-1757	cousin of Jacques I, Prince of Monaco
34	M. Lemercier	1757-1787	
35	Louis-François de Berton du Prat	1787-1789	last prior of Le Plessis-Grimoult

== Architecture ==
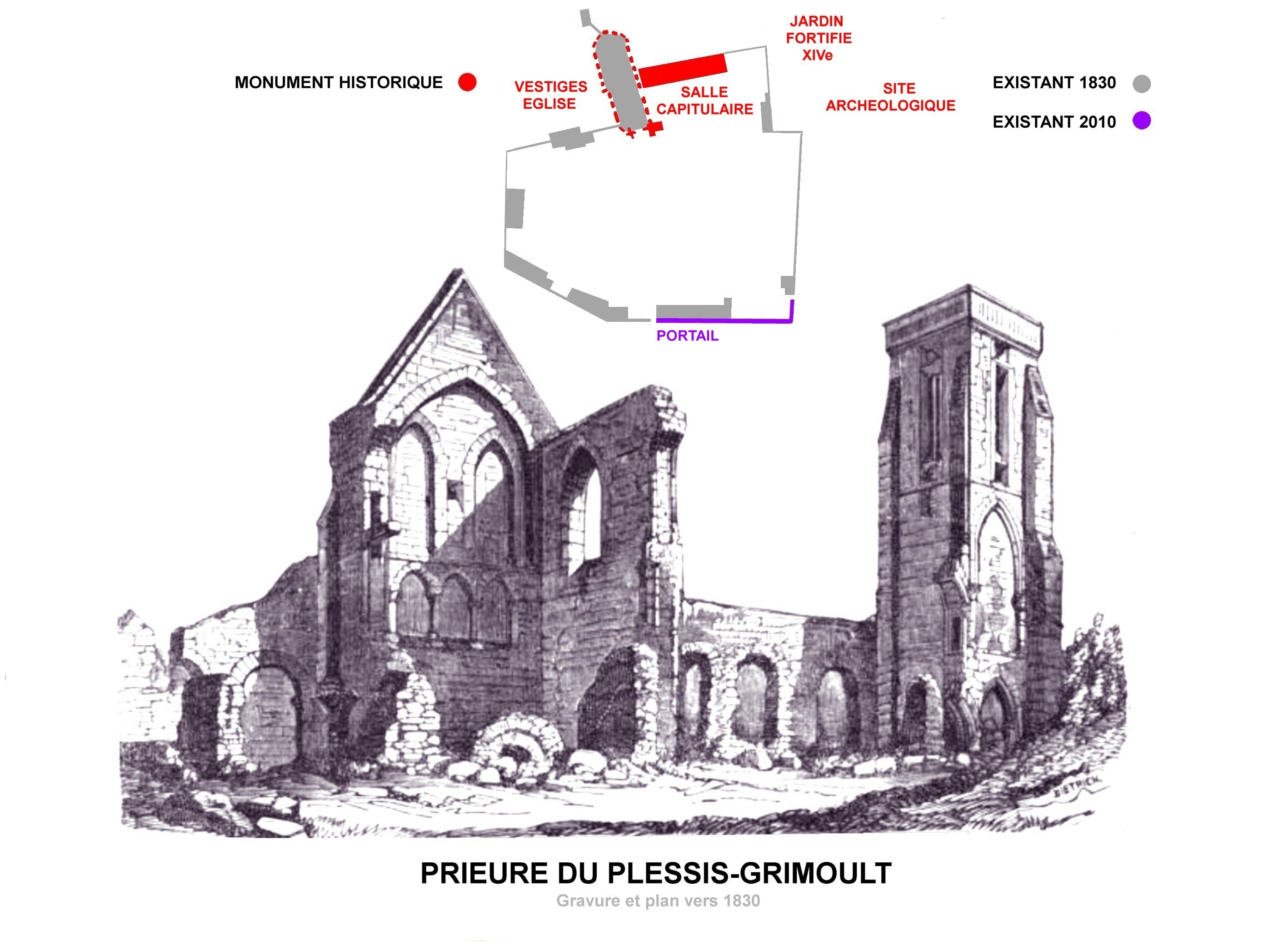
Priory in 1830

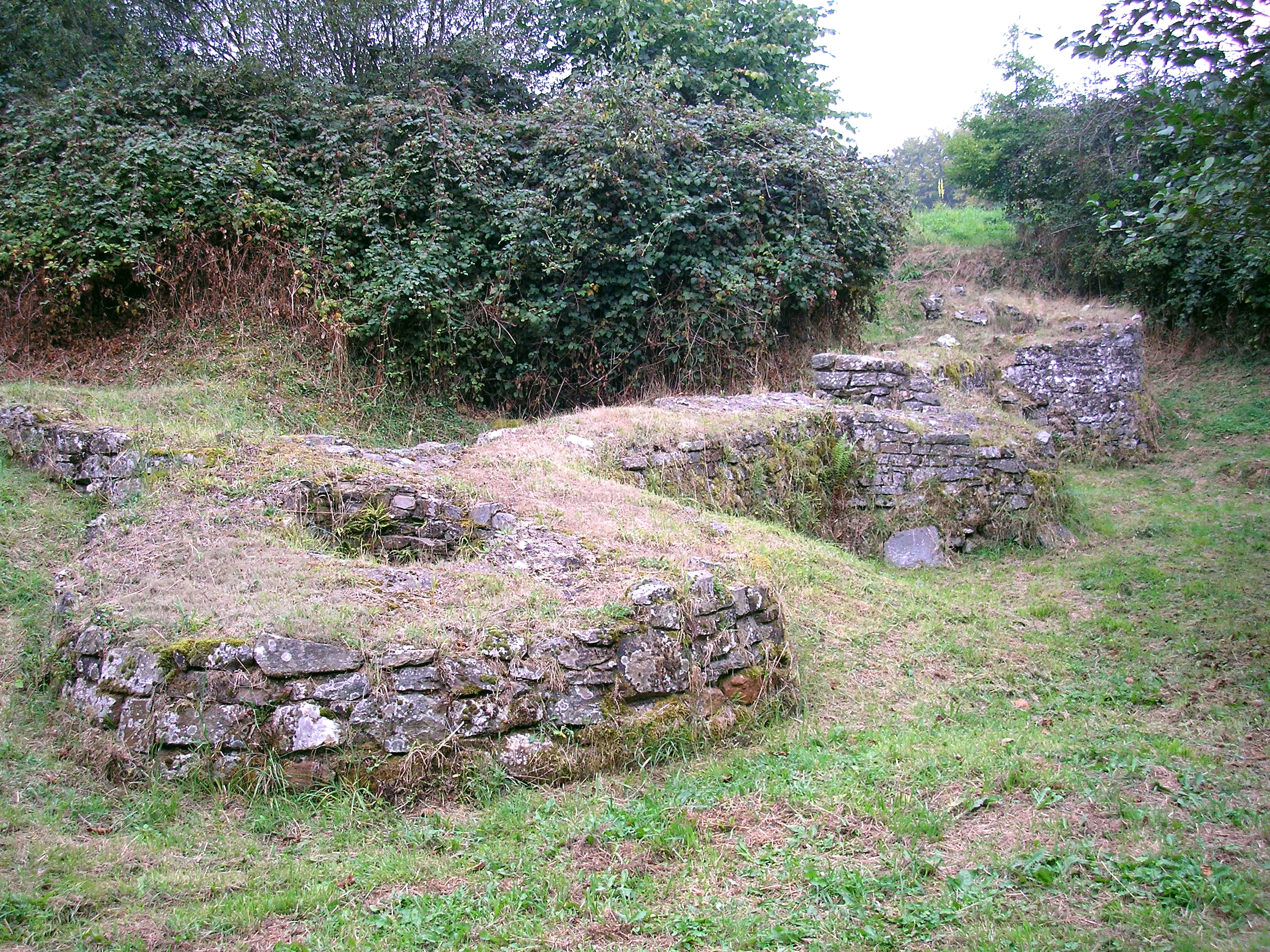
The fortified garden

In 1830 the building consisted of a transept terminating in an apse. There were several columns with capitals which dated back to the 13th century. The choir was older than the tower. The roof was non-existent by 1830, having most likely been made of wood. The western wall of the cloister was still standing. Two doors open onto the gallery of the cloister. The capitals of the columns are from the end of the 14th or the 15th century. In the other rooms on the ground floor, the octagonal columns have capitals that are perhaps from the 14th century. There is a beautiful fireplace in a room that is believed to be the kitchen. Gardens and ponds are farther to the east. To the west of the outer courtyard of the priory, there is a doorway that dates to about the 13th or 14th century.

== Parishes served ==
The priory served the parishes of Le Plessis-Grimoult, Roullours, Carville, Chênedollé, Truttemer-le-Grand, Montsecret, Sainte-Honorine-la-Chardonne, Saint-Jean-le-Blanc, Campandré, Montchauvet, Frênes, Saint-Vigor-des-Mézerets, Périgny, Cauville, Proussy, Bernières-le-Patry, Maisoncelles-la-Jourdan, Estry, Saint-Christophe-de-Chaulieu, Beauchêne, Clairefougère, Saint-Cornier-des-Landes, Saint-Jean-des-Bois, Saint-Quentin-les-Chardonnets, Yvrandes, Bonnemaison, Courvaudon, Feuguerolles-Bully, Fontaine-Étoupefour, Rosel, La Cambe, Osmanville, Mondrainville, Noyers-Bocage, Planquery, Saint-Germain-d'Elle, Bretteville-le-Rabet, Campeaux and Colombelles.
