= Beauchesne =

Beauchesne or Beauchêne may refer to:

== Beauchesne ==
=== Athletes ===
- Chantal Beauchesne (born 1984), Canadian 2016 Summer Paralympics Sitting Volleyball athlete
- Geneviève Beauchesne-Sévigny (born 1986), Canadian canoeist, competitor in the 2008 Summer Olympics in Beijing
- Gabriel Beauchesne-Sévigny (born 1984), Canadian canoeist, competitor in the 2008 Summer Olympics in Beijing

=== Writing, film, TV ===
- John de Beauchesne (1538–1620), late French writing master (teacher of penmanship) and calligrapher
- Sarah-Maude Beauchesne (born 1990), Canadian award-winning film and TV screenwriter

=== Public service ===
- Arthur Beauchesne (1876–1959), late Canadian Clerk of the House of Commons, author of the procedural manual, Rules and Forms of the House of Commons

- Pierre-Clovis Beauchesne (1841–1918), late Canadian politician

== Alternate spelling: Beauchêne ==
- Beauchêne (disambiguation)

=== People ===
- Jacques Gouin de Beauchêne (1652–1730), late French explorer

=== Places ===
- Beauchene Island, southernmost of the Falkland Islands, discovered in 1701 by Jacques Gouin de Beauchêne
- Beauchêne, Loir-et-Cher, commune in the Loir-et-Cher department in central France.
- Beauchêne, Orne, in the Orne department
- Saint-Julien-en-Beauchêne, in the Hautes-Alpes department
