= Tinchebray-Bocage =

- Commune
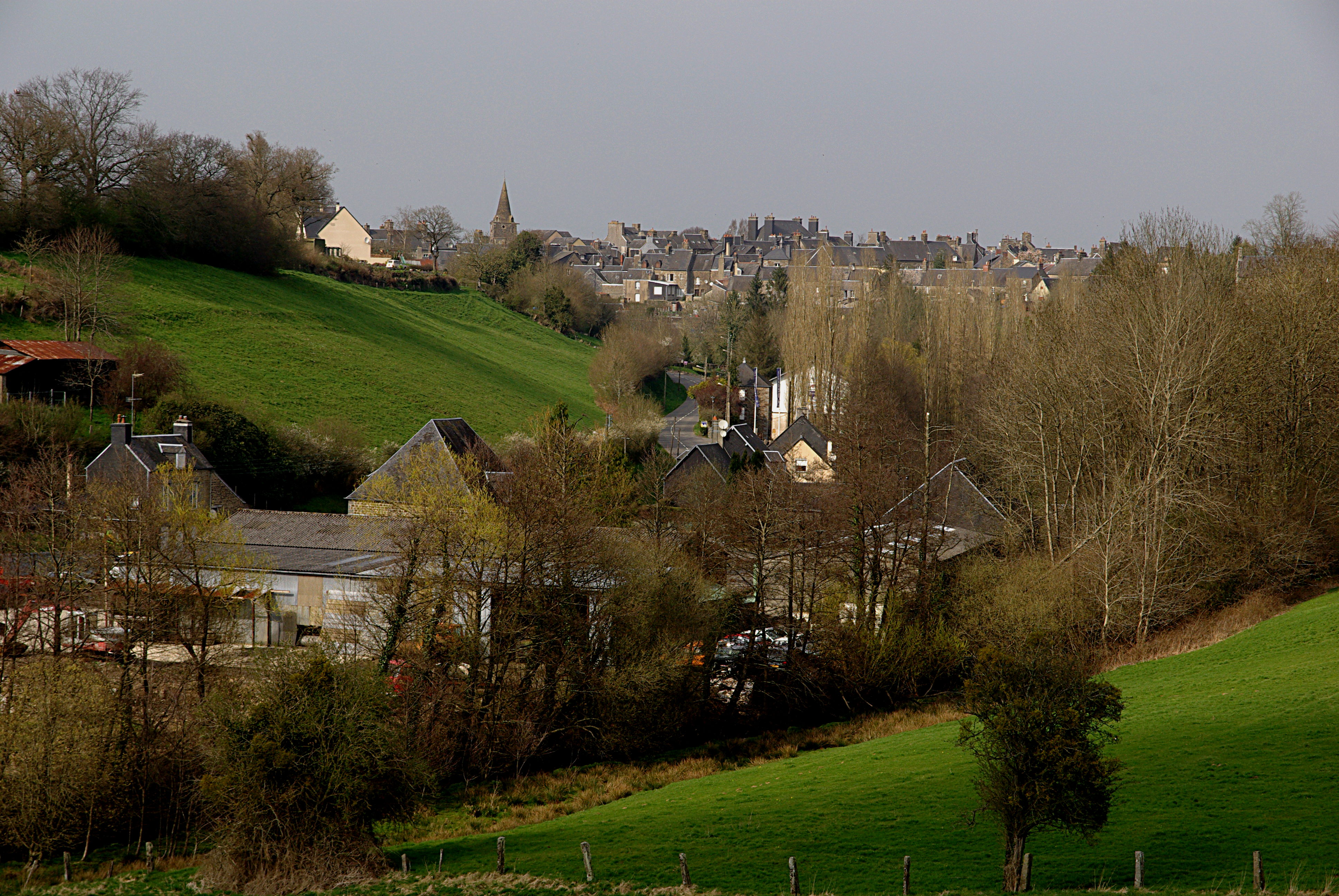
- A general view of Tinchebray
- Location of Tinchebray-Bocage
- Location within France Location within Normandy
- Coordinates: 48°45′49″N 0°43′59″W
- Country: France
- Region: Normandy
- Department: Orne
- Arrondissement: Argentan
- Canton: Domfront en Poiraie
- Intercommunality: Domfront Tinchebray

Government
  - Mayor (2020–2026): Josette Porquet
- Area^{1}: 99.88 km^{2} (38.56 sq mi)
- Highest elevation: 151 m (495 ft)
- Lowest elevation: 77 m (253 ft)
- Population (2023): 4,813
  - Density: 48.19/km^{2} (124.8/sq mi)
- Time zone: UTC+01:00 (CET)
  - Summer (DST): UTC+02:00 (CEST)
- INSEE/Postal code: 61486 /61800
- Website: www.tinchebray.fr
- ^{1} French Land Register data, which excludes lakes, ponds, glaciers > 1 km^{2} (0.386 sq mi or 247 acres) and river estuaries.

Tinchebray-Bocage (French pronunciation: [tɛ̃ʃ(ə)bʁɛ bɔkaʒ]) is a commune in the Orne department in the Normandy region in north-western France. The result of the merger, on 1 January 2015, of the communes of Beauchêne, Frênes, Larchamp, Saint-Cornier-des-Landes, Saint-Jean-des-Bois, Tinchebray and Yvrandes.

== Geography ==
The commune is made up of the following collection of villages and hamlets, Frênes, Poulhaye, Tinchebray, La Béharie, Saint-Jean-des-Bois, Yvrandes, Les Trois Cheminées, Larchamp, Le Biot and Beauchêne.

The rivers Noireau and Égrenne flow through the commune.

The commune is on the border of the area known as Suisse Normande.

== Population ==
Population data refer to the area corresponding with the commune as of January 2025.

Historical population
Year	Pop.	±% p.a.
1968	5,586	—
1975	5,460	−0.33%
1982	5,334	−0.33%
1990	5,154	−0.43%
1999	5,067	−0.19%
2007	5,008	−0.15%
2012	5,049	+0.16%
2017	4,933	−0.46%
2023	4,813	−0.41%
Source: INSEE

== Points of Interest ==
- Musée du clou is a museum set in an authentic 18th century forge, that is dedicated to the making of nails
- Maison du sabotier - a museum dedicated to the tools and machinery used in the making of Clogs.
- Prison royale de Tinchebray - a local museum dedicated to telling the story of the local 17th century prison.

=== National Heritage sites ===
The Commune has a total of 6 buildings and areas listed as a Monument historique.

- Yvrandes Church - 14th Century church, added as a monument in 1926.
- Former prison of Tinchebray - 17th Century prison, added as a monument in 1978. It is now a museum.
- Rochefort spinning mill - 19th Century Mill that was in use up to 1960 for working with wool, added as a monument in 1997.
- Montiers Church - 17th century church, added as a monument in 1985.
- Saint-Rémy Chapel - an 11th-century church, added as a monument in 1944.
- Manoir de la Guyonnière - a 17th-century manor house, added as a monument in 1979.

== Notable people ==
- Jean-Baptiste Quéruel (1779 -1845)the inventor of the method for industrial production of sugar from beet died and was buried here.
- Edgar Le Bastard (1836 -1892) a French industrialist and politician in the nineteenth century was born here.
- André Breton (1896 -1966) a French writer and poet, the co-founder, leader, and principal theorist of surrealism, was born here.
- Guy Degrenne (1925 - 2006) a French businessman who specialised in cutlery and silverware.
- Sylvia Bassot (1940 - 2014) a member of the National Assembly of France from 1996 until 2012 is buried here.
- Jérôme Nury - a member of the National Assembly of France is mayor of the commune, and been previous mayor of Tinchebray.

== Twin towns – sister cities ==
Tinchebray-Bocage is twinned with:

- Fallingbostel-Dorfmark, Germany

== See also ==
- Communes of the Orne department
