= Chaulieu (disambiguation) =

Chaulieu may refer to

== People ==
- Guillaume Amfrye de Chaulieu (1639–1720), French poet and wit
- Pierre Chaulieu, pseudonym of Cornelius Castoriadis (1922–1997), a Greek-French philosopher, social critic, economist, psychoanalyst, and author

== Place ==
- Chaulieu a commune in the Manche department in Normandy in north-western France
- Saint-Christophe-de-Chaulieu

== Other ==
- Louise de Chaulieu (1805–1835), character in Mémoires de deux jeunes mariées by Honoré de Balzac
