= Edgar Le Bastard =

French industrialist and politician

Franciè Le Bastard
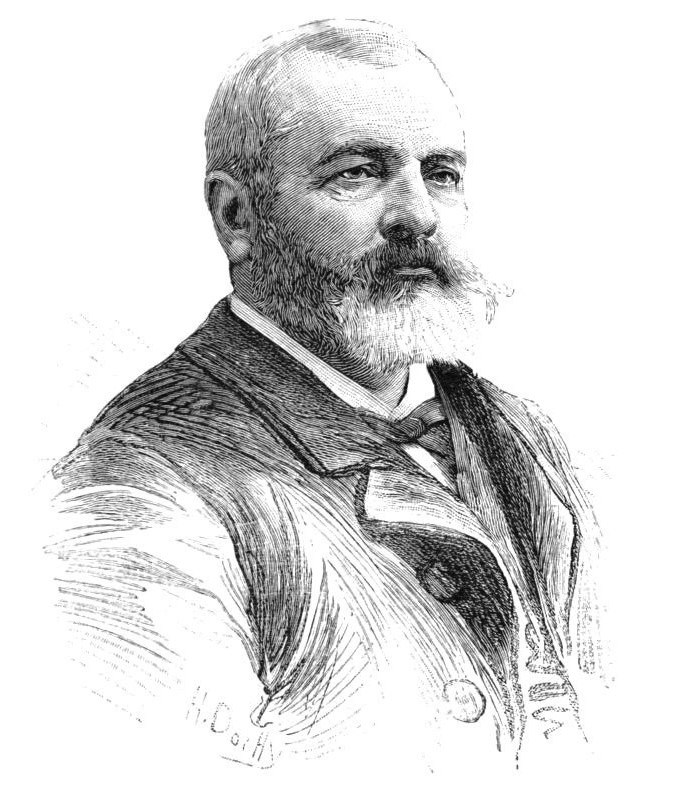
- Edgar Le Bastard
- Born: January 21, 1836; Tinchebray-Bocage
- Died: June 28, 1892 (aged 56)
- Occupation: Actor

Edgar Le Bastard (21 January 1836, Tinchebray – 28 June 1892) was a French industrialist and politician in the nineteenth century. He was mayor of Rennes from 1880 until his death in 1892 and senator of Ille-et-Vilaine from 1879 to 1888.
