= Maisoncelles =

Maisoncelles is the name or part of the name of several communes in France.

- Maisoncelles, Haute-Marne, in the Haute-Marne département
- Maisoncelles, Sarthe, in the Sarthe département
- Maisoncelles-du-Maine, in the Mayenne département
- Maisoncelles-en-Brie, in the Seine-et-Marne département
- Maisoncelles-en-Gâtinais, in the Seine-et-Marne département
- Maisoncelles la Jourdan, in the Calvados département
- Maisoncelles-Pelvey, in the Calvados département
- Maisoncelles sur Ajon, in the Calvados département
- Maisoncelle, in the Pas-de-Calais département
- Maisoncelle-et-Villers, in the Ardennes département
- Maisoncelle-Saint-Pierre, in the Oise département
- Maisoncelle-Tuilerie, in the Oise département
