= Beauchêne =

Beauchêne is the name or part of the name of several communes in France:

- Beauchêne, Loir-et-Cher, in the Loir-et-Cher department
- Beauchêne, Orne, in the Orne department
- Saint-Julien-en-Beauchêne, in the Hautes-Alpes department
