= Larchamp =

Larchamp may refer to the following places in France:

- Larchamp, Mayenne, a commune in the Mayenne department
- Larchamp, Orne, a commune in the Orne department
