= Yvrandes =

- Part of Tinchebray-Bocage
- Location of Yvrandes
- Location within France Location within Normandy
- Coordinates: 48°43′13″N 0°44′57″W
- Country: France
- Region: Normandy
- Department: Orne
- Arrondissement: Argentan
- Canton: Domfront
- Commune: Tinchebray-Bocage
- Area^{1}: 10.33 km^{2} (3.99 sq mi)
- Highest elevation: 321 m (1,053 ft)
- Lowest elevation: 181 m (594 ft)
- Population (2022): 136
  - Density: 13.2/km^{2} (34.1/sq mi)
- Time zone: UTC+01:00 (CET)
  - Summer (DST): UTC+02:00 (CEST)
- Postal code: 61800
- ^{1} French Land Register data, which excludes lakes, ponds, glaciers > 1 km^{2} (0.386 sq mi or 247 acres) and river estuaries.

Yvrandes (French pronunciation: [ivʁɑ̃d]) is a former commune in the Orne department in the Normandy region in north-western France. On 1 January 2015, Yvrandes and six other communes merged becoming one commune called Tinchebray-Bocage.

== See also ==
Communes of the Orne department
