= Le Fresne-Poret =

- Commune
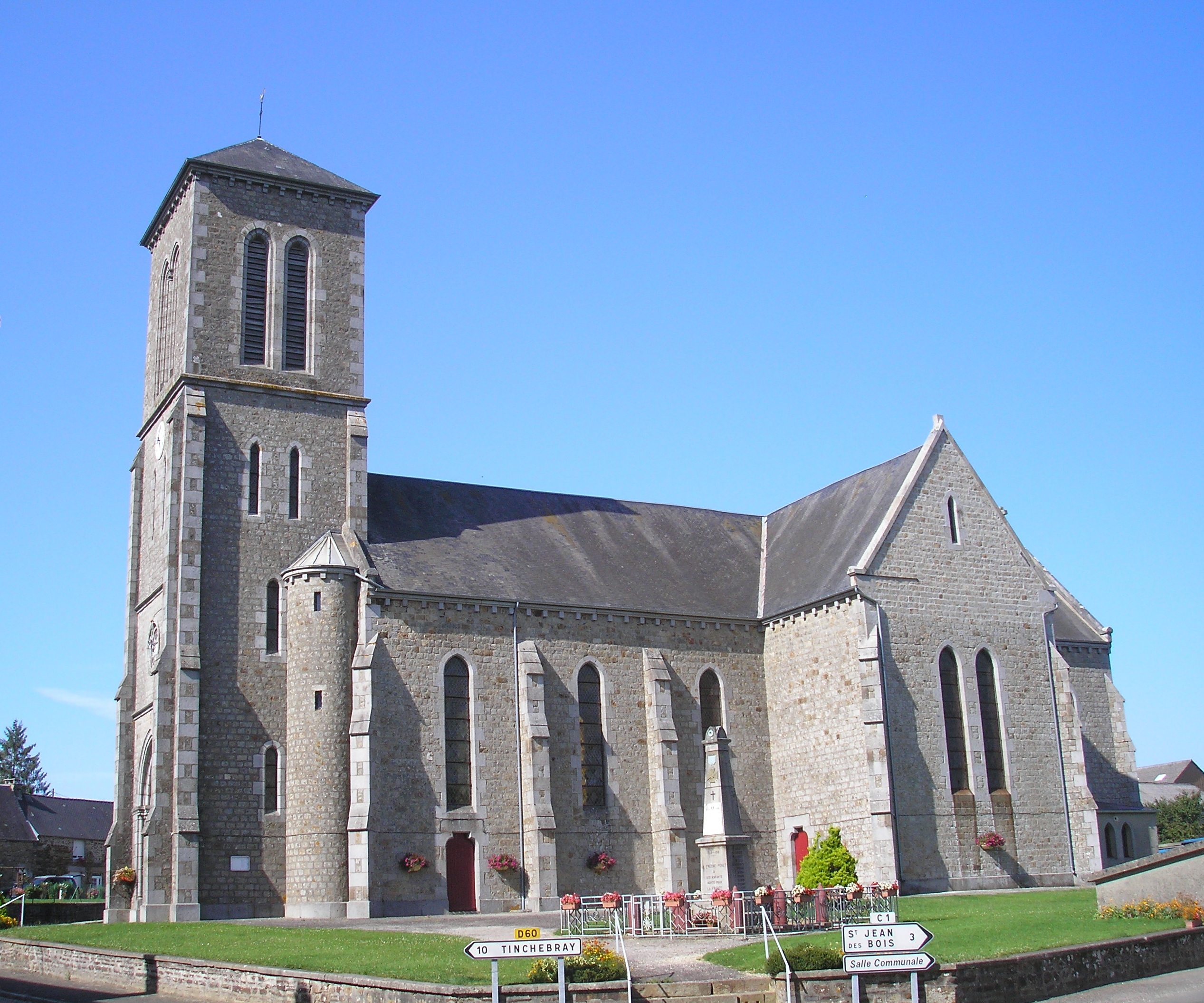
- The church of Saint-Jean-Baptiste
- Location of Le Fresne-Poret
- Location within France Location within Normandy
- Coordinates: 48°42′39″N 0°49′43″W
- Country: France
- Region: Normandy
- Department: Manche
- Arrondissement: Avranches
- Canton: Le Mortainais
- Intercommunality: CA Mont-Saint-Michel-Normandie

Government
  - Mayor (2020–2026): Pascal Grente
- Area^{1}: 10.08 km^{2} (3.89 sq mi)
- Elevation: 268 m (879 ft)
- Highest elevation: 316 m (1,037 ft)
- Lowest elevation: 204 m (669 ft)
- Population (2023): 226
  - Density: 22.4/km^{2} (58.1/sq mi)
- Time zone: UTC+01:00 (CET)
  - Summer (DST): UTC+02:00 (CEST)
- INSEE/Postal code: 50193 /50850
- ^{1} French Land Register data, which excludes lakes, ponds, glaciers > 1 km^{2} (0.386 sq mi or 247 acres) and river estuaries.

Le Fresne-Poret (French pronunciation: [lə fʁɛn pɔʁɛ]) is a commune in the Manche department in north-western France.

== Geography ==
The commune is made up of the following collection of villages and hamlets, Le Pont d'Egrenne and Le Fresne-Poret.

The river Égrenne flows through the commune.

== See also ==
- Communes of the Manche department
