= Clairefougère =

Commune in Orne, France

- Part of Montsecret-Clairefougère
- Location of Clairefougère
- Location within France Location within Normandy
- Coordinates: 48°48′23″N 0°41′48″W
- Country: France
- Region: Normandy
- Department: Orne
- Arrondissement: Argentan
- Canton: Domfront
- Commune: Montsecret-Clairefougère
- Area^{1}: 3.28 km^{2} (1.27 sq mi)
- Elevation: 149 m (489 ft)
- Highest elevation: 211 m (692 ft)
- Lowest elevation: 129 m (423 ft)
- Population (2022): 127
  - Density: 38.7/km^{2} (100/sq mi)
- Demonym: Clarificiens
- Time zone: UTC+01:00 (CET)
  - Summer (DST): UTC+02:00 (CEST)
- Postal code: 61800
- ^{1} French Land Register data, which excludes lakes, ponds, glaciers > 1 km^{2} (0.386 sq mi or 247 acres) and river estuaries.

Clairefougère (French pronunciation: [klɛʁfuʒɛʁ]) is a former commune in the Orne department in north-western France. In 2015, it became part of Montsecret-Clairefougère.

== See also ==
- Communes of the Orne department
