= Larchamp, Orne =

Larchamp
- Part of Tinchebray-Bocage
- Location of Larchamp
- Location within France Location within Normandy
- Coordinates: 48°41′41″N 0°41′02″W
- Country: France
- Region: Normandy
- Department: Orne
- Arrondissement: Argentan
- Canton: Domfront
- Commune: Tinchebray-Bocage
- Area^{1}: 8.41 km^{2} (3.25 sq mi)
- Elevation: 270 m (890 ft)
- Highest elevation: 301 m (988 ft)
- Lowest elevation: 211 m (692 ft)
- Population (2022): 285
  - Density: 33.9/km^{2} (87.8/sq mi)
- Time zone: UTC+01:00 (CET)
  - Summer (DST): UTC+02:00 (CEST)
- Postal code: 61800
- ^{1} French Land Register data, which excludes lakes, ponds, glaciers > 1 km^{2} (0.386 sq mi or 247 acres) and river estuaries.

Larchamp (French pronunciation: [laʁʃɑ̃]) is a former commune in the Orne department in the Normandy region in north-western France. On 1 January 2015, Larchamp and six other communes merged becoming one commune called Tinchebray-Bocage.

== See also ==
- Communes of the Orne department
