= François de Montmorency-Bouteville =

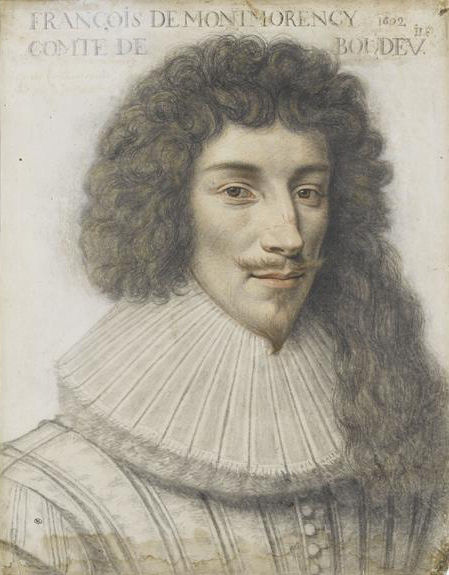
François de Montmorency, comte de Bouteville et de Luxé, by Dumonstier

François de Montmorency-Bouteville (1600 – 22 June 1627) was the second son of Louis de Montmorency, Comte de Bouteville, Vice-Admiral of France under Henri IV. In 1612, he became prior of Le Plessis-Grimoult in name, and in person in 1616. He remained prior until 1618 when he stepped down in favor of his brother Louis. François succeeded his brother Henri in 1616 and became Duke of Luxembourg and Governor of Senlis. He served with distinction at the sieges of Saint-Jean-d'Angély, Montauban, Royan and Montpellier.

After fighting a duel against the Comte de Pontgibaud, he killed the Marquis de Portes in 1625. Dueling had long been forbidden, but the penalty of death was rarely enforced. Cardinal Richelieu, who believed the severity of the penalty contributed to its lack of enforcement, argued for its liberalization. An edict of February 1626 restricted the death penalty to duels in which one of the participants died, or the seconds also dueled. It was registered by parlement on 24 March. Montmorency-Bouteville dueled and killed Jacques de Matignon, Comte de Thorigny, on 25 March. He injured the Baron de la Frette in 1627, then fled to Brussels to escape the wrath of Louis XIII. Eventually Louis XIII let it be known that Montmorency-Bouteville could return to France, but not to Paris or the court.

François d'Harcourt Beuvron, a relative of Thorigny, was determined to avenge Thorigny's death. At the insistence of Louis XIII, a dinner of reconciliation was arranged in Brussels, but failed, and afterward Beuvron issued a challenge. On 12 May 1627 at the Place Royale in Paris, Montmorency-Bouteville dueled Beuvron without fatality, but Montmorency-Bouteville's second, François de Rosmadec, Comte de Chappelles, dueled and killed Beuvron's second, the Marquis de Bussi d'Amboise. While Beuvron took refuge in England, Montmorency-Bouteville and Rosmadec, despite their nobility, were beheaded at the Place de Grève in Paris on 22 June 1627.

His posthumous son, François-Henri, became a Marshal of France; his daughter Élisabeth-Angélique was married in turn to Gaspard IV de Coligny (son of Gaspard III) and Christian Ludwig I zu Mecklenburg (son of Adolf Friedrich I).
