= Chanu =

- Commune
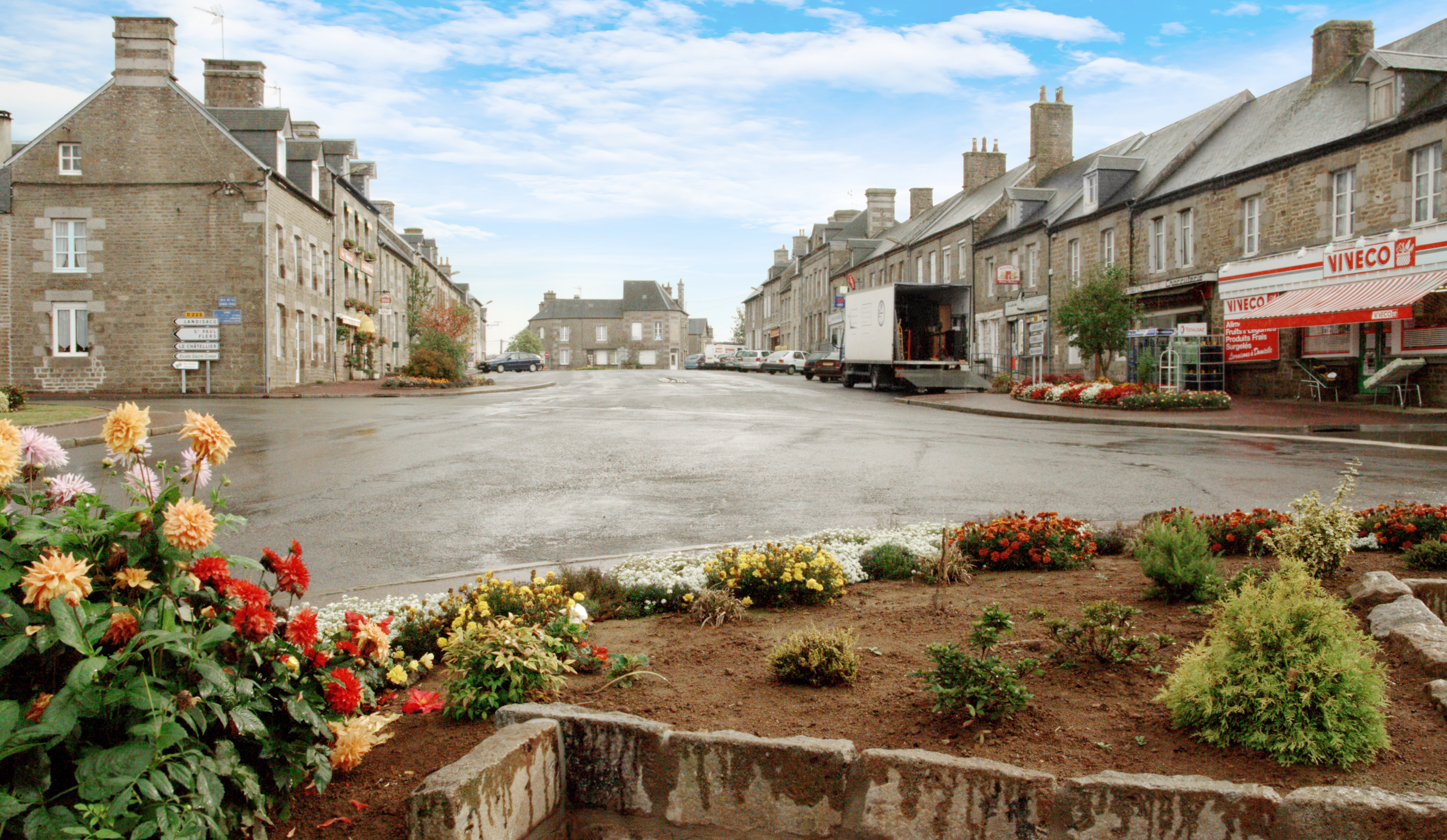
- The centre of Chanu
- Location of Chanu
- Location within France Location within Normandy
- Coordinates: 48°43′46″N 0°40′35″W
- Country: France
- Region: Normandy
- Department: Orne
- Arrondissement: Argentan
- Canton: Domfront en Poiraie
- Intercommunality: Domfront Tinchebray Interco

Government
  - Mayor (2020–2026): Michel Legalle
- Area^{1}: 15.72 km^{2} (6.07 sq mi)
- Elevation: 299 m (981 ft)
- Highest elevation: 321 m (1,053 ft)
- Lowest elevation: 226 m (741 ft)
- Population (2023): 1,243
  - Density: 79.07/km^{2} (204.8/sq mi)
- Demonym: Chanusiens
- Time zone: UTC+01:00 (CET)
  - Summer (DST): UTC+02:00 (CEST)
- INSEE/Postal code: 61093 /61800
- Website: www.chanu.eu
- ^{1} French Land Register data, which excludes lakes, ponds, glaciers > 1 km^{2} (0.386 sq mi or 247 acres) and river estuaries.

Chanu (French pronunciation: [ʃany]) is a commune in the Orne department in north-western France.

== Geography ==
The commune is made up of the following collection of villages and hamlets, La Guibourgère, Visance, La Tardivière, Chanu, Les Bissons, La Cour, Les Brousses, Le Pont Herbout, La Lanfrère and Les Fresnayes.

A river, La Visance flows through the commune. In addition three streams also traverse the commune Ruisseau du Plessis, Ruisseau de Noire Vallee and the Ruisseau de l'Aubriere.

== See also ==
- Communes of the Orne department
