= Montsecret-Clairefougère =

- Commune
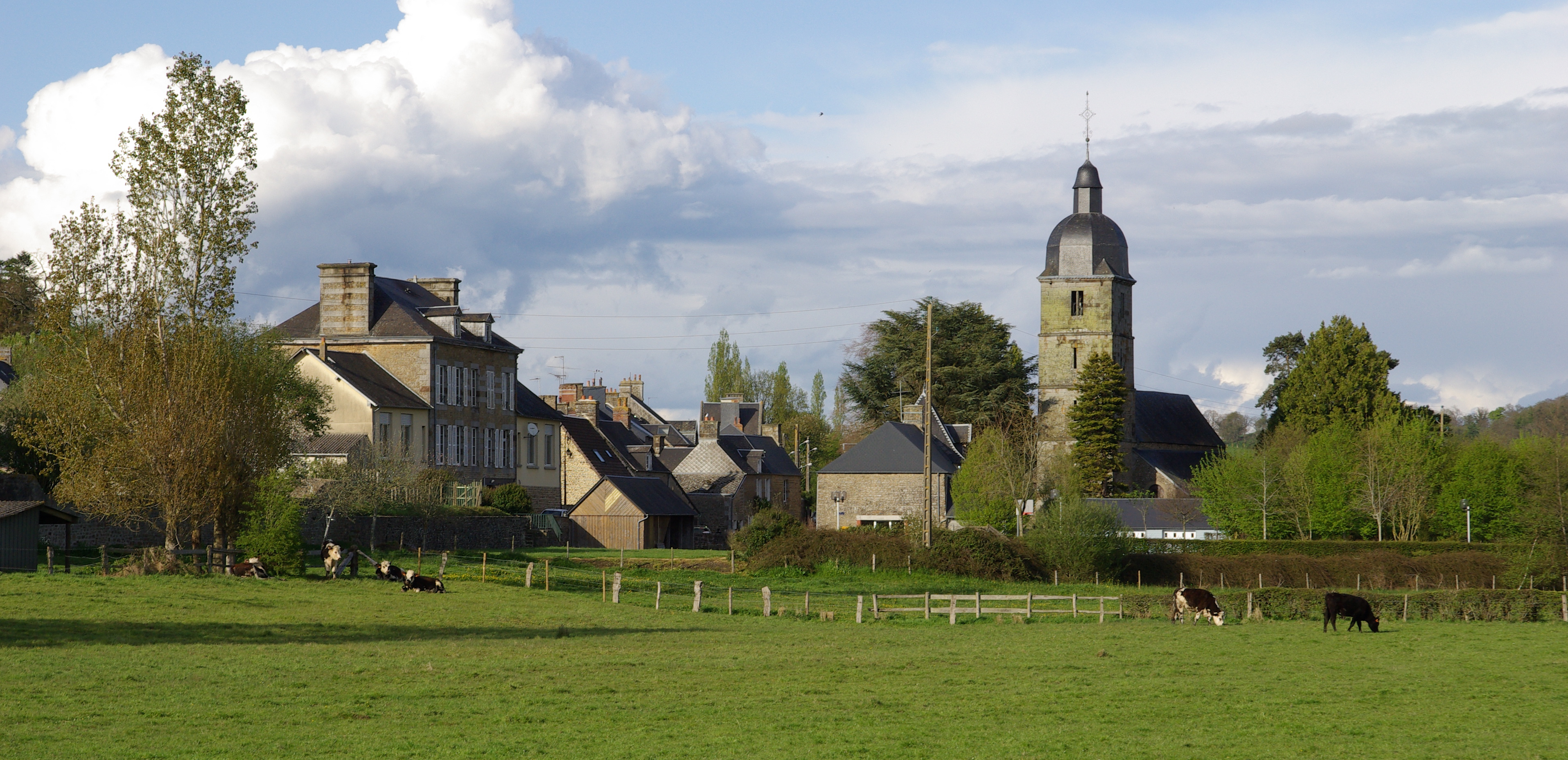
- A general view of Montsecret-Clairefougère
- Location of Montsecret-Clairefougère
- Location within France Location within Normandy
- Coordinates: 48°47′51″N 0°40′34″W
- Country: France
- Region: Normandy
- Department: Orne
- Arrondissement: Argentan
- Canton: Domfront en Poiraie

Government
  - Mayor (2020–2026): Maxime Guilmin
- Area^{1}: 13.92 km^{2} (5.37 sq mi)
- Population (2023): 667
  - Density: 47.9/km^{2} (124/sq mi)
- Time zone: UTC+01:00 (CET)
  - Summer (DST): UTC+02:00 (CEST)
- INSEE/Postal code: 61292 /61800
- ^{1} French Land Register data, which excludes lakes, ponds, glaciers > 1 km^{2} (0.386 sq mi or 247 acres) and river estuaries.

Montsecret-Clairefougère (French pronunciation: [mɔ̃səkʁɛ klɛʁfuʒɛʁ]) is a commune in the Orne department in northwestern France. It was formed in 2015 by the merger of the former communes Montsecret and Clairefougère.

== Geography ==
The commune is made up of the following collection of villages and hamlets, L'Ainerie, Cambuzo, Langrie, Clairefougère, La Prunerie, L'Aubinière, Montsecret, La Cornière, La Cingallière, Le Pont, La Mancelière and Laufrairie.

The river Noireau flows through the commune.

The commune is on the border of the area known as Suisse Normande.

== Sport ==
Montsecret-Clairefougère has a swimming pool the La piscine intercommunale de Montsecret-Clairefougère, which has been open since 1999. It is an external pool, with separate paddling pool.

== See also ==
- Communes of the Orne department
