= Saint-Cornier-des-Landes =

- Part of Tinchebray-Bocage
- Location of Saint-Cornier-des-Landes
- Location within France Location within Normandy
- Coordinates: 48°43′07″N 0°43′10″W
- Country: France
- Region: Normandy
- Department: Orne
- Arrondissement: Argentan
- Canton: Domfront
- Commune: Tinchebray-Bocage
- Area^{1}: 11.96 km^{2} (4.62 sq mi)
- Elevation: 322 m (1,056 ft)
- Highest elevation: 324 m (1,063 ft)
- Lowest elevation: 210 m (690 ft)
- Population (2022): 604
  - Density: 50.5/km^{2} (131/sq mi)
- Time zone: UTC+01:00 (CET)
  - Summer (DST): UTC+02:00 (CEST)
- Postal code: 61800
- ^{1} French Land Register data, which excludes lakes, ponds, glaciers > 1 km^{2} (0.386 sq mi or 247 acres) and river estuaries.

Saint-Cornier-des-Landes (French pronunciation: [sɛ̃ kɔʁnje de lɑ̃d]) is a former commune in the Orne department in the Normandy region in north-western France. On 1 January 2015, Saint-Cornier-des-Landes and six other communes merged becoming one commune called Tinchebray-Bocage.

== See also ==
- Communes of the Orne department
