= Saint-Gilles-des-Marais =

- Commune
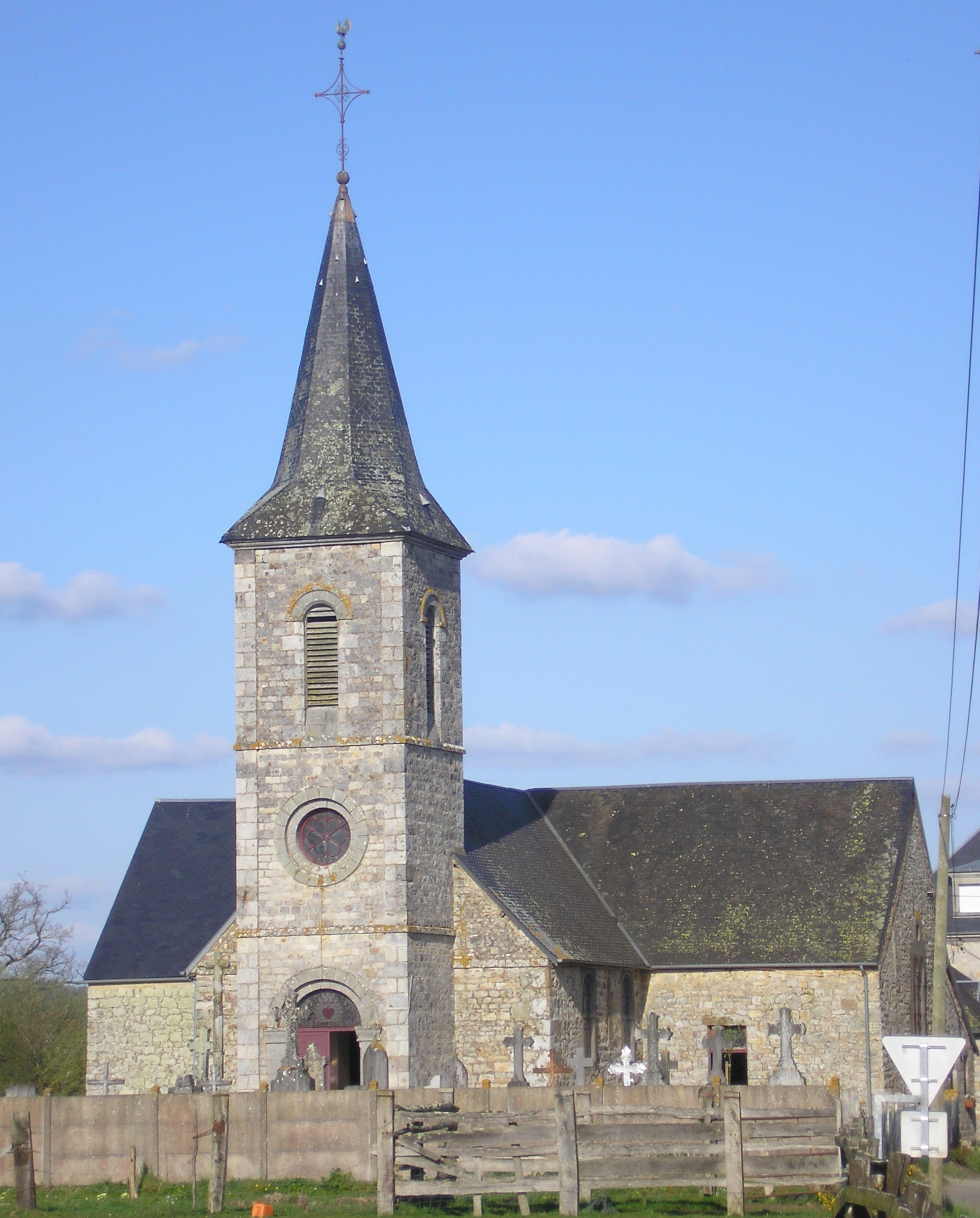
- The church in Saint-Gilles-des-Marais
- Location of Saint-Gilles-des-Marais
- Location within France Location within Normandy
- Coordinates: 48°35′01″N 0°41′34″W
- Country: France
- Region: Normandy
- Department: Orne
- Arrondissement: Argentan
- Canton: Domfront en Poiraie

Government
  - Mayor (2020–2026): Pierre Férard
- Area^{1}: 5.92 km^{2} (2.29 sq mi)
- Elevation: 130 m (430 ft)
- Highest elevation: 134 m (440 ft)
- Lowest elevation: 116 m (381 ft)
- Population (2023): 106
  - Density: 17.9/km^{2} (46.4/sq mi)
- Time zone: UTC+01:00 (CET)
  - Summer (DST): UTC+02:00 (CEST)
- INSEE/Postal code: 61401 /61700
- ^{1} French Land Register data, which excludes lakes, ponds, glaciers > 1 km^{2} (0.386 sq mi or 247 acres) and river estuaries.

Saint-Gilles-des-Marais (French pronunciation: [sɛ̃ ʒil de maʁɛ]) is a commune in the Orne department in north-western France.

== Geography ==
The river Égrenne flows through the commune.

The commune is in the Normandie-Maine Regional Natural Park.

== See also ==
- Communes of the Orne department
- Parc naturel régional Normandie-Maine
