= Saint-Brice, Orne =

Saint-Brice
- Commune
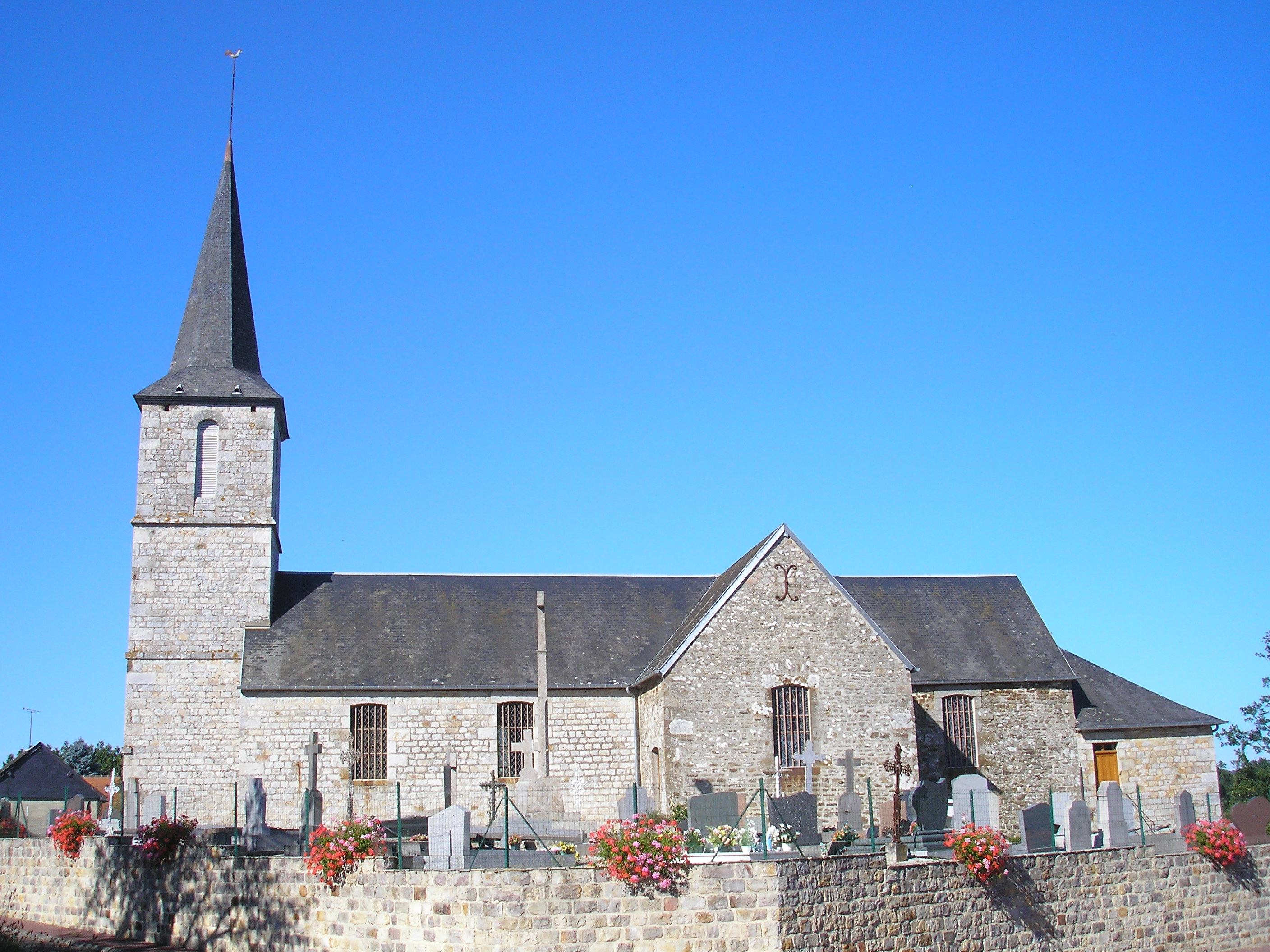
- The church in Saint-Brice
- Location of Saint-Brice
- Location within France Location within Normandy
- Coordinates: 48°33′34″N 0°38′27″W
- Country: France
- Region: Normandy
- Department: Orne
- Arrondissement: Argentan
- Canton: Domfront en Poiraie

Government
  - Mayor (2020–2026): Serge Costard
- Area^{1}: 4.58 km^{2} (1.77 sq mi)
- Elevation: 137 m (449 ft)
- Highest elevation: 271 m (889 ft)
- Lowest elevation: 120 m (390 ft)
- Population (2023): 150
  - Density: 33/km^{2} (85/sq mi)
- Time zone: UTC+01:00 (CET)
  - Summer (DST): UTC+02:00 (CEST)
- INSEE/Postal code: 61370 /61700
- ^{1} French Land Register data, which excludes lakes, ponds, glaciers > 1 km^{2} (0.386 sq mi or 247 acres) and river estuaries.

Saint-Brice (French pronunciation: [sɛ̃ bʁis]) is a commune in the Orne department in north-western France.

== Geography ==
The commune is within the Normandie-Maine Regional Natural Park.

A stream the Ruisseau de bavaux runs through the commune.

== Points of interest ==
=== National heritage sites ===
- Logis de la Cousinière is a thirteenth century house, that was registered as a Monument historique in 1974.

== See also ==
- Communes of the Orne department
- Parc naturel régional Normandie-Maine
