= Montsecret =

Commune in Orne, France

- Part of Montsecret-Clairefougère
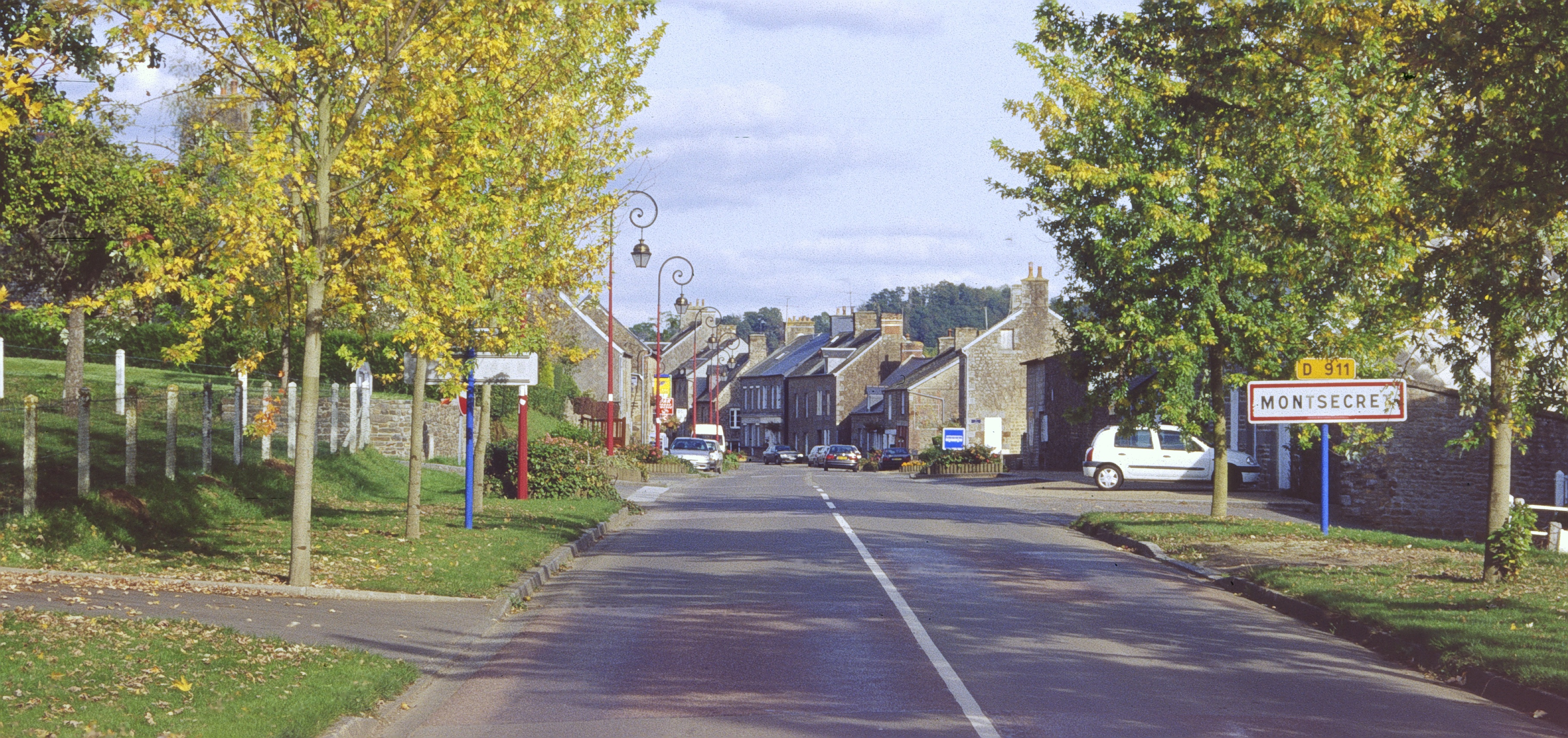
- Location of Montsecret
- Location within France Location within Normandy
- Coordinates: 48°47′54″N 0°40′30″W
- Country: France
- Region: Normandy
- Department: Orne
- Arrondissement: Argentan
- Canton: Domfront
- Commune: Montsecret-Clairefougère
- Area^{1}: 10.64 km^{2} (4.11 sq mi)
- Elevation: 146 m (479 ft)
- Highest elevation: 242 m (794 ft)
- Lowest elevation: 115 m (377 ft)
- Population (2022): 529
  - Density: 49.7/km^{2} (129/sq mi)
- Demonym: Montsecréens
- Time zone: UTC+01:00 (CET)
  - Summer (DST): UTC+02:00 (CEST)
- Postal code: 61800
- ^{1} French Land Register data, which excludes lakes, ponds, glaciers > 1 km^{2} (0.386 sq mi or 247 acres) and river estuaries.

Montsecret (French pronunciation: [mɔ̃səkʁɛ]) is a former commune in the Orne department in north-western France. In 2015, it became part of Montsecret-Clairefougère.

== See also ==
- Communes of the Orne department
