= Égrenne =

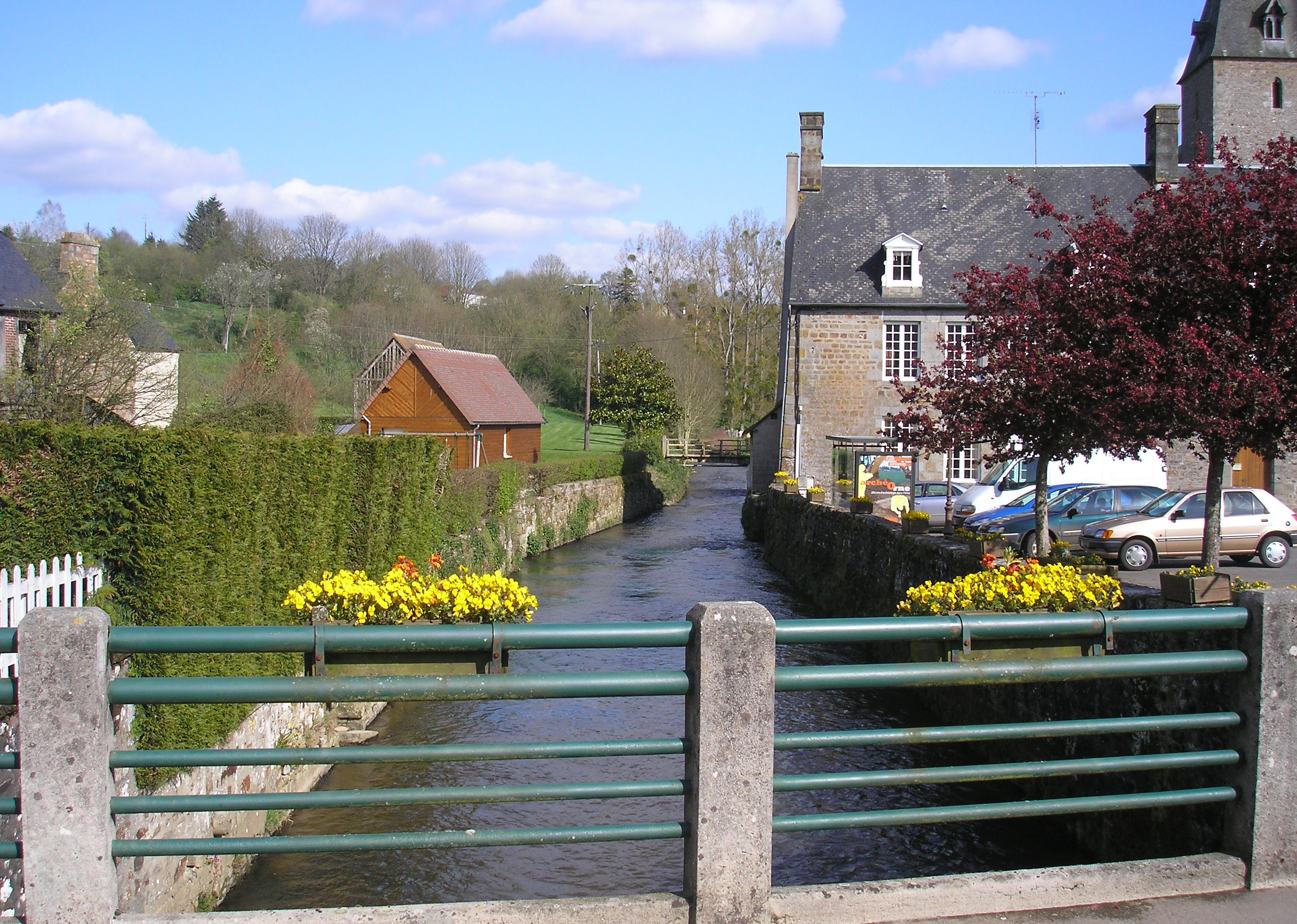
- The Égrenne flowing through Lonlay-l'Abbaye

Location
- Country: France

Physical characteristics
- Mouth: Varenne
  - coordinates: 48°33′10″N 0°42′10″W
- Length: 36.69 km (22.80 mi)

The Égrenne is a 36.69 km (22.80 mi) long river in Normandy, France located in the departments of Orne and Manche. It is a tributary of the river Varenne. The rivers source is located in the commune of Chaulieu.

The river flows through the following communes:

1. Chaulieu
2. Domfront en Poiraie
3. Ger
4. Le Fresne-Poret
5. Lonlay-l'Abbaye
6. Saint-Christophe-de-Chaulieu
7. Saint-Gilles-des-Marais
8. Saint-Mars-d'Égrenne
9. Sourdeval
10. Tinchebray-Bocage
