= Avrilly, Orne =

Avrilly
- Commune
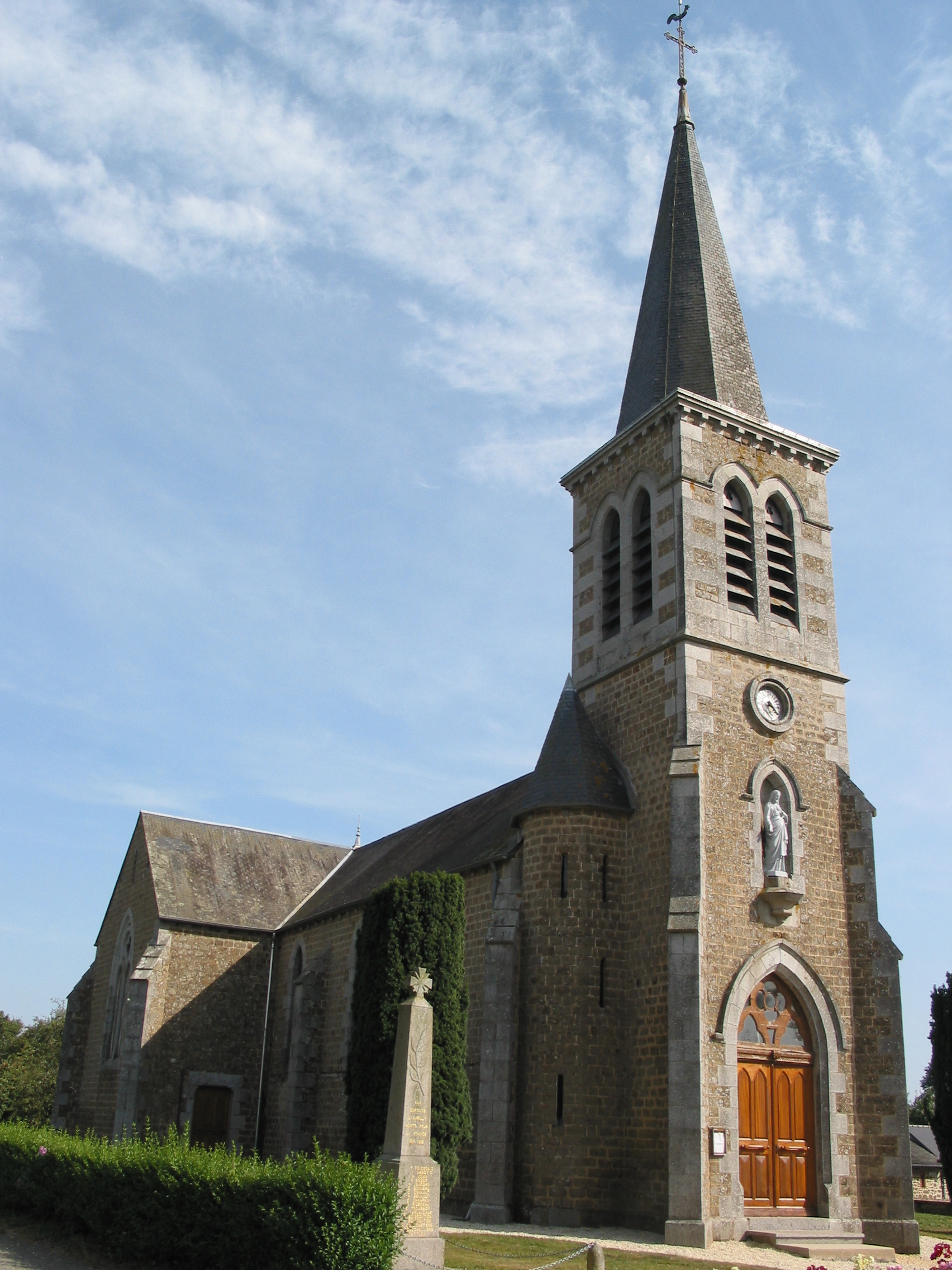
- The church in Avrilly
- Location of Avrilly
- Location within France Location within Normandy
- Coordinates: 48°32′24″N 0°36′48″W
- Country: France
- Region: Normandy
- Department: Orne
- Arrondissement: Alençon
- Canton: Domfront en Poiraie
- Intercommunality: Domfront Tinchebray Interco

Government
  - Mayor (2020–2026): Christian Picard
- Area^{1}: 5.50 km^{2} (2.12 sq mi)
- Elevation: 200 m (660 ft)
- Highest elevation: 245 m (804 ft)
- Lowest elevation: 139 m (456 ft)
- Population (2023): 92
  - Density: 17/km^{2} (43/sq mi)
- Time zone: UTC+01:00 (CET)
  - Summer (DST): UTC+02:00 (CEST)
- INSEE/Postal code: 61021 /61700
- ^{1} French Land Register data, which excludes lakes, ponds, glaciers > 1 km^{2} (0.386 sq mi or 247 acres) and river estuaries.

Avrilly (French pronunciation: [avʁiji]) is a commune in the Orne department in northwestern France.

== Geography ==
The commune is in the Normandie-Maine Regional Natural Park.

A stream the Ruisseau de bavaux runs through the commune.

== Population ==
Historical population
Year	Pop.	±% p.a.
1968	185	—
1975	166	−1.54%
1982	173	+0.59%
1990	160	−0.97%
1999	136	−1.79%
2007	123	−1.25%
2012	136	+2.03%
2017	107	−4.68%
2023	92	−2.49%
Source: INSEE

== Notable buildings and places ==
=== National heritage sites ===
- Manoir de la Fosse is a 17th-century Manor house, declared as a Monument historique in 1995.

== See also ==
- Communes of the Orne department
- Parc naturel régional Normandie-Maine
