= Guy Degrenne =

French businessman (1925–2006)

- Born: 3 August 1925; Tinchebray, France
- Died: 7 November 2006 (aged 81); Granville, France
- Education: ESSEC Business School
- Occupation: Industrialist

Guy Degrenne (3 August 1925 – 7 November 2006) was a French businessman who specialised in cutlery and silverware. He has founded the Guy Degrenne group, since 1987 a subsidiary of holding 'Table de France'.

== Biography ==
Guy Degrenne was born in Tinchebray (Orne). He attended Collège Saint-Joseph in Caen, then studied at ESSEC Business School, and took up his father's steel factory (at Sourdeval) in 1948.

Guy Degrenne first has war-left steel parts collected, and turns them in stainless steel dishes, with instant commercial success. By 1958, Guy Degrenne sets up a tableware business, then by 1963 ushers in the luxury tableware business, in copying the standards of Parisian goldsmiths.

In 1967, part of the production is moved to a new factory in Vire (Calvados). His business then employs about 600 workers. In 1978, Degrenne meets national recognition with a popular advert reminiscent of his school years : a headmaster catches young Degrenne drawing dishes in his notebooks margin, and then warns him against ill-success (Ce n'est pas comme cela que vous réussirez dans la vie).
