= Saint-Mars-d'Égrenne =

- Commune
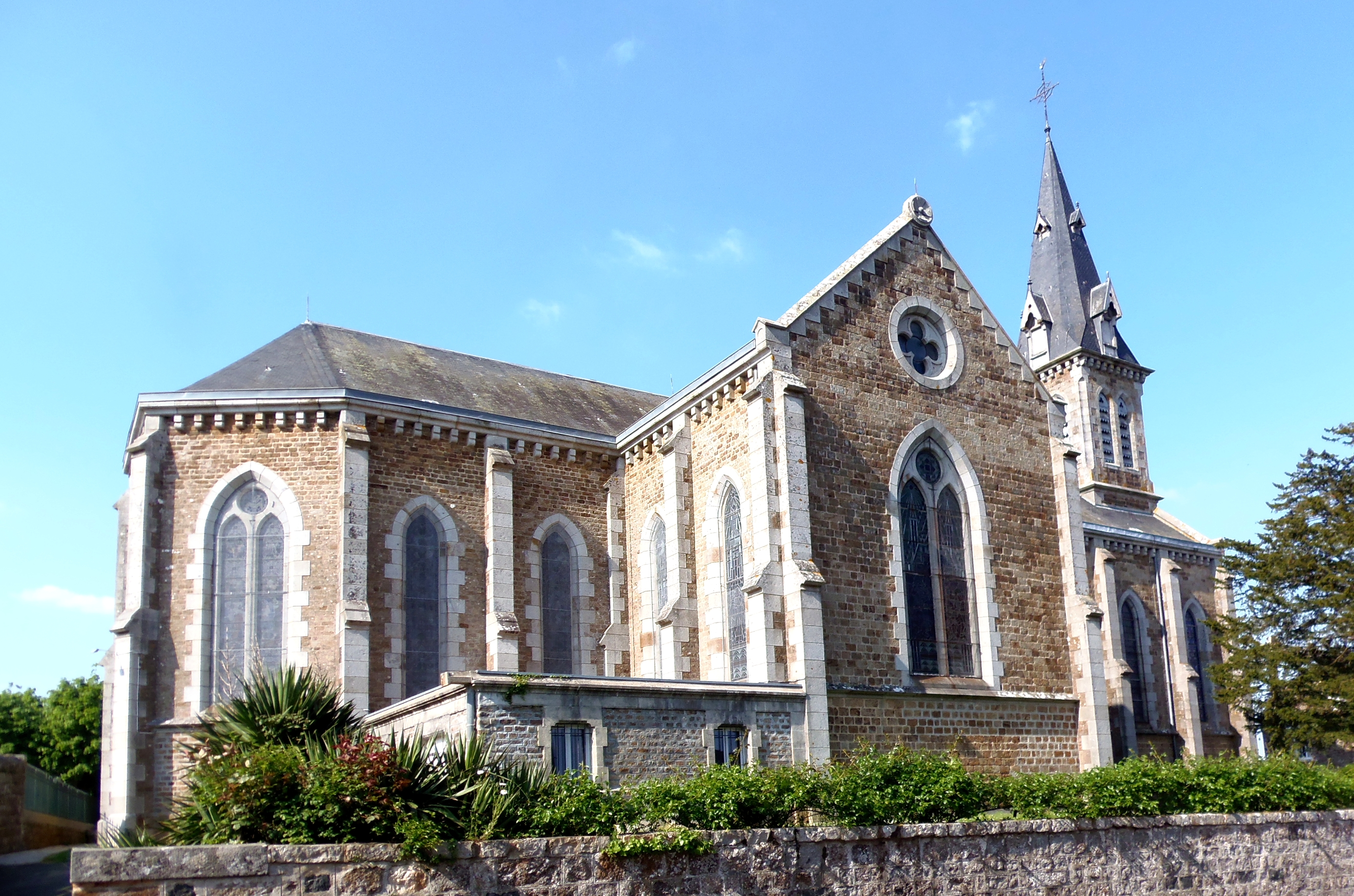
- The church in Saint-Mars-d'Égrenne
- Location of Saint-Mars-d'Égrenne
- Location within France Location within Normandy
- Coordinates: 48°33′40″N 0°43′43″W
- Country: France
- Region: Normandy
- Department: Orne
- Arrondissement: Alençon
- Canton: Bagnoles de l'Orne Normandie

Government
  - Mayor (2020–2026): Daniel Boulent
- Area^{1}: 25.06 km^{2} (9.68 sq mi)
- Elevation: 134 m (440 ft)
- Highest elevation: 201 m (659 ft)
- Lowest elevation: 113 m (371 ft)
- Population (2023): 630
  - Density: 25/km^{2} (65/sq mi)
- Time zone: UTC+01:00 (CET)
  - Summer (DST): UTC+02:00 (CEST)
- INSEE/Postal code: 61421 /61350
- ^{1} French Land Register data, which excludes lakes, ponds, glaciers > 1 km^{2} (0.386 sq mi or 247 acres) and river estuaries.

Saint-Mars-d'Égrenne (French pronunciation: [sɛ̃ maʁ deɡʁɛn]) is a commune in the Orne department in north-western France.

== Geography ==
The commune is made up of the following collection of villages and hamlets, Le Pont d'Égrenne, Saint-Mars-d'Égrenne, La Runchetière, La Tabultière, La Bouhardière and Le Prémorel.

Thwo rivers the Varenne and the Égrenne flow through the commune.

The commune is in the Normandie-Maine Regional Natural Park.

== See also ==
- Communes of the Orne department
