= Ger, Manche =

Ger
- Commune
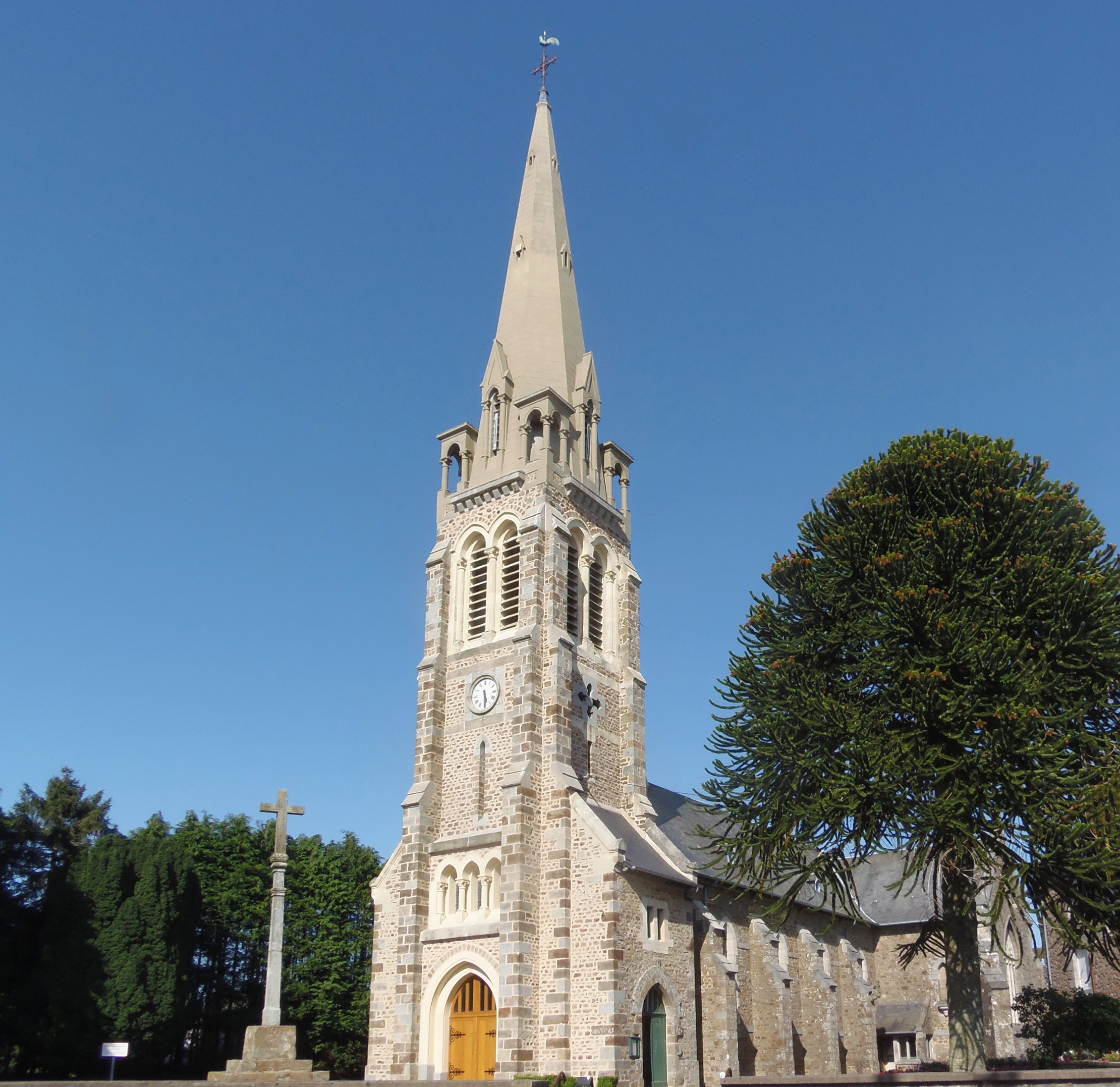
- The church of Saint-Matthieu

- Coat of arms
- Location of Ger
- Location within France Location within Normandy
- Coordinates: 48°40′57″N 0°47′15″W
- Country: France
- Region: Normandy
- Department: Manche
- Arrondissement: Avranches
- Canton: Le Mortainais
- Intercommunality: CA Mont-Saint-Michel-Normandie

Government
  - Mayor (2020–2026): Michel Prieur
- Area^{1}: 39.78 km^{2} (15.36 sq mi)
- Elevation: 343 m (1,125 ft)
- Highest elevation: 341 m (1,119 ft)
- Lowest elevation: 162 m (531 ft)
- Population (2023): 824
  - Density: 20.7/km^{2} (53.6/sq mi)
- Demonym: Gérois
- Time zone: UTC+01:00 (CET)
  - Summer (DST): UTC+02:00 (CEST)
- INSEE/Postal code: 50200 /50850
- ^{1} French Land Register data, which excludes lakes, ponds, glaciers > 1 km^{2} (0.386 sq mi or 247 acres) and river estuaries.

Ger (French pronunciation: [ʒɛʁ]) is a commune in the Manche department in north-western France. The Musée régional de la poterie (regional pottery museum) is located in the commune.

== Geography ==
The commune is made up of the following collection of villages and hamlets, La Grande Roche, Ger, Les Loges, L'Être au Lièvre, Le Bouillonnet, La Côtière, La Buissonnière, Le Planitre, La Croix Robine, La Croix Lecomte, La Prise Boulay and La Cosnerie.

The river Égrenne flows through the commune.

The commune is in the Normandie-Maine Regional Natural Park.

== Points of Interest ==
=== Museums ===
- Musée de la céramique – centre de création is a museum focused on pottery produced in the area from the 14th to early 20th century. The museum has been open to the public since 1997.

== See also ==
- Communes of the Manche department
- Parc naturel régional Normandie-Maine
