= Musée régional de la poterie, Ger =

Coordinates: 48.6881°N 0.8367°W

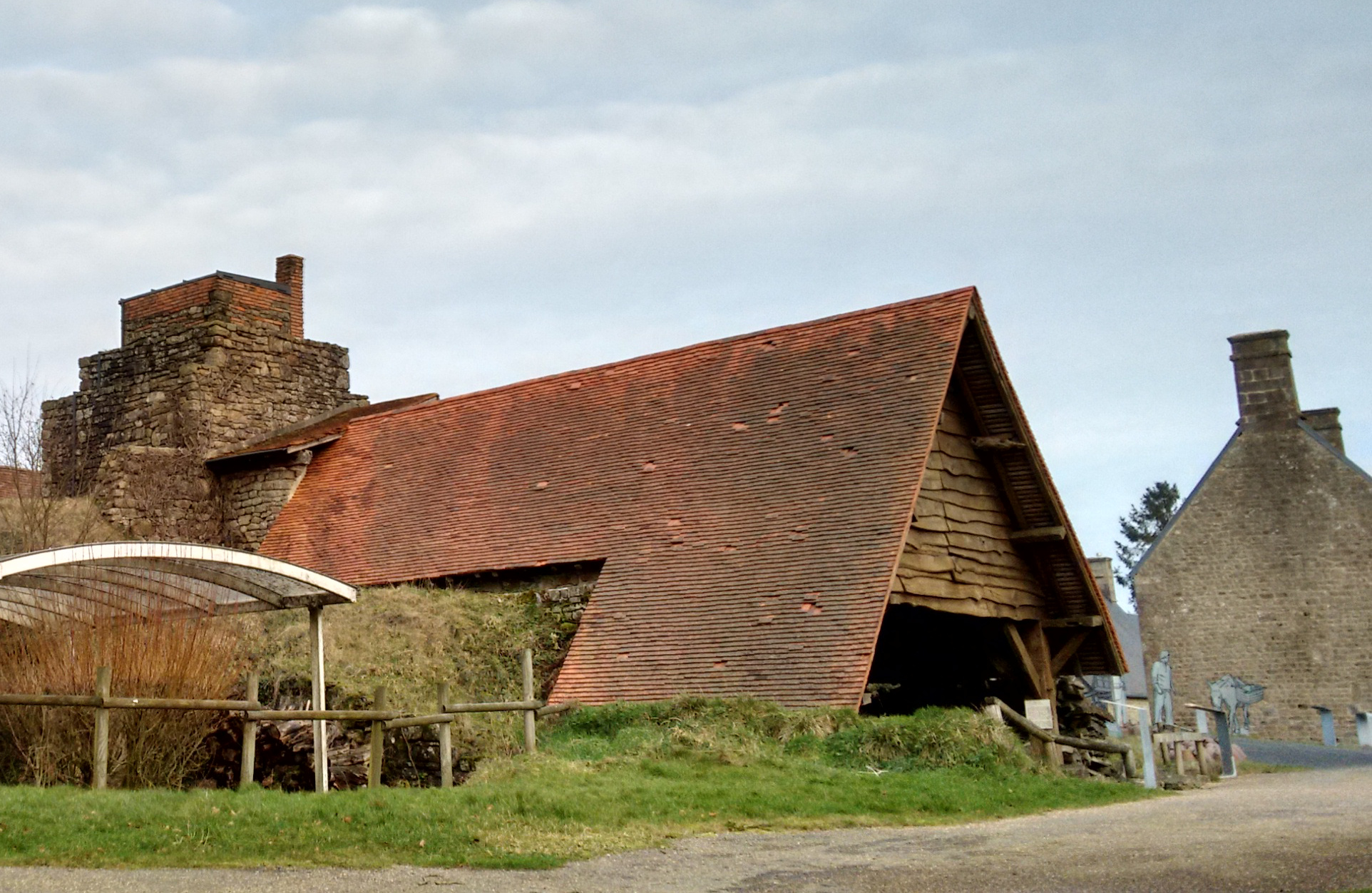
Tunnel kiln at the Musee regional de la poterie in Ger

The Musée régional de la poterie (Regional Pottery Museum), is located next to the town of Ger, in the French department of the Manche. The exhibits focus on pottery produced in the area from the 14th to early 20th century.

== History ==
Potters were attracted to the Ger area due to the availability of clay and wood. In the 18th century, potters formed associations around large tunnel kilns, and by the 19th century there were 21 such associations in the Ger area employing 700 people. The museum is located in the restored buildings of Le Placitre, a pottery production site that was run by the Véron and Esneu families. When ceramics were largely replaced by other materials in the early 20th century, pottery manufacture died out in Ger. In 1988, the Conseil général de la Manche invested in restoration of Le Placitre buildings and in archaeological research. The museum opened to the public in 1997.

== Visiting the museum ==
The museum has a collection of over 3000 pieces of stoneware from Ger and other sites in Lower Normandy. In addition, visitors can see the restored buildings and the kiln used by potters in the 19th century. The Museum also offers a small collection of contemporary ceramics.
