= Frênes =

- Part of Tinchebray-Bocage
- Location of Frênes
- Location within France Location within Normandy
- Coordinates: 48°47′06″N 0°40′55″W
- Country: France
- Region: Normandy
- Department: Orne
- Arrondissement: Argentan
- Canton: Domfront
- Commune: Tinchebray-Bocage
- Area^{1}: 13.31 km^{2} (5.14 sq mi)
- Elevation: 160 m (520 ft)
- Highest elevation: 303 m (994 ft)
- Lowest elevation: 132 m (433 ft)
- Population (2022): 870
  - Density: 65/km^{2} (170/sq mi)
- Time zone: UTC+01:00 (CET)
  - Summer (DST): UTC+02:00 (CEST)
- Postal code: 61800
- ^{1} French Land Register data, which excludes lakes, ponds, glaciers > 1 km^{2} (0.386 sq mi or 247 acres) and river estuaries.

Frênes (French pronunciation: [fʁɛn]) is a former commune in the Orne department in the Normandy region in north-western France. On 1 January 2015, Frênes and six other communes merged becoming one commune called Tinchebray-Bocage.

== See also ==
- Communes of the Orne department
