= Jean-Baptiste Quéruel =

French inventor

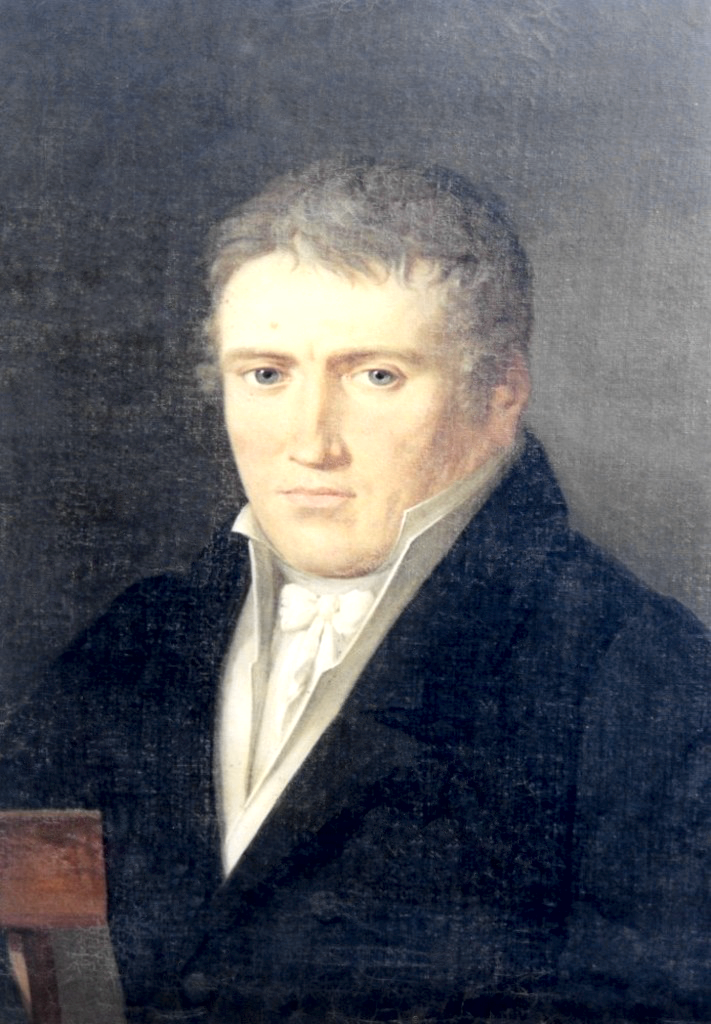
- Born: November 24, 1779; Saint-Quentin-les-Chardonnets, Normandy, France
- Died: June 20, 1845; Tinchebray
- Known for: Producing sugar from beets

Jean-Baptiste Quéruel (23 November 1779 – 20 June 1845) was the inventor of the method for industrial production of sugar from beet.

Quéruel was born on 23 November 1779 in Normandy at the hamlet of La Perrochère in Saint-Quentin-les-Chardonnets, the son of Jacques Queruel and Marie Anne Lebarbé (or Lebarbey).

Around the beginning of the 19th century, Quéruel was hired by Benjamin Delessert in his sugar factory at Passy, where he succeeded, by the end of 1811, in developing the process that would lead to the manufacture of sugar on an industrial scale from sugar beet, providing for the first time the impetus for the mass-production of this new sort of sugar.

Quéruel had married, on 22 April 1815 in Paris, Françoise Marie Lebaudy, the daughter of Pierre and Marie Jeanne Lebaudy Gallier, and the cousin of the prominent Lebaudy family of sugar-makers. He died on 20 June 1845 in his home of La Bichetière, in Tinchebray, and was buried with his wife in the cemetery of Les Montiers. His birthplace still exists, with a street of Tinchebray given his name.

https://gaia.orne.fr/mdr/index.php/docnumViewer/calculHierarchieDocNum/372329/1057:358363:371981:372329/1080/1920
