= Saint-Jean-des-Bois =

- Part of Tinchebray-Bocage
- Location of Saint-Jean-des-Bois
- Location within France Location within Normandy
- Coordinates: 48°43′25″N 0°47′29″W
- Country: France
- Region: Normandy
- Department: Orne
- Arrondissement: Argentan
- Canton: Domfront
- Commune: Tinchebray-Bocage
- Area^{1}: 9.93 km^{2} (3.83 sq mi)
- Elevation: 250 m (820 ft)
- Highest elevation: 322 m (1,056 ft)
- Lowest elevation: 188 m (617 ft)
- Population (2022): 179
  - Density: 18.0/km^{2} (46.7/sq mi)
- Time zone: UTC+01:00 (CET)
  - Summer (DST): UTC+02:00 (CEST)
- Postal code: 61800
- ^{1} French Land Register data, which excludes lakes, ponds, glaciers > 1 km^{2} (0.386 sq mi or 247 acres) and river estuaries.

Saint-Jean-des-Bois (French pronunciation: [sɛ̃ ʒɑ̃ de bwa]) is a former commune in the Orne department in the Normandy region in north-western France. On 1 January 2015, Saint-Jean-des-Bois and six other communes merged becoming one commune called Tinchebray-Bocage.

== See also ==
- Communes of the Orne department
