= Le Ménil-Ciboult =

- Commune
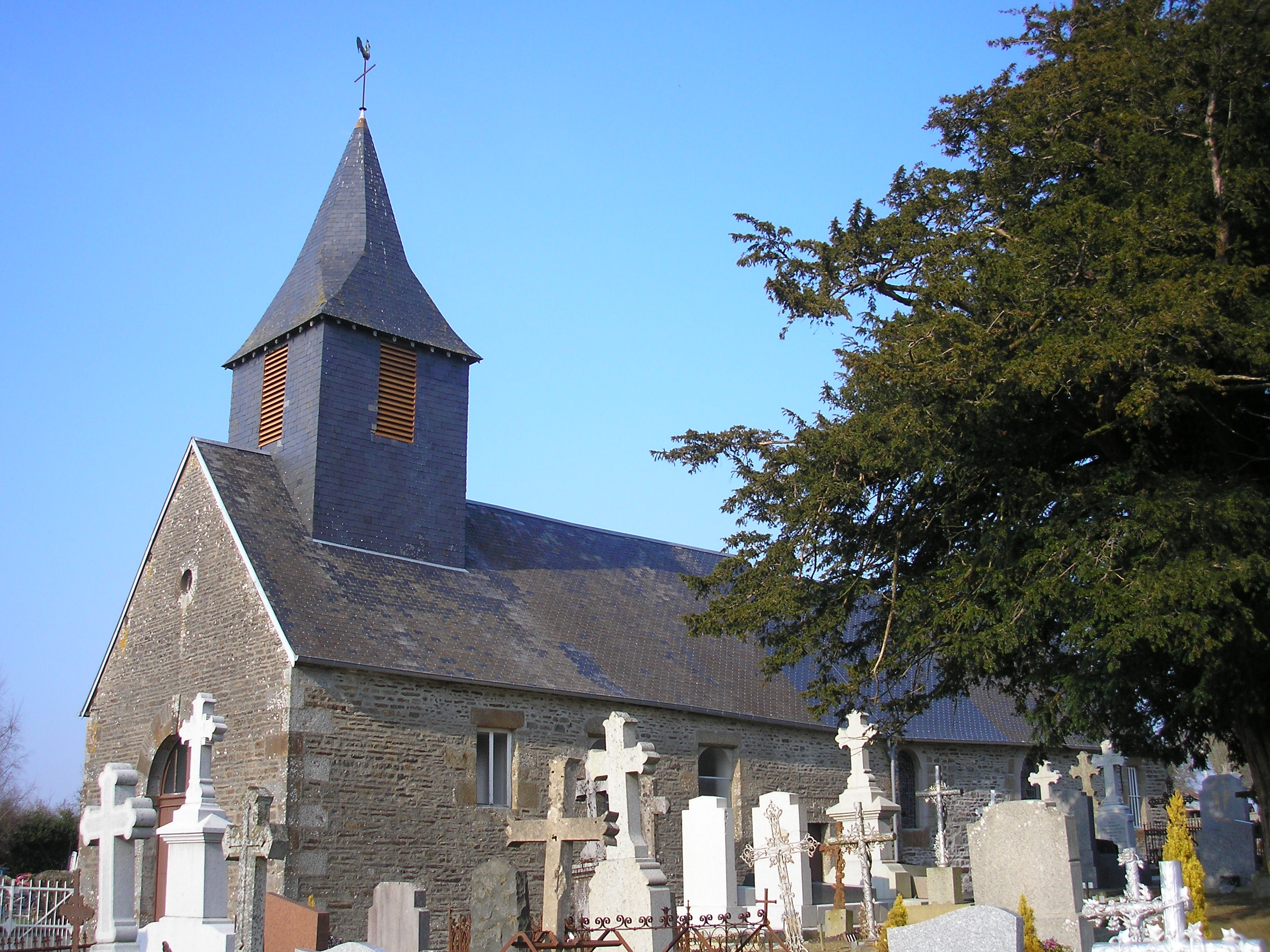
- The church in Le Ménil-Ciboult
- Location of Le Ménil-Ciboult
- Location within France Location within Normandy
- Coordinates: 48°45′54″N 0°47′20″W
- Country: France
- Region: Normandy
- Department: Orne
- Arrondissement: Argentan
- Canton: Domfront en Poiraie
- Intercommunality: Domfront Tinchebray Interco

Government
  - Mayor (2020–2026): Philippe Lepont
- Area^{1}: 6.31 km^{2} (2.44 sq mi)
- Highest elevation: 322 m (1,056 ft)
- Lowest elevation: 245 m (804 ft)
- Population (2023): 126
  - Density: 20.0/km^{2} (51.7/sq mi)
- Time zone: UTC+01:00 (CET)
  - Summer (DST): UTC+02:00 (CEST)
- INSEE/Postal code: 61262 /61800
- ^{1} French Land Register data, which excludes lakes, ponds, glaciers > 1 km^{2} (0.386 sq mi or 247 acres) and river estuaries.

Le Ménil-Ciboult (French pronunciation: [lə menil sibu]) is a commune in the Orne department in north-western France.

== Geography ==
The river Noireau flows through the commune.

== See also ==
- Communes of the Orne department
