= Donjon de Vire =

Coordinates: 48°50′08″N 0°53′31″W

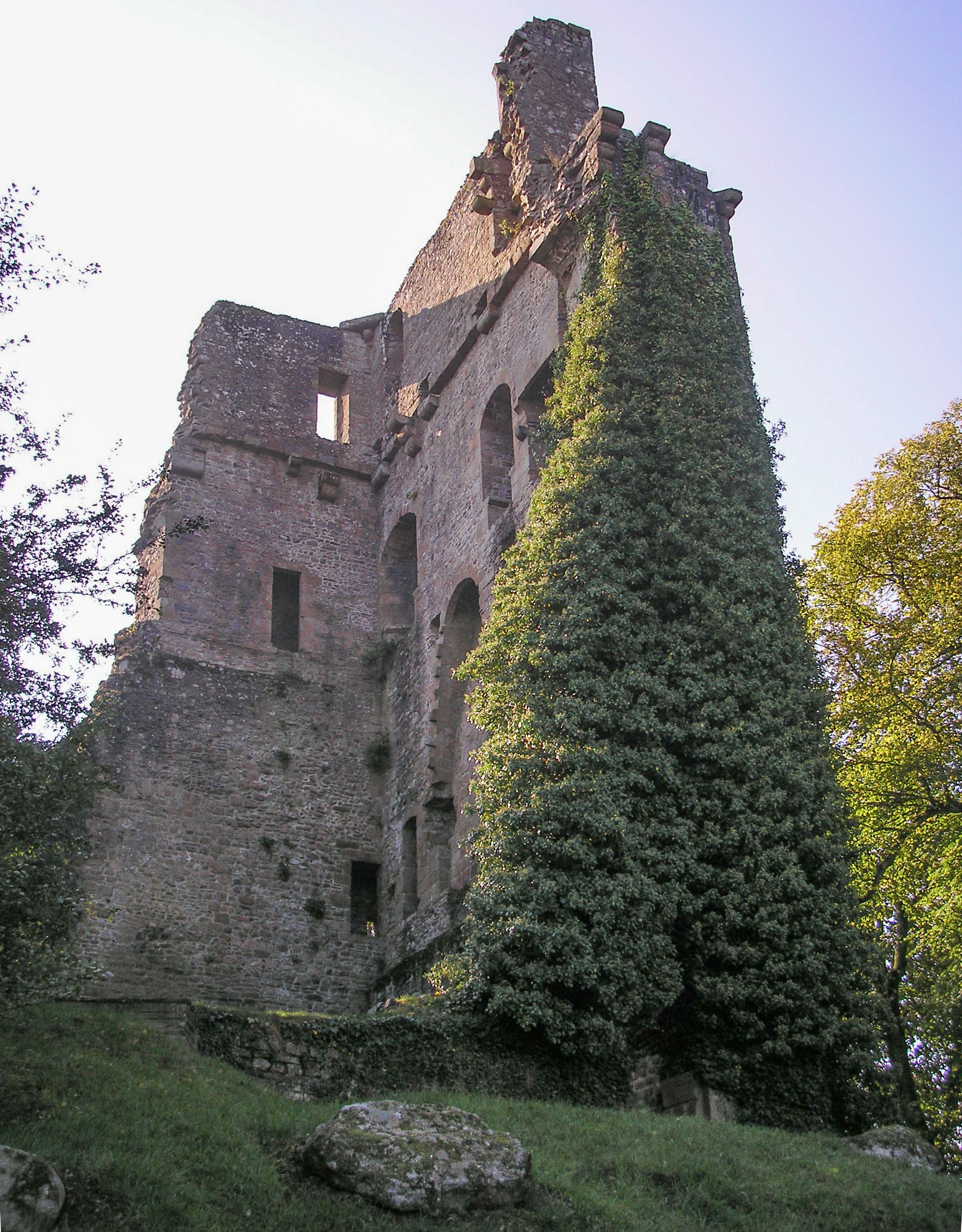
Donjon de Vire

The Donjon de Vire (Vire Keep) is a ruined building situated in the commune of Vire in the Calvados département of France. The keep is the main vestige of an 11th-century castle.

== Location ==
The keep is situated in the centre of the town of Vire.

== Description ==
The keep stands on a rock at the end of a promontory overlooking the Vire river. It had a storeroom on the ground floor and two floors for the accommodation of the commander and his family. The third floor accommodated troops and there was also a fourth floor. The present remains are one of the facades and buttresses.

== History ==
It was built in 1123 by Henry I of Beauclerc. The castle was subjected to a number of sieges and captured on several occasions during the Hundred Years' War between France and England. It was finally taken by the French on 23 April 1450. In 1630, it was demolished by order of Cardinal Richelieu.

The structure was classified as a monument historique on 10 February 1913. It is the property of the commune.

== See also ==
- List of castles in France
