= Saint-Quentin-les-Chardonnets =

- Commune
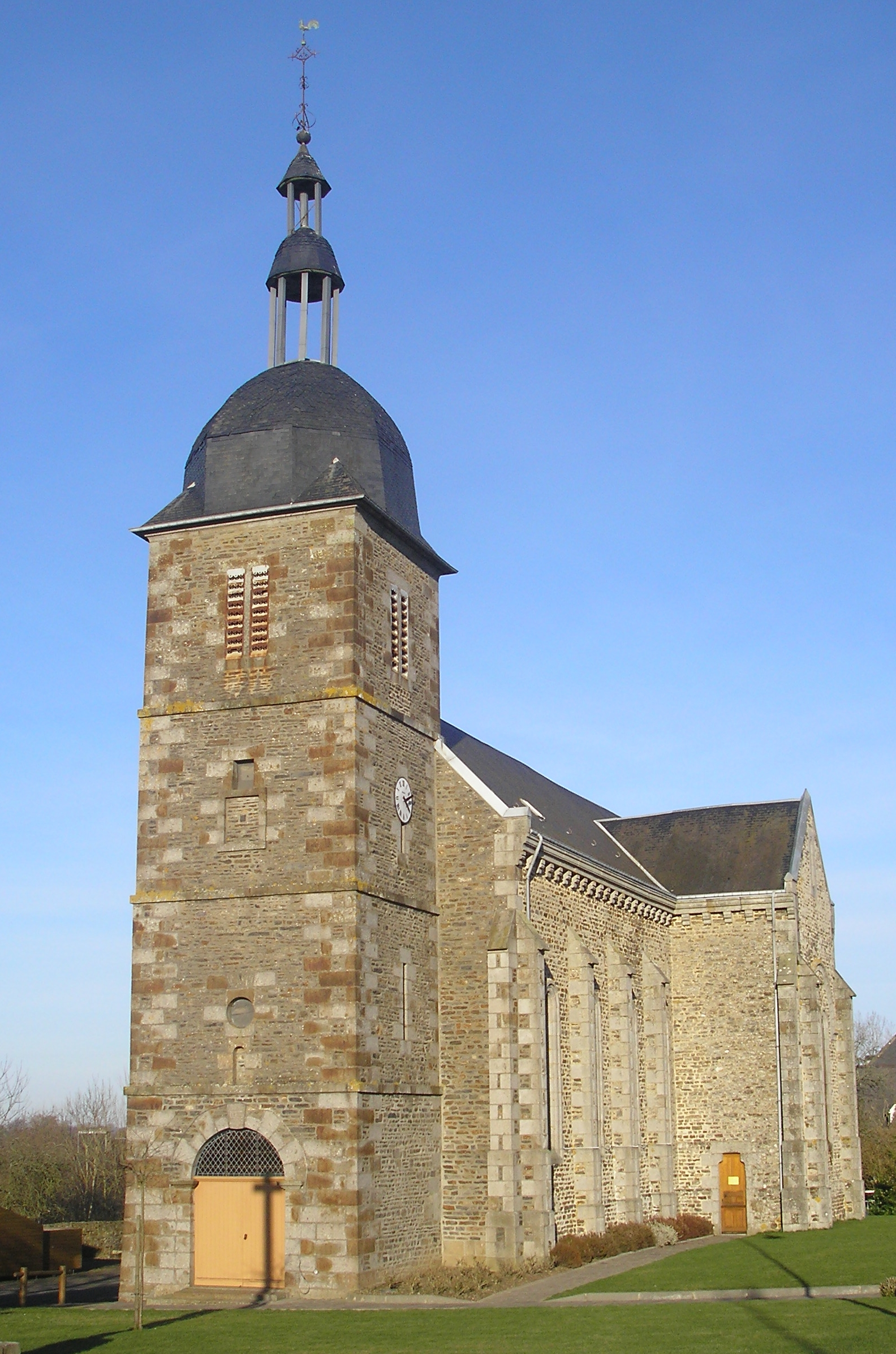
- The church in Saint-Quentin-les-Chardonnets
- Location of Saint-Quentin-les-Chardonnets
- Location within France Location within Normandy
- Coordinates: 48°47′07″N 0°45′28″W
- Country: France
- Region: Normandy
- Department: Orne
- Arrondissement: Argentan
- Canton: Domfront en Poiraie

Government
  - Mayor (2020–2026): Sébastien Chrétien
- Area^{1}: 9 km^{2} (3.5 sq mi)
- Elevation: 220 m (720 ft)
- Highest elevation: 286 m (938 ft)
- Lowest elevation: 152 m (499 ft)
- Population (2023): 322
  - Density: 36/km^{2} (93/sq mi)
- Time zone: UTC+01:00 (CET)
  - Summer (DST): UTC+02:00 (CEST)
- INSEE/Postal code: 61451 /61800
- ^{1} French Land Register data, which excludes lakes, ponds, glaciers > 1 km^{2} (0.386 sq mi or 247 acres) and river estuaries.

Saint-Quentin-les-Chardonnets (French pronunciation: [sɛ̃ kɑ̃tɛ̃ le ʃaʁdɔnɛ]) is a commune in the Orne department in north-western France.

== Geography ==
The commune is made up of the following collection of villages and hamlets, Le Vivier, La Vallée, La Quérullière, La Houlette, Saint-Quentin-les-Chardonnets, La Perrochère, Les Domaines, Le Bouillon, La Morousière, La Dauphinière and La Vrainière.

== Points of Interest ==
- Musée d'Andy et Wendy Fowler is a museum dedicated to Wireless vintage radios, Avon bottles and the mechanism of the old bell tower clock from the church opposite that first opened in 2004.

== Notable people ==
- Jean-Baptiste Quéruel (1779 -1845) the inventor of the method for industrial production of sugar from beet was born here.

== See also ==
- Communes of the Orne department
