= Saint-Christophe-de-Chaulieu =

- Commune
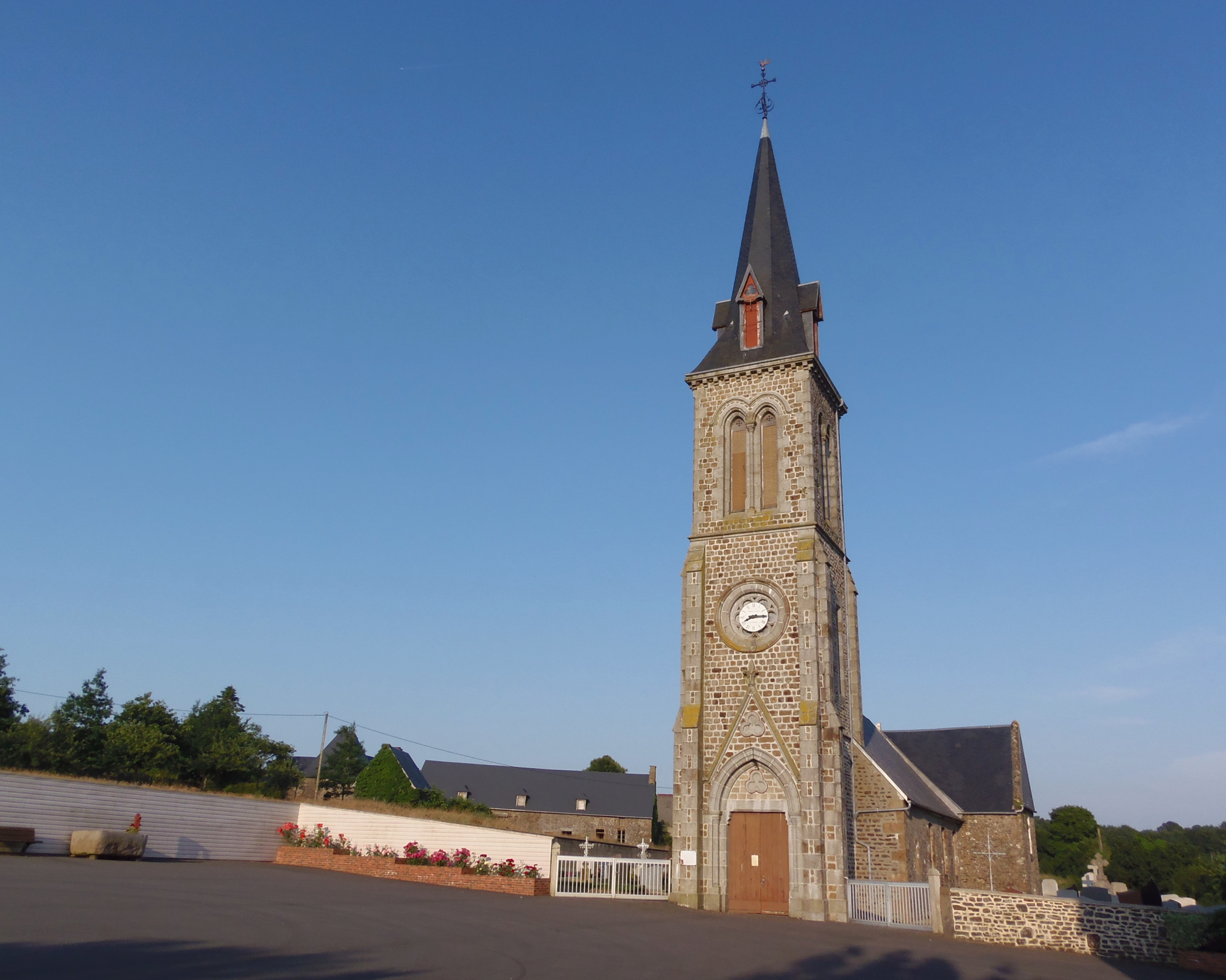
- The church in Saint-Christophe-de-Chaulieu
- Location of Saint-Christophe-de-Chaulieu
- Location within France Location within Normandy
- Coordinates: 48°44′48″N 0°49′07″W
- Country: France
- Region: Normandy
- Department: Orne
- Arrondissement: Argentan
- Canton: Domfront en Poiraie

Government
  - Mayor (2020–2026): Jean-Yves Prieur
- Area^{1}: 6.51 km^{2} (2.51 sq mi)
- Elevation: 350 m (1,150 ft)
- Highest elevation: 367 m (1,204 ft)
- Lowest elevation: 224 m (735 ft)
- Population (2023): 84
  - Density: 13/km^{2} (33/sq mi)
- Time zone: UTC+01:00 (CET)
  - Summer (DST): UTC+02:00 (CEST)
- INSEE/Postal code: 61374 /61800
- ^{1} French Land Register data, which excludes lakes, ponds, glaciers > 1 km^{2} (0.386 sq mi or 247 acres) and river estuaries.

Saint-Christophe-de-Chaulieu (French pronunciation: [sɛ̃ kʁistɔf də ʃoljø], literally Saint-Christophe of Chaulieu) is a commune in the Orne department in north-western France.

== Geography ==
The source of the Noireau river is in this commune. In addition the river Égrenne flows through the commune.

== See also ==
- Communes of the Orne department
