= Beauchêne, Orne =

Beauchêne
- Part of Tinchebray-Bocage
- Location of Beauchêne
- Location within France Location within Normandy
- Coordinates: 48°40′48″N 0°43′23″W
- Country: France
- Region: Normandy
- Department: Orne
- Arrondissement: Argentan
- Canton: Domfront
- Commune: Tinchebray-Bocage
- Area^{1}: 10.42 km^{2} (4.02 sq mi)
- Elevation: 228 m (748 ft)
- Highest elevation: 275 m (902 ft)
- Lowest elevation: 150 m (490 ft)
- Population (2023): 226
  - Density: 21.7/km^{2} (56.2/sq mi)
- Time zone: UTC+01:00 (CET)
  - Summer (DST): UTC+02:00 (CEST)
- Postal code: 61800
- ^{1} French Land Register data, which excludes lakes, ponds, glaciers > 1 km^{2} (0.386 sq mi or 247 acres) and river estuaries.

Beauchêne (French pronunciation: [boʃɛn]) is a former commune in the Orne department in the Normandy region in northwestern France. On 1 January 2015, Beauchêne and six other communes merged becoming one commune called Tinchebray-Bocage.

== See also ==
- Communes of the Orne department
