= Tinchebray =

Commune in Orne, France

- Part of Tinchebray-Bocage
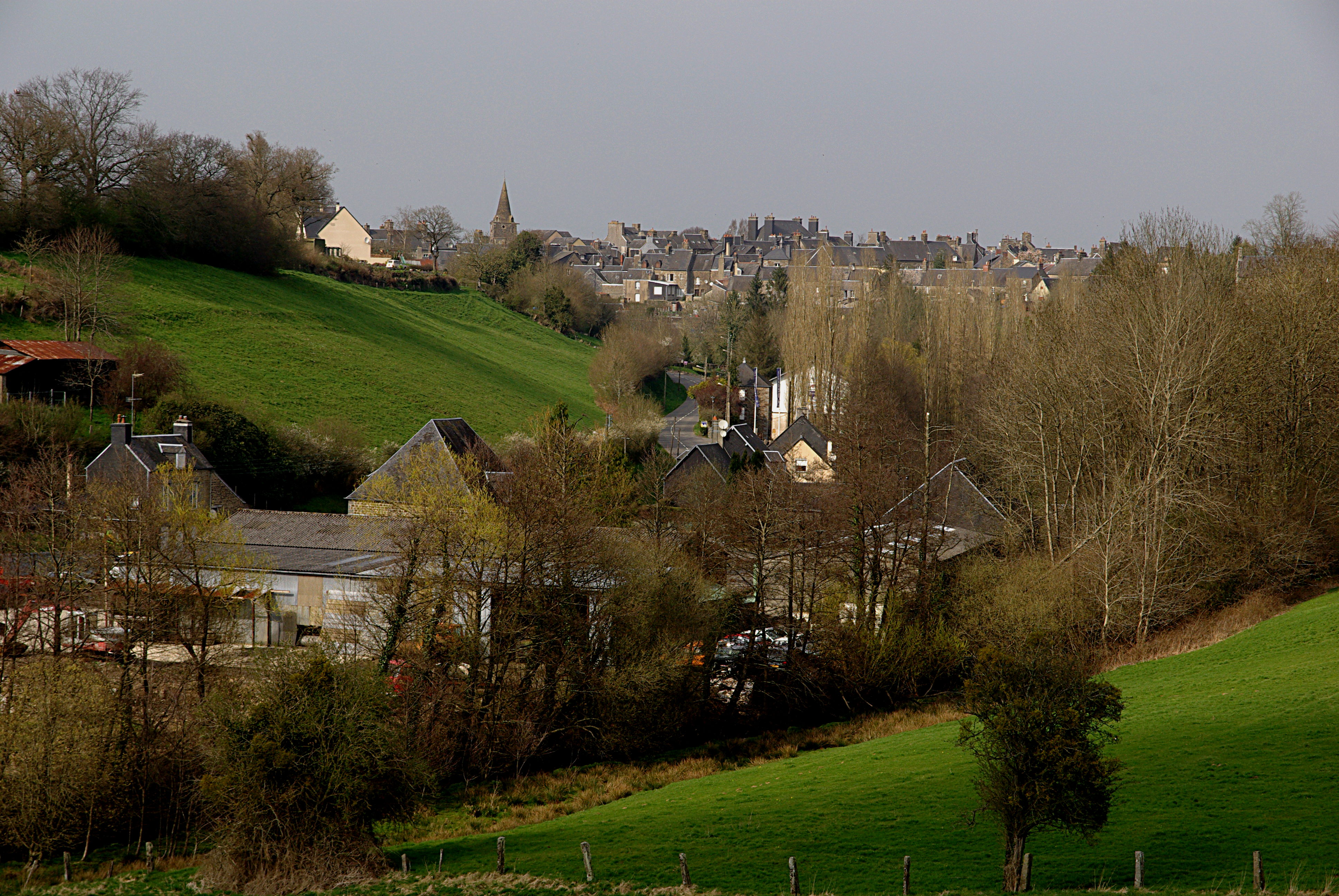
- Location of Tinchebray
- Location within France Location within Normandy
- Coordinates: 48°45′49″N 0°43′59″W
- Country: France
- Region: Normandy
- Department: Orne
- Arrondissement: Argentan
- Canton: Domfront
- Commune: Tinchebray-Bocage
- Area^{1}: 26.52 km^{2} (10.24 sq mi)
- Highest elevation: 311 m (1,020 ft)
- Lowest elevation: 152 m (499 ft)
- Population (2022): 2,549
  - Density: 96.12/km^{2} (248.9/sq mi)
- Demonym: Tinchebrayens
- Time zone: UTC+01:00 (CET)
  - Summer (DST): UTC+02:00 (CEST)
- Postal code: 61800
- Website: www.tinchebray.fr
- ^{1} French Land Register data, which excludes lakes, ponds, glaciers > 1 km^{2} (0.386 sq mi or 247 acres) and river estuaries.

Tinchebray (French pronunciation: [tɛ̃ʃ(ə)bʁɛ]) is a former commune in the Orne department in the Lower Normandy region in north-western France. On 1 January 2015, Tinchebray and six other communes merged becoming one commune called Tinchebray-Bocage.

== History ==
It was the scene of the Battle of Tinchebray fought on 28 September 1106.

During the Second World War, it was liberated by Allied forces on 15 August 1944.

== Heraldry ==
Arms of Tinchebray	The arms of Tinchebray are blazoned: Gules, a key between 2 pairs of shuttles each pair in saltire argent, on a chief Vert a lion passant between 2 fleurs de lys Or.

== See also ==
- Communes of the Orne department
