= Saint-Julien-en-Beauchêne =

- Commune
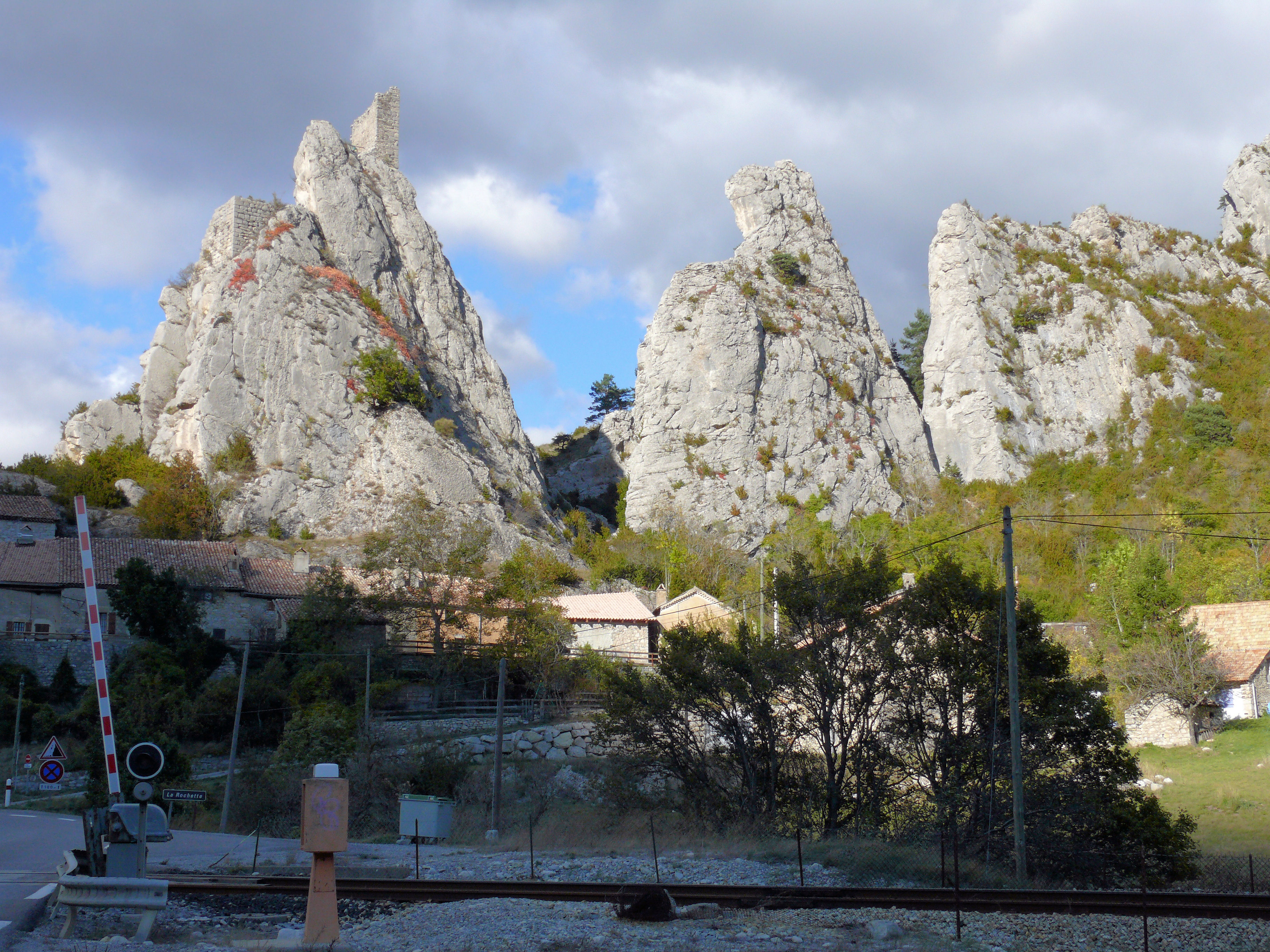
- The commune of Saint-Julien-en-Beauchêne, with the hamlet of La Rochette and the Alpine railway line
- Location of Saint-Julien-en-Beauchêne
- Location within France Location within Provence-Alpes-Côte d'Azur
- Coordinates: 44°37′01″N 5°42′37″E
- Country: France
- Region: Provence-Alpes-Côte d'Azur
- Department: Hautes-Alpes
- Arrondissement: Gap
- Canton: Serres

Government
  - Mayor (2026–32): Hélène Saletti
- Area^{1}: 59.43 km^{2} (22.95 sq mi)
- Elevation: 922 m (3,025 ft)
- Highest elevation: 2,365 m (7,759 ft)
- Lowest elevation: 847 m (2,779 ft)
- Population (2023): 140
  - Density: 2.4/km^{2} (6.1/sq mi)
- Time zone: UTC+01:00 (CET)
  - Summer (DST): UTC+02:00 (CEST)
- INSEE/Postal code: 05146 /05140
- ^{1} French Land Register data, which excludes lakes, ponds, glaciers > 1 km^{2} (0.386 sq mi or 247 acres) and river estuaries.

Saint-Julien-en-Beauchêne (French pronunciation: [sɛ̃ ʒyljɛ̃ ɑ̃ boʃɛn]; Vivaro-Alpine: Sant Julian de Buechaine) is a commune in the Hautes-Alpes department in southeastern France.

It is popular for skiing during the winter and for walks in the mountains during the summer.

== Population ==
Historical population
| Year | Pop. | ±% p.a. |
|---|---|---|
| 1968 | 139 | — |
| 1975 | 101 | −4.46% |
| 1982 | 114 | +1.74% |
| 1990 | 120 | +0.64% |
| 1999 | 108 | −1.16% |
| 2007 | 122 | +1.54% |
| 2012 | 126 | +0.65% |
| 2017 | 127 | +0.16% |
| 2023 | 140 | +1.64% |
Source: INSEE

== See also ==
- Communes of the Hautes-Alpes department
