= Maisoncelles-la-Jourdan =

- Part of Vire Normandie
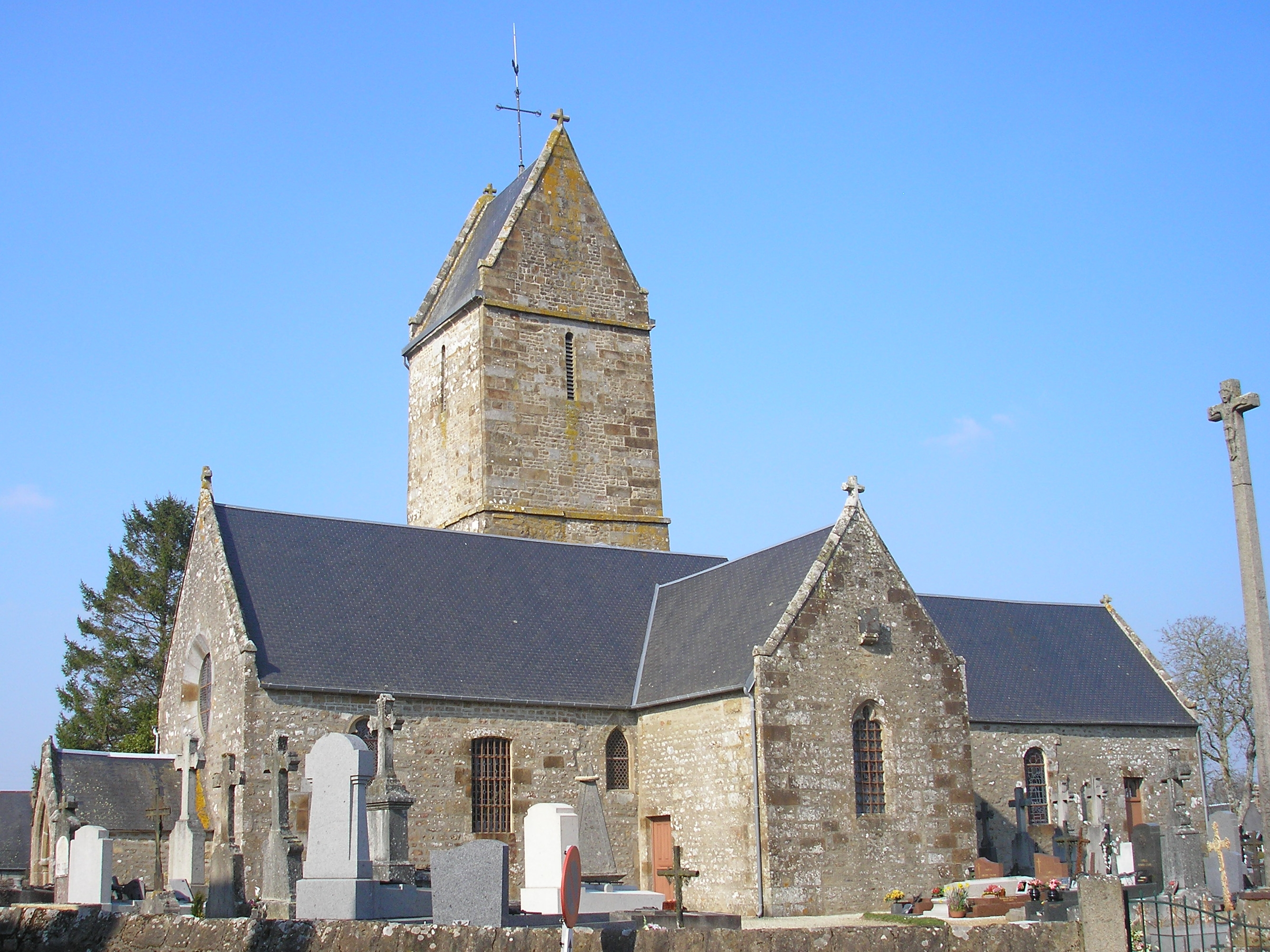
- Location of Maisoncelles-la-Jourdan
- Location within France Location within Normandy
- Coordinates: 48°48′05″N 0°50′54″W
- Country: France
- Region: Normandy
- Department: Calvados
- Arrondissement: Vire
- Canton: Vire Normandie
- Commune: Vire Normandie
- Area^{1}: 13.54 km^{2} (5.23 sq mi)
- Elevation: 230 m (750 ft)
- Highest elevation: 289 m (948 ft)
- Lowest elevation: 173 m (568 ft)
- Population (2023): 463
  - Density: 34.2/km^{2} (88.6/sq mi)
- Time zone: UTC+01:00 (CET)
  - Summer (DST): UTC+02:00 (CEST)
- Postal code: 14500
- ^{1} French Land Register data, which excludes lakes, ponds, glaciers > 1 km^{2} (0.386 sq mi or 247 acres) and river estuaries.

Maisoncelles-la-Jourdan (French pronunciation: [mɛzɔ̃sɛl la ʒuʁdɑ̃]) is a former commune in the Calvados department in the Normandy region in northwestern France. On 1 January 2016, it was merged into the new commune of Vire Normandie.

== See also ==
- Communes of the Calvados department
