= Chaulieu =

- Commune
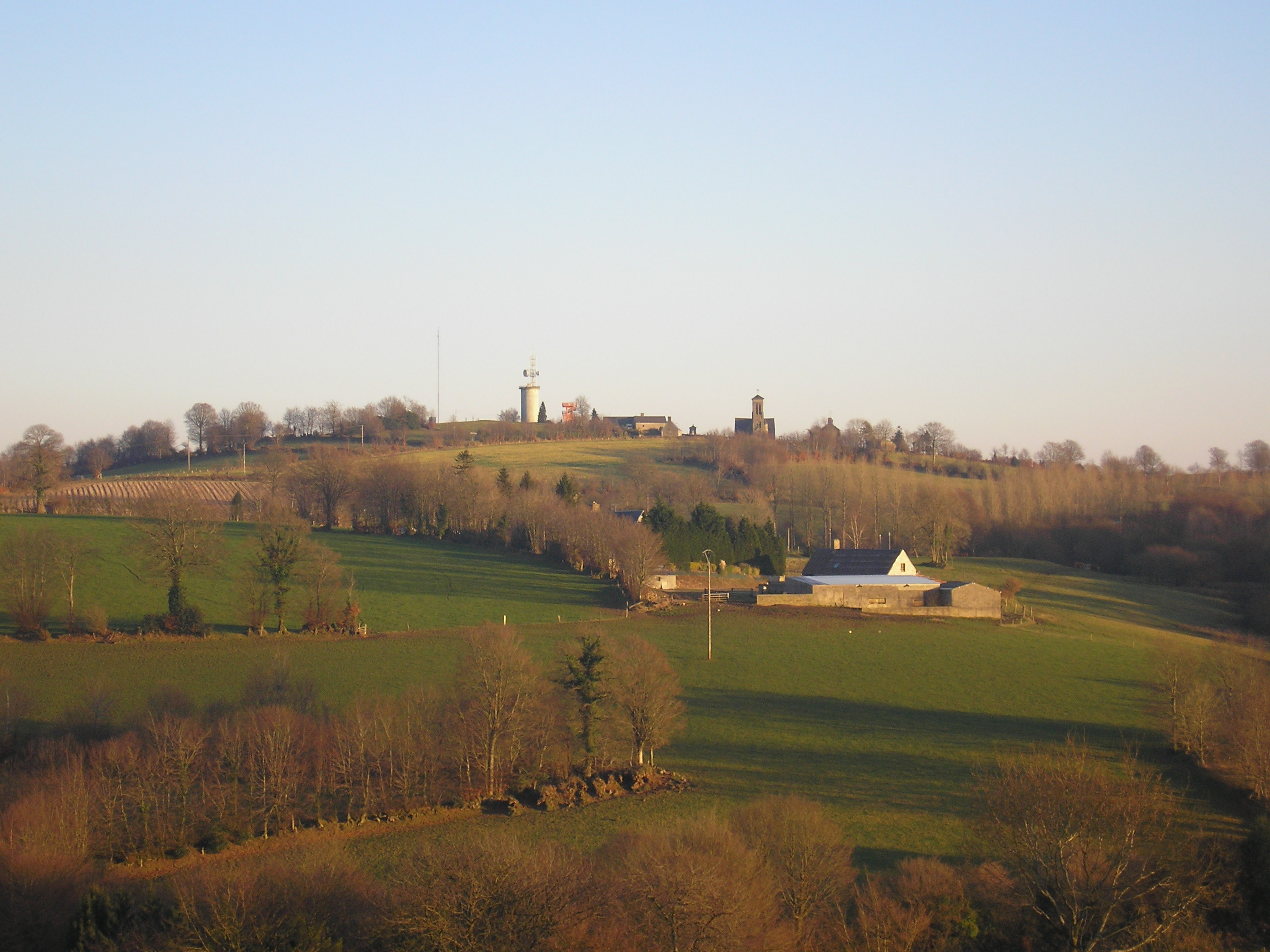
- The village of Saint-Martin, the highest point of Manche
- Location of Chaulieu
- Location within France Location within Normandy
- Coordinates: 48°44′10″N 0°51′38″W
- Country: France
- Region: Normandy
- Department: Manche
- Arrondissement: Avranches
- Canton: Le Mortainais
- Intercommunality: CA Mont-Saint-Michel-Normandie

Government
  - Mayor (2020–2026): Loïc Desdoits
- Area^{1}: 10.64 km^{2} (4.11 sq mi)
- Highest elevation: 366 m (1,201 ft)
- Lowest elevation: 243 m (797 ft)
- Population (2023): 274
  - Density: 25.8/km^{2} (66.7/sq mi)
- Time zone: UTC+01:00 (CET)
  - Summer (DST): UTC+02:00 (CEST)
- INSEE/Postal code: 50514 /50150
- ^{1} French Land Register data, which excludes lakes, ponds, glaciers > 1 km^{2} (0.386 sq mi or 247 acres) and river estuaries.

Chaulieu (French pronunciation: [ʃoljø]) is a commune in the Manche department in Normandy in north-western France. It was created in 1973 by the merger of two former communes: Saint-Martin-de-Chaulieu and Saint-Sauveur-de-Chaulieu.

== Geography ==
The commune is made up of the following collection of villages and hamlets, Saint-Sauveur de Chaulieu, Chaulieu, La Rue, L'Insinière and La Françaisière.

Chaulieu contains the source of the river Égrenne. In addition the river Vire flows through the commune.

== Points of Interest ==
- Belvédère de Chaulieu is a viewing tower built on the highest point, 368 m (1,207 ft 4 in), of the Manche department

=== National Heritage sites ===
- Château de Chaulieu - a seventeenth Century chateau, which was listed as a Monument historique in 1973.

== See also ==
- Communes of the Manche department
