= Canton of Domfront en Poiraie =

Coordinates: 48.59°N 0.65°W

The canton of Domfront en Poiraie (before March 2020: canton of Domfront) is an administrative division of the Orne department, northwestern France. Its borders were modified at the French canton reorganisation which came into effect in March 2015. Its seat is in Domfront en Poiraie.

It consists of the following communes:

1. Avrilly
2. Champsecret
3. Chanu
4. Domfront en Poiraie
5. Lonlay-l'Abbaye
6. Le Ménil-Ciboult
7. Montsecret-Clairefougère
8. Saint-Bômer-les-Forges
9. Saint-Brice
10. Saint-Christophe-de-Chaulieu
11. Saint-Gilles-des-Marais
12. Saint-Quentin-les-Chardonnets
13. Tinchebray-Bocage
