= Domfront en Poiraie =

Commune in Orne, France

- Commune
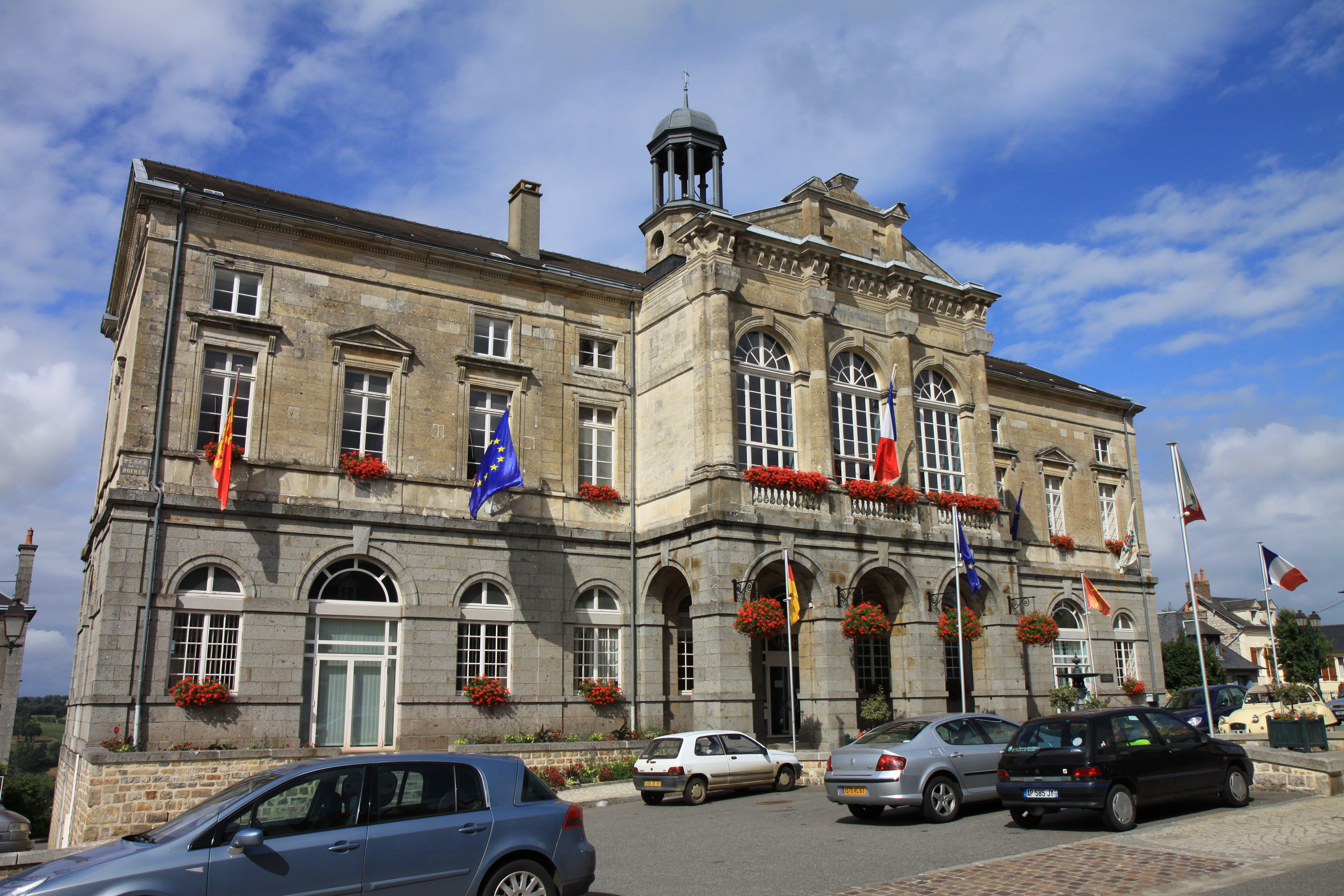
- The town hall of Domfront
- Location of Domfront en Poiraie
- Location within France Location within Normandy
- Coordinates: 48°35′38″N 0°39′00″W
- Country: France
- Region: Normandy
- Department: Orne
- Arrondissement: Argentan
- Canton: Domfront en Poiraie

Government
  - Mayor (2020–2026): Bernard Soul
- Area^{1}: 65.49 km^{2} (25.29 sq mi)
- Population (2023): 4,113
  - Density: 62.80/km^{2} (162.7/sq mi)
- Time zone: UTC+01:00 (CET)
  - Summer (DST): UTC+02:00 (CEST)
- INSEE/Postal code: 61145 /61700
- ^{1} French Land Register data, which excludes lakes, ponds, glaciers > 1 km^{2} (0.386 sq mi or 247 acres) and river estuaries.

Domfront en Poiraie (French pronunciation: [dɔ̃fʁɔ̃ ɑ̃ pwaʁɛ], literally Domfront in Pear Orchard) is a commune in the department of Orne, northwestern France. The municipality was established on 1 January 2016 by merger of the former communes of Domfront (the seat), La Haute-Chapelle and Rouellé. Its seat, Domfront, is classed as a Petites Cités de Caractère.

== Geography ==
The commune is made up of the following collection of villages and hamlets, Le Châtellier, Buais, La Guerdais, Rouellé, L'Hargrinière, La Pichellerie, La Croix Pavée, Saint-Front, Collière and Domfront.

It is 6,550 hectares (25.3 sq mi) in size. The highest point in the commune is 187 metres (614 ft).

The commune is within the Normandie-Maine Regional Natural Park. Domfront en Poiraie along with the communes of Perrou, Les Monts d'Andaine, Juvigny Val d'Andaine, Dompierre and Champsecret shares part of the Bassin de l'Andainette a Natura 2000 conservation site. The site measures 617 hectares and is home to creatures such as the Bullhead, Brook lamprey and white-clawed crayfish.

Domfront en Poiraie also shares another Natura 2000 protected area, Landes du Tertre Bizet et Fosse Arthour, which it shares with two other communes Lonlay-l'Abbaye and Saint-Georges-de-Rouelley.

The Andainette, The Varenne, The Égrenne and The Sonce are the four rivers, flowing through this commune. In addition a stream the Ruisseau de bavaux runs through the commune.

== Population ==
Population data refer to the area corresponding with the commune as of January 2025.

Historical population
Year	Pop.	±% p.a.
1968	4,936	—
1975	5,169	+0.66%
1982	5,291	+0.33%
1990	5,202	−0.21%
1999	5,085	−0.25%
2007	4,761	−0.82%
2012	4,571	−0.81%
2017	4,243	−1.48%
2023	4,113	−0.52%
Source: INSEE

== Points of interest ==
=== National heritage sites ===
The Commune has eight buildings and areas listed as a Monument historique.

- Château de Domfront are the remains of a castle which was first constructed in the 11th century, which was registered as a monument in 1875. The castle was the birthplace of Eleanor of England, Queen of Castile, daughter of Henry II, King of England, and Eleanor of Aquitaine.<
- Church of Notre-Dame-sur-l'Eau an eleventh century church, registered as a Monument historique in 1840.
- Saint-Julien Church a twentieth century church, decorated internally by Jean Gaudin, it was registered as a Monument historique in 1993.
- City walls of Domfront, the walls were first constructed in 1014 by William of Bellême, and later improved on by Robert II, Count of Artois who added 24 enclosure towers. Today there are 14 remaining towers. The walls were registered as a monument in 1929.
- Lyvonnières Manor a seventeenth century manor house, registered as a Monument historique in 2005.
- Manoir de la Guyardière a sixteenth century manor house, registered as a Monument historique in 1992.
- Manoir de la Palue a sixteenth century manor house, registered as a Monument historique in 2004.
- Sausserie Manor a fourteenth century fortified house, registered as a Monument historique in 1955.

== Sport ==
- Hippodrome de la Croix des Landes - Is a Race course that every has Harness racing in the last Sunday of every July.

== Notable people ==
- Eleanor of England, Queen of Castile - (c. 1161 – 1214), Queen of Castile and Toledo as wife of Alfonso VIII of Castile, was born here.
- Claude Duval - (1643 - 1670) a French highwayman in Restoration England, was born here.
- Émile Deshayes de Marcère - (1828 – 1918) a French politician, was born here.
- Auguste Chevalier - (1873 – 1956) a French botanist, taxonomist, and explorer of tropical Africa was born here, and later buried here at the Croix des Landes cemetery.
- Gabriel Bablon - (1905 - 1956) a French army officer and Compagnon de la Libération was born here.
- Chantal Jourdan - a member of the French National Assembly was born here.

== Twin towns – sister cities ==
Domfront en Poiraie is twinned with:

- Burgwedel, Germany
- Seia, Portugal

== See also ==
- Communes of the Orne department
