= Champsecret =

- Commune
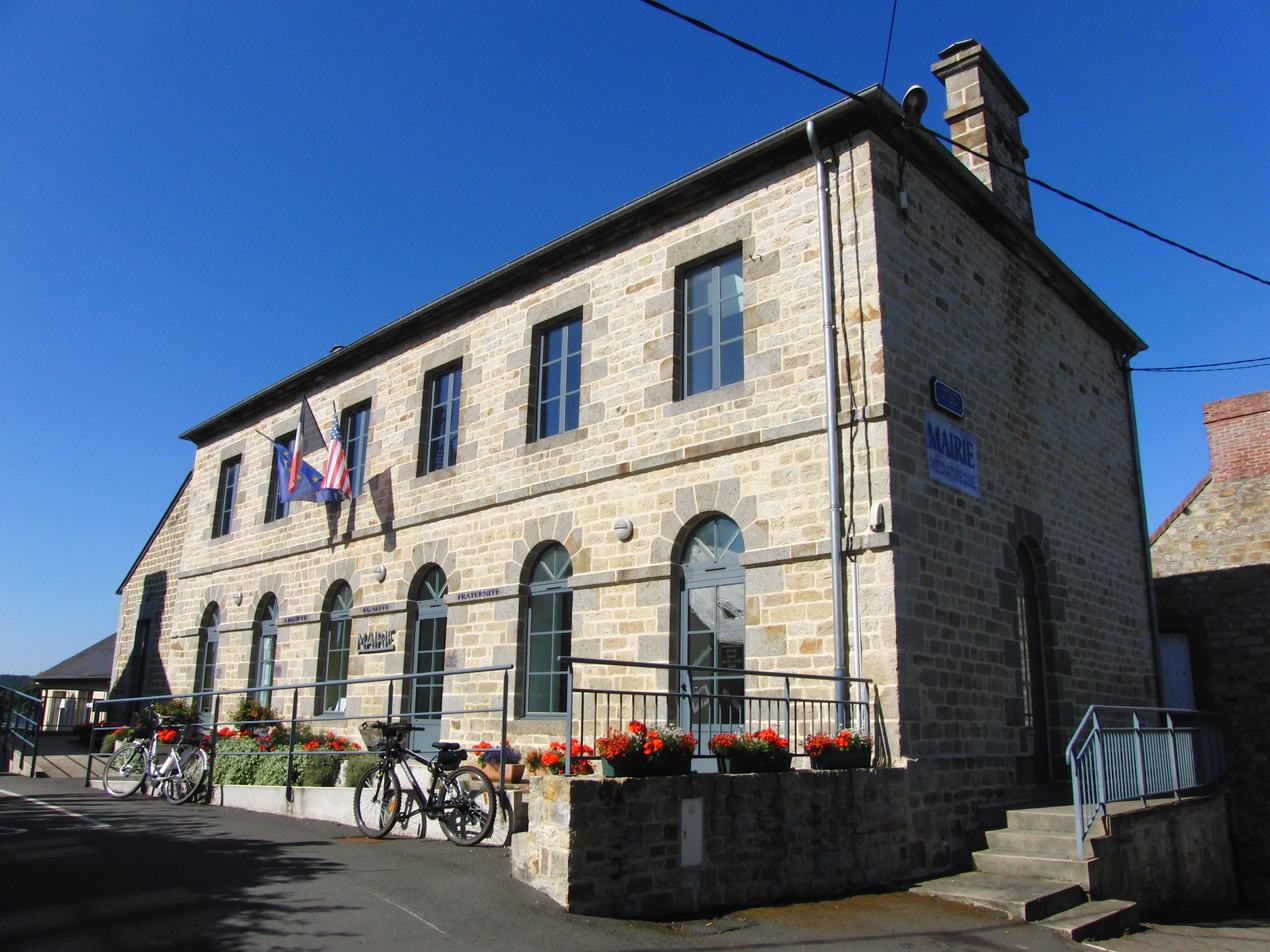
- The town hall in Champsecret
- Location of Champsecret
- Location within France Location within Normandy
- Coordinates: 48°36′36″N 0°32′58″W
- Country: France
- Region: Normandy
- Department: Orne
- Arrondissement: Argentan
- Canton: Domfront en Poiraie
- Intercommunality: Domfront Tinchebray Interco

Government
  - Mayor (2020–2026): Julien Corbière
- Area^{1}: 44.68 km^{2} (17.25 sq mi)
- Elevation: 300 m (980 ft)
- Highest elevation: 313 m (1,027 ft)
- Lowest elevation: 140 m (460 ft)
- Population (2023): 963
  - Density: 21.6/km^{2} (55.8/sq mi)
- Time zone: UTC+01:00 (CET)
  - Summer (DST): UTC+02:00 (CEST)
- INSEE/Postal code: 61091 /61700
- ^{1} French Land Register data, which excludes lakes, ponds, glaciers > 1 km^{2} (0.386 sq mi or 247 acres) and river estuaries.

Champsecret (French pronunciation: [ʃɑ̃səkʁɛ]) is a commune in the Orne department in north-western France.

== Geography ==
The commune is made up of the following collection of villages and hamlets, La Chesnaie, Les Fourchets, La Botellerie, Le Hamel, Le Tertre, Pont de Pierre, La Noé, La Basse Verrerie, L'Ermitage and Champsecret.

It is 4,470 hectares (17.3 sq mi) in size. The highest point in the commune is 215 metres (705 ft).

The commune is within the Normandie-Maine Regional Natural Park. Champsecret along with the communes of Perrou, Les Monts d'Andaine, Juvigny Val d'Andaine, Dompierre and Domfront en Poiraie is part of the Bassin de l'Andainette a Natura 2000 conservation site. The site measures 617 hectares and is home to creatures such as the Bullhead, Brook lamprey and white-clawed crayfish.

The Andainette and the Varenne are the two rivers, running through this commune.

== Points of interest ==
- Arboretum de l'Étoile des Andaines - Created in 1947 this arboretum features over 70 hardwood and Conifer trees.

=== National heritage sites ===
The Commune has four buildings and areas listed as a Monument historique.

- Forges de Varennes the site features a blast furnace built in 1767, a refinery and a splitting mill, it was registered as a monument in 1987.
- Champsecret Church a seventeenth century church, registered as a Monument historique in 1984.
- Cross of the old cemetery a sixteenth century hexagonal granite cross, registered as a Monument historique in 1938.
- Old manor a fourteenth century manor, registered as a Monument historique in 1926.

== Notable people ==
- Auguste-François Maunoury - (1811–1898) was a Catholic Hellenist and exegete, who was born here.
- Louis Corbière - (1850 - 1941) a French botanist and mycologist was born here.
- Charles Lucien Léandre - (1862–1934) was a French caricaturist and painter, who was born here, and later buried here.
- Chantal Jourdan - (born 1952) a member of the French National Assembly, was mayor here from 2008-2014.

== See also ==
- Communes of the Orne department
- Parc naturel régional Normandie-Maine
