= Bassin de l'Andainette =

Bassin de l'Andainette (French pronunciation: [basɛ̃ də lɑ̃dɛnɛt]) translated as the Andainette basin is a Natura 2000 conservation area that is 1,024 hectares in size.

== Geography ==
The area follows the Andainette, which is a tributary of the Varenne, which in turn flows into the Mayenne river. The east of the area is woodland, while the west is Bocage.

It is spread across 6 different communes all within three departments the Orne, Sarthe and Mayenne;

1. Champsecret
2. Domfront en Poiraie
3. Dompierre
4. Juvigny Val d'Andaine
5. Les Monts d'Andaine
6. Perrou

This protected site is within the Normandie-Maine Regional Natural Park.

== Conservation ==
The conservation area has four species listed in Annex 2 of the Habitats Directive;

1. European bullhead
2. Cottus perifretum
3. Brook lamprey
4. White-clawed crayfish

In addition the Natura 2000 site has eight habitats protected under the Habitats Directive.
