= Les Monts d'Andaine =

- Commune
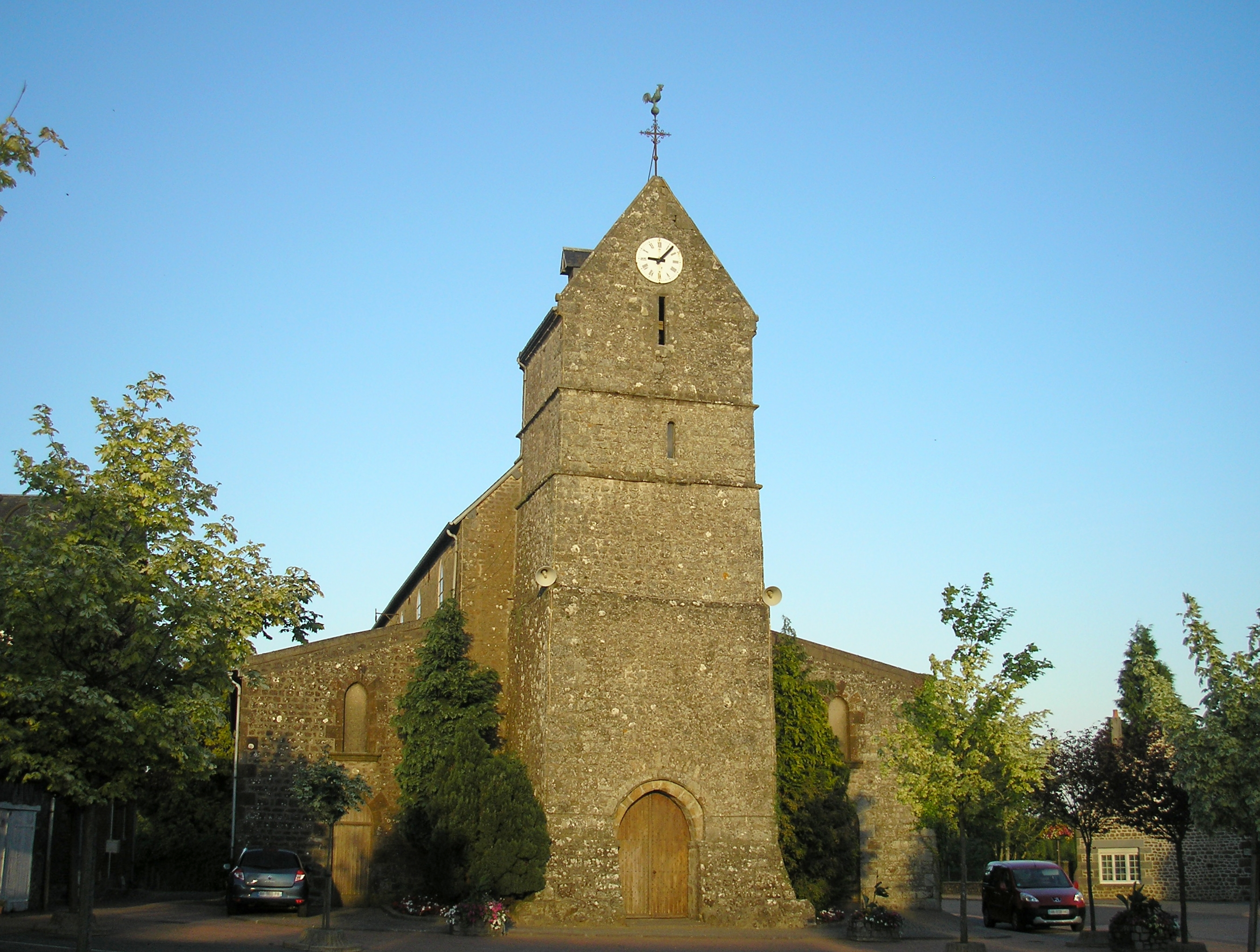
- The church in La Sauvagère
- Location of Les Monts d'Andaine
- Location within France Location within Normandy
- Coordinates: 48°37′26″N 0°24′58″W
- Country: France
- Region: Normandy
- Department: Orne
- Arrondissement: Argentan
- Canton: La Ferté-Macé
- Intercommunality: CA Flers Agglo

Government
  - Mayor (2020–2026): Stéphan Gravelat
- Area^{1}: 38.08 km^{2} (14.70 sq mi)
- Population (2023): 1,684
  - Density: 44.22/km^{2} (114.5/sq mi)
- Time zone: UTC+01:00 (CET)
  - Summer (DST): UTC+02:00 (CEST)
- INSEE/Postal code: 61463 /61600
- ^{1} French Land Register data, which excludes lakes, ponds, glaciers > 1 km^{2} (0.386 sq mi or 247 acres) and river estuaries.

Les Monts d'Andaine (French pronunciation: [le mɔ̃ dɑ̃dɛn]) is a commune in the department of Orne, northwestern France. The municipality was established on 1 January 2016 by merger of the former communes of Saint-Maurice-du-Désert and La Sauvagère (the seat).

== Geography ==
The commune is made up of the following collection of villages and hamlets, La Serrière, L'Hermangère, Le Domaine, Le Mont Oiselet, La Bêlère, Les Landes and Les Monts-d'Andaine.

It is 3,810 hectares (14.7 sq mi) in size. The highest point in the commune is 256 metres (840 ft).

The commune is within the Normandie-Maine Regional Natural Park. Les Monts d'Andaine along with the communes of Perrou, Juvigny Val d'Andaine, Domfront en Poiraie, Dompierre and Champsecret shares part of the Bassin de l'Andainette a Natura 2000 conservation site. The site measures 617 hectares and is home to creatures such as the Bullhead, Brook lamprey and white-clawed crayfish.

The commune has five watercourses flowing through its borders, la Vee river, The Andainette river, the Rouvrette river, la Petitiere stream and The Laurenciere stream.

== Notable buildings and places ==
=== National heritage sites ===
The Commune has two buildings and areas listed as a Monument historique.

- Allée couverte de la Bertinière is a Neolithic covered walkway, listed as a monument in 1967.
- Monts d’Andaine Manor is a 17th-century manor house listed as a monument in 1981.

== Notable people ==
- Jean-Pierre Brisset (1837–1919) a French outsider writer, was born in La Sauvagère.
- Catherine Coutelle (born 1945) was a member of the National Assembly of France and was born in La Sauvagère.
- Maurice de Germiny (born 1939) was the bishop of Blois from 1997 to 2014 and was born in Saint-Maurice-du-Désert.

== See also ==
- Communes of the Orne department
