= Dompierre, Orne =

Dompierre
- Commune
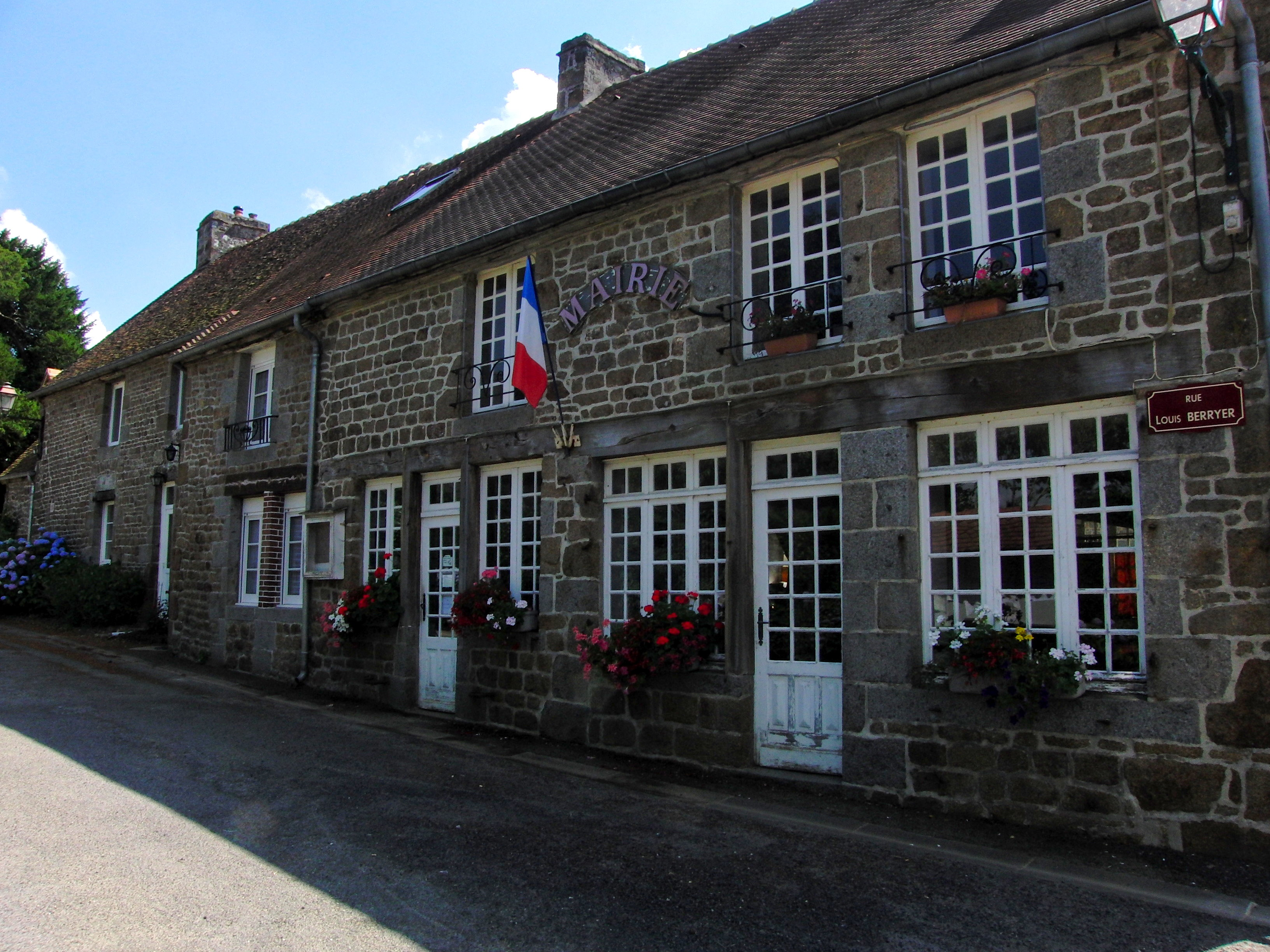
- The town hall in Dompierre
- Location of Dompierre
- Location within France Location within Normandy
- Coordinates: 48°37′59″N 0°33′03″W
- Country: France
- Region: Normandy
- Department: Orne
- Arrondissement: Argentan
- Canton: La Ferté-Macé
- Intercommunality: CA Flers Agglo

Government
  - Mayor (2020–2026): Daniel Bigeon
- Area^{1}: 8.56 km^{2} (3.31 sq mi)
- Elevation: 220 m (720 ft)
- Highest elevation: 257 m (843 ft)
- Lowest elevation: 172 m (564 ft)
- Population (2023): 380
  - Density: 44/km^{2} (110/sq mi)
- Time zone: UTC+01:00 (CET)
  - Summer (DST): UTC+02:00 (CEST)
- INSEE/Postal code: 61146 /61700
- ^{1} French Land Register data, which excludes lakes, ponds, glaciers > 1 km^{2} (0.386 sq mi or 247 acres) and river estuaries.

Dompierre (French pronunciation: [dɔ̃pjɛʁ]) is a commune in the Orne department in north-western France.

== Geography ==
The commune is made up of the following collection of villages and hamlets, Le Château, Le Chemin, Plessis and Dompierre.

It is 860 hectares (3.3 sq mi) in size. The highest point in the commune is 225 metres (738 ft).

The commune is within the Normandie-Maine Regional Natural Park. Dompierre along with the communes of Perrou, Les Monts d'Andaine, Juvigny Val d'Andaine, Domfront en Poiraie and Champsecret shares part of the Bassin de l'Andainette a Natura 2000 conservation site. The site measures 617 hectares and is home to creatures such as the Bullhead, Brook lamprey and white-clawed crayfish.

The Varenne river is the only watercourse running through this commune.

== Notable buildings and places ==
The Iron House is a museum about the history of the forges and iron mines of Bocage Ornais.

== Notable people ==
- Sébastien de Brossard (1655-1730), a music theorist, composer and collector, was born here.

== See also ==
- Communes of the Orne department
- Parc naturel régional Normandie-Maine
