= Forgas =

Forgas or Forgàs may refer to:

- Ernest Forgàs (born 1993), Spanish footballer
- Josep Forgas, Spanish footballer (played 1920s–1940s)
- Joseph Paul Forgas (born 1947), Australian social psychologist
- Yaniela Forgas Moreno (born 1992), Cuban chess grandmaster
- Patrick Forgas, founder of the French band Forgas Band Phenomena
- Forgas, old name for the River Fergus in Ireland

== See also ==
- Forges (disambiguation)
