= Deniaud =

Deniaud is a French surname. Notable people with the surname include:

- Dominique Deniaud (born 1977), French ice dancer
- Thomas Deniaud (born 1971), French footballer
- Yves Deniaud (disambiguation), multiple people
