= Sacha Houlié =

French politician (born 1988)

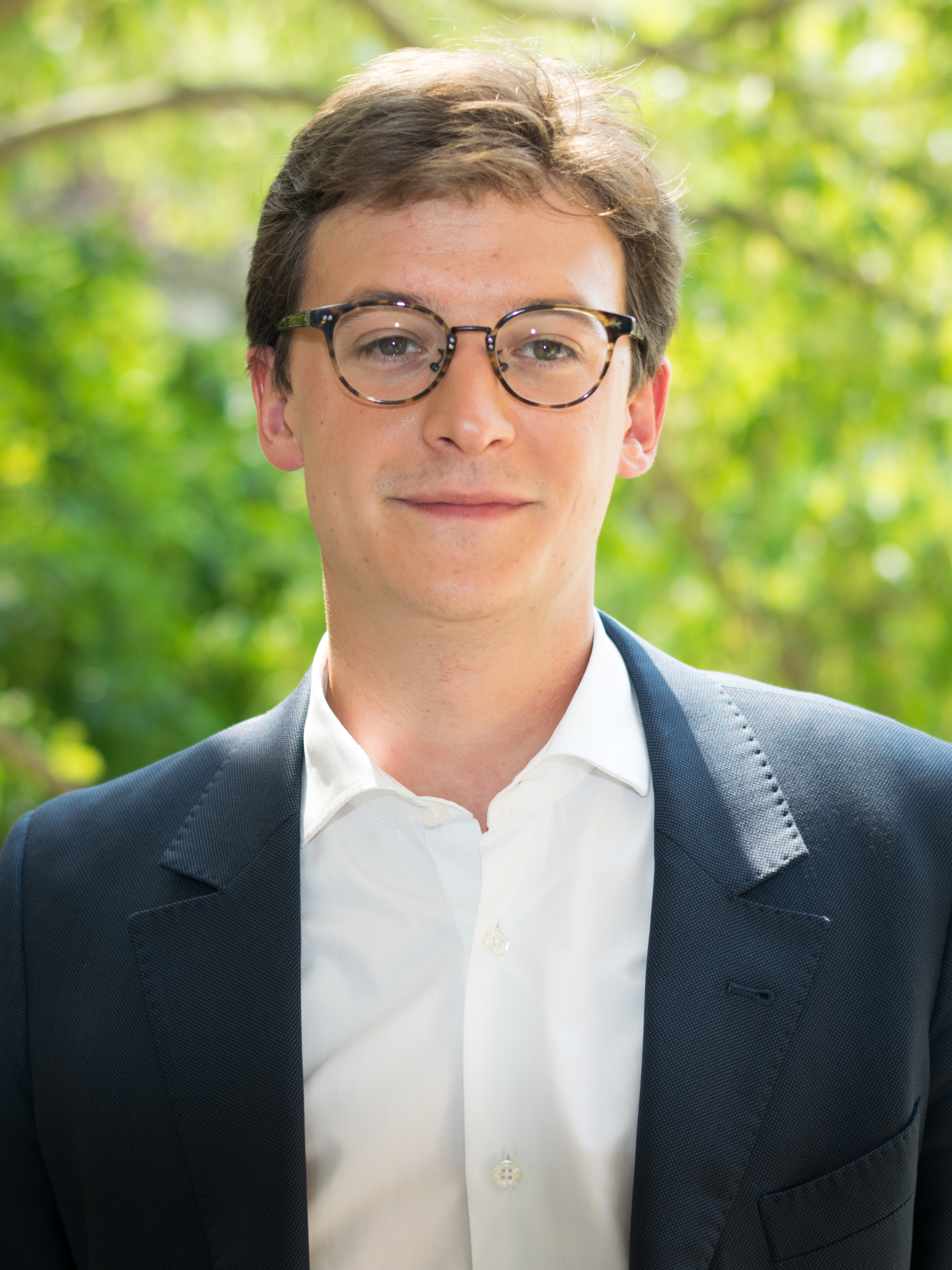

Member of the National Assembly for Vienne's 2nd constituency
- Incumbent
- Assumed office 21 June 2017
- Preceded by: Catherine Coutelle

Personal details
- Born: 8 October 1988 (age 38) Bressuire, France
- Party: Place Publique (2025–Present)
- Other political affiliations: Socialist Party (2007–2016); Renaissance (2016–2024)
- Education: University of Poitiers; Paris 2 Panthéon-Assas University
- Profession: Lawyer

Sacha Houlié (born 8 October 1988) is a French lawyer and politician of former member La République En Marche! (LREM 2017–2024) who has been serving as a member of the French National Assembly since the 2017 elections, representing the department of Vienne.

== Political career ==
=== Early beginnings ===
Having previously been active for the Socialist Party, Houlié joined LREM in 2015. Together with three friends, including Pierre Person, he founded "Jeunes avec Macron" (Young People for Macron) in June 2015.

=== Member of the National Assembly, 2017–present ===
In parliament, Houlié has been serving as member of the Committee on Legal Affairs since 2017. In this capacity, he was his parliamentary group's rapporteur on 2019 legislation to strengthen the powers of elected municipal officials, particularly in small municipalities. From 2017 until 2018, he was also one of the National Assembly's six vice-presidents, under the leadership of president François de Rugy. Within his parliamentary group, he is considered a close ally of President Emmanuel Macron.

Following Pierre Person's resignation from the LREM leadership in September 2020, Houlié joined him and stepped down as well.

In 2022, Houlié was elected chair of the Committee on Legal Affairs.

== Other activities ==
- École nationale d'administration (ENA), Member of the Board of Directors

== Political positions ==
Houlié is considered an advocate of an open and "inclusive" secularism. In early 2018, he was one of several LREM member who joined an informal parliamentary working group on Islam set up by Florent Boudié in order to contribute to the government's bill aimed at better organising and supervising the financing of the Muslim faith in France.

In May 2018, Houlié co-sponsored an initiative in favour of legalizing assisted reproductive technology (ART) for all women (singles, heterosexual couples or lesbian couples).

Amid efforts to contain the COVID-19 pandemic in France, Houlié opposed the government's proposal for a state-supported “StopCovid” contact-tracing app project, arguing it could amount to "undemocratic state surveillance." Also in 2020, he went against his parliamentary group's majority and abstained from an important vote on a much discussed security bill drafted by his colleagues Alice Thourot and Jean-Michel Fauvergue that helps, among other measures, curtail the filming of police forces.

== Controversy ==
In mid-2019, French farmers vandalized Houlié's office in Poitiers, in an effort to protest against his support for the Comprehensive Economic and Trade Agreement (CETA) between Canada and the European Union. In April 2021, the inscription "Death to pigs" was found written on the building's facade. In August 2021, the office was set on fire.

== See also ==
- 2017 French legislative election

== Bibliography ==
- "Sacha Houlié, ce député en pétard qui veut que ça roule" in Hallier tout feu tout flamme, Jean-Pierre Thiollet, Neva Editions, 2023. ISBN 978-2-35055-309-2
