= Saint-Bômer-les-Forges =

- Commune
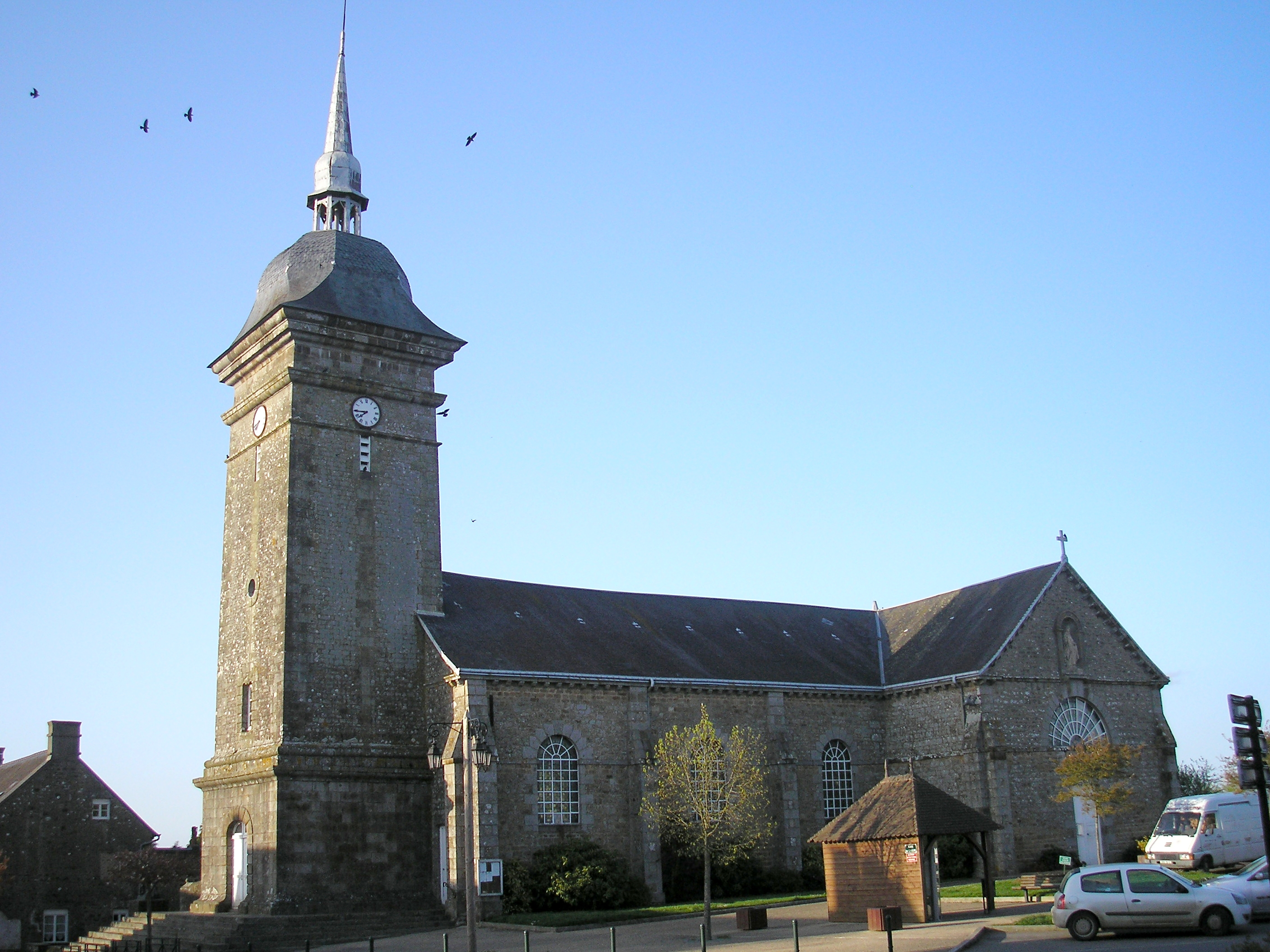
- The church in Saint-Bômer-les-Forges
- Location of Saint-Bômer-les-Forges
- Location within France Location within Normandy
- Coordinates: 48°38′40″N 0°37′55″W
- Country: France
- Region: Normandy
- Department: Orne
- Arrondissement: Argentan
- Canton: Domfront en Poiraie

Government
  - Mayor (2020–2026): Didier Lerallu
- Area^{1}: 31.08 km^{2} (12.00 sq mi)
- Elevation: 225 m (738 ft)
- Highest elevation: 271 m (889 ft)
- Lowest elevation: 137 m (449 ft)
- Population (2023): 1,023
  - Density: 32.92/km^{2} (85.25/sq mi)
- Time zone: UTC+01:00 (CET)
  - Summer (DST): UTC+02:00 (CEST)
- INSEE/Postal code: 61369 /61700
- ^{1} French Land Register data, which excludes lakes, ponds, glaciers > 1 km^{2} (0.386 sq mi or 247 acres) and river estuaries.

Saint-Bômer-les-Forges (French pronunciation: [sɛ̃ bomɛʁ le fɔʁʒ]) is a commune in the Orne department in north-western France.

== Geography ==
The commune is made up of the following collection of villages and hamlets, Le Four à Chaux, Platier, La Guimardière, Le Grand Mesnil, Les Forges, La Maigraire and Saint-Bômer-les-Forges.

It is 3,110 hectares (12.0 sq mi) in size. The highest point in the commune is 239 metres (784 ft).

The commune is within the Normandie-Maine Regional Natural Park.

The Andainette, the Varenne and the Halouze are the three rivers, running through this commune.

== Points of interest ==
=== National heritage sites ===
The Commune has two buildings and areas listed as a Monument historique.

- Megalithic ensemble Neolithic megalithic which was registered as a monument in 1975.
- Manoir de la Bérardière a sixteenth century Manor house, registered as a Monument historique in 1974.

== Notable people ==
- Henri François Anne de Roussel (1748 - 1812) a French naturalist, was born here.

== See also ==
- Communes of the Orne department
