= Jean-Pierre Brisset =

French writer (1837 - 1919)

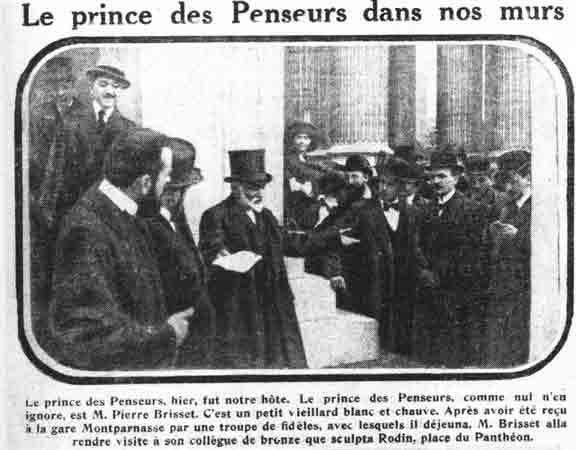
- The Prince of Thinkers welcomed and applauded in Paris (1909).
- Born: 30 October 1837; La Sauvagère
- Died: 2 September 1919 (aged 81); La Ferté Macé
- Resting place: La Ferté Macé
- Other names: The Prince of Thinkers
- Citizenship: French
- Occupation: writer

Jean-Pierre Brisset (30 October 1837 – 2 September 1919) was a French outsider writer.

== Biography ==
Born into a farming family of La Sauvagère, Brisset was an autodidact. Having left school at age twelve to help on the family farm, he apprenticed as a pastry chef in Paris three years later. In 1855, he enlisted in the army for seven years and fought in the Crimean War. In 1859, during the war in Italy against Austria, he was wounded at the Battle of Magenta and taken prisoner. During the Franco-Prussian War, he was a second lieutenant in the 50^{e} régiment d'infanterie de ligne. Taken prisoner again, he was sent to Magdeburg in Saxony, where he learned German.

In 1871, he published La natation ou l'art de nager appris seul en moins d'une heure (Learning the art of swimming alone in less than an hour), then resigned from the Army and moved to Marseille. Here he filed a patent for the "airlift swimming trunks and belt with a double compensatory reservoir". This commercial endeavor was a complete failure. He returned to Magdeburg, where he earned his living as a language teacher, developing a method for learning French, which he self-published in 1874.

Brisset became stationmaster at the railway station of Angers, and later of L'Aigle. After publishing another book on the French language, he undertook his major philosophical work, which contended that humans were descended from frogs. Brisset supported his contention by comparing the French and frog languages – deriving, for example, "logement" (dwelling) from "l'eau" (water). He was serious about his "morosophy", and authored a number of books and pamphlets putting forth his case, which he had printed and distributed at his own expense.

In 1912, novelist Jules Romains, who had obtained copies of God's Mystery and The Human Origins, set up, with the help of fellow hoaxers, a rigged election for a "Prince of Thinkers". Unsurprisingly, Brisset got elected. The Election Committee then called Brisset to Paris in 1913, where he was received and acclaimed with great pomp. He partook in several ceremonies and a banquet and uttered emotional words of thanks for this unexpected late recognition of his work. Newspapers exposed the hoax the next day.

In 1919, Brisset died, aged 81, at La Ferté-Macé.

== Posthumous reputation ==
The Complete Works of Brisset were reprinted by Marc Décimo, Dijon, Les Presses du réel, 2001. In an essay entitled, Jean-Pierre Brisset, Prince des Penseurs, inventeur, grammairien et prophète, Dijon, Les presses du réel, 2001, Marc Décimo provided a biography and explanations for Brisset's obsession with frogs as ancestors of humankind. Translations into several languages (including Wolof, Armenian, Arabic and Houma) can be found in this book as well. It also includes the major texts written about Brisset by Jules Romains, Marcel Duchamp, André Breton, Raymond Queneau and Michel Foucault. In 2004 the Art of Swimming (as a frog) was published in paperback.

Around 2001, Ernestine Chassebœuf wrote several letters to French politicians, universities, railway stations, library directors, psychiatric hospitals, to suggest they name a street or a university after Brisset. Their answers were published on a website dedicated to him, but there is as of yet no "rue Jean-Pierre Brisset". Thanks to a bequest by Jules Romain, an annual dinner in his memory was made possible until 1939.

Brisset is listed as a saint on the 'Pataphysics calendar. His writings were in print as of 2004.

== Works ==
- Œuvres complètes, Les Presses du réel, collection L'écart absolu, Dijon, 2001 et 2^{e} éd. 2004.
- Œuvres natatoires, Les Presses du réel, collection L'écart absolu - poche, Dijon, 2001.
- La Grande nouvelle, Édition en fac similé du Cymbalum Pataphysicum.
