= Juvigny Val d'Andaine =

- Commune
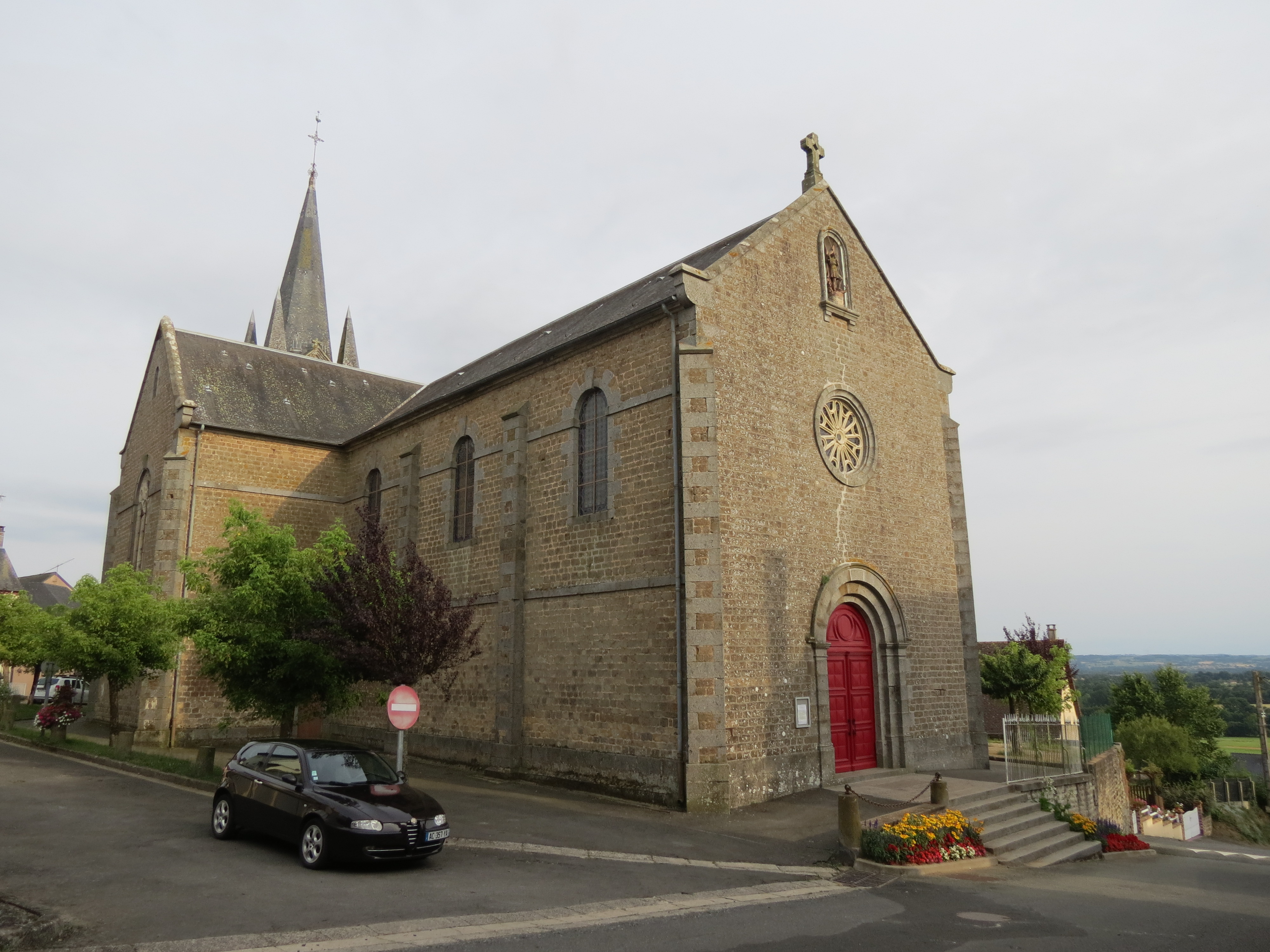
- The church in Juvigny-sous-Andaine
- Location of Juvigny Val d'Andaine
- Location within France Location within Normandy
- Coordinates: 48°33′07″N 0°30′29″W
- Country: France
- Region: Normandy
- Department: Orne
- Arrondissement: Alençon
- Canton: Bagnoles de l'Orne Normandie

Government
  - Mayor (2022–2026): Henri Leroux
- Area^{1}: 79.62 km^{2} (30.74 sq mi)
- Population (2023): 2,094
  - Density: 26.30/km^{2} (68.12/sq mi)
- Time zone: UTC+01:00 (CET)
  - Summer (DST): UTC+02:00 (CEST)
- INSEE/Postal code: 61211 /61140, 61330
- ^{1} French Land Register data, which excludes lakes, ponds, glaciers > 1 km^{2} (0.386 sq mi or 247 acres) and river estuaries.

Juvigny Val d'Andaine (French pronunciation: [ʒyviɲi val dɑ̃dɛn]) is a commune in the department of Orne, northwestern France. The municipality was established on 1 January 2016 by merger of the former communes of La Baroche-sous-Lucé, Beaulandais, Juvigny-sous-Andaine (the seat), Loré, Lucé, Saint-Denis-de-Villenette and Sept-Forges.

== Geography ==
The commune is made up of the following collection of villages and hamlets, Lucé, Le Bois Jousselin, Le Jardin, La Baroche-sous-Lucé, Beaulandais, Saint-Denis-de-Villenette, La Vallée and Juvigny-Val-d'Andaine.

It is 7,960 hectares (30.7 sq mi) in size. The highest point in the commune is 190 metres (620 ft).

The commune is within the Normandie-Maine Regional Natural Park. Juvigny Val d'Andaine along with the communes of Perrou, Les Monts d'Andaine, Domfront en Poiraie, Dompierre and Champsecret shares part of the Bassin de l'Andainette a Natura 2000 conservation site. The site measures 617 hectares and is home to creatures such as the Bullhead, Brook lamprey and white-clawed crayfish.

The commune has the river Mayenne traversing its borders.

== Population ==
Population data refer to the area corresponding with the commune as of January 2025.

Historical population
Year	Pop.	±% p.a.
1968	2,725	—
1975	2,568	−0.84%
1982	2,422	−0.83%
1990	2,411	−0.06%
1999	2,300	−0.52%
2007	2,280	−0.11%
2012	2,221	−0.52%
2017	2,193	−0.25%
2023	2,094	−0.77%
Source: INSEE

== Points of interest ==
- Michaudière Farm is a farm open to the public dedicated to showing and looking after draught horses.

=== National heritage sites ===
The Commune has five buildings and areas listed as a Monument historique.

- Bonvouloir castle remains of a fifteenth century castle and estate that was registered as a monument in 1995.
- Etrigé Chapel a twelfth century chapel, registered as a Monument historique in 1997.
- Mebzon Manor a fourteenth century Manor house, registered as a Monument historique in 1998.
- Saint-Aignan Church a sixteenth century church, registered as a Monument historique in 1928.
- Cross of the old cemetery a sixteenth century cross in Beaulandais, registered as a Monument historique in 1938.

== See also ==
- Communes of the Orne department
