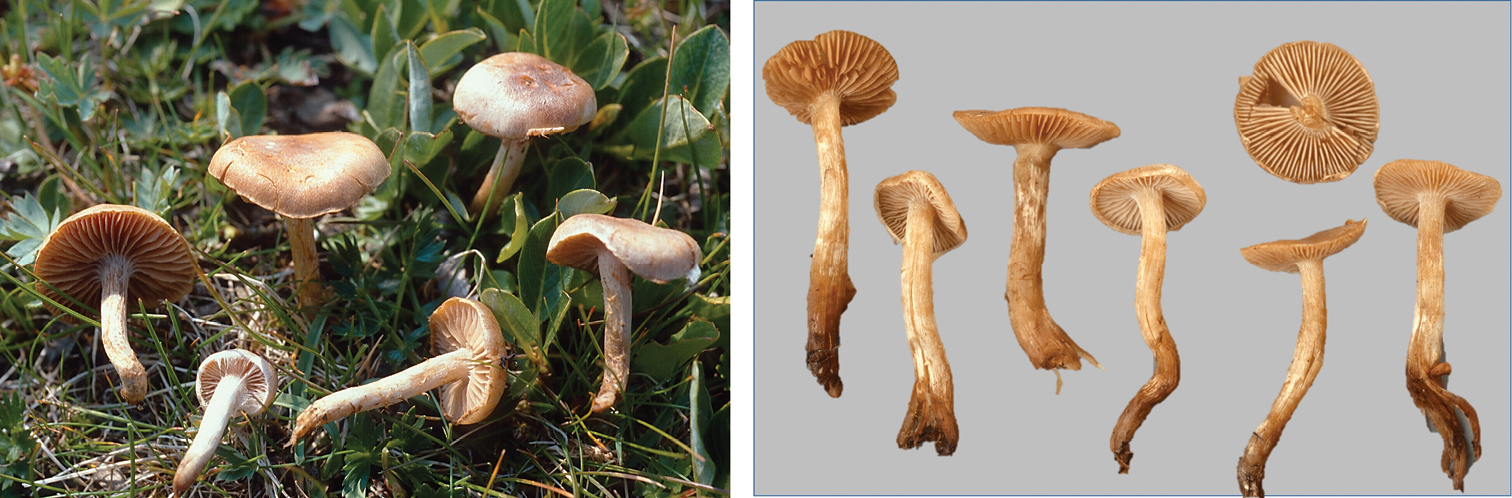

Scientific classification
- Domain: Eukaryota
- Kingdom: Fungi
- Division: Basidiomycota
- Class: Agaricomycetes
- Order: Agaricales
- Family: Hymenogastraceae
- Genus: Hebeloma
- Species: H. dunense

Binomial name
- Hebeloma dunense L.Corb. & R.Heim (1929)

Synonyms
- Hebelomatis dunense (L.Corb. & R.Heim) Locq. (1979)

= Hebeloma dunense =

Species of fungus

Hebeloma dunense is a species of agaric fungus in the family Hymenogastraceae.
