= Perrou =

- Commune
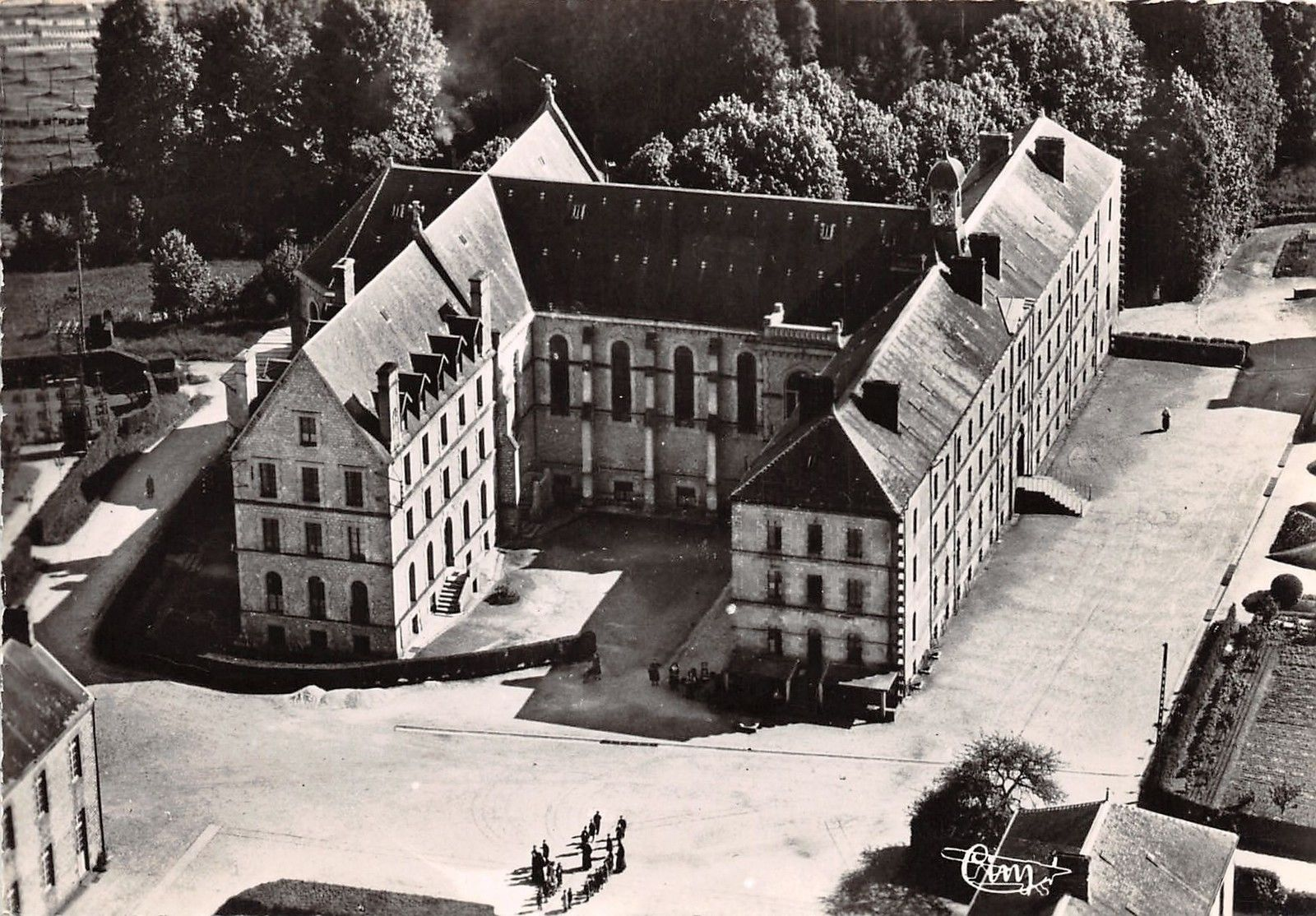
- Location of Perrou
- Location within France Location within Normandy
- Coordinates: 48°34′27″N 0°33′21″W
- Country: France
- Region: Normandy
- Department: Orne
- Arrondissement: Alençon
- Canton: Bagnoles de l'Orne Normandie
- Intercommunality: Andaine-Passais

Government
  - Mayor (2020–2026): Jeannine Rablineau
- Area^{1}: 4.34 km^{2} (1.68 sq mi)
- Elevation: 208 m (682 ft)
- Highest elevation: 274 m (899 ft)
- Lowest elevation: 170 m (560 ft)
- Population (2023): 299
  - Density: 68.9/km^{2} (178/sq mi)
- Time zone: UTC+01:00 (CET)
  - Summer (DST): UTC+02:00 (CEST)
- INSEE/Postal code: 61326 /61700
- ^{1} French Land Register data, which excludes lakes, ponds, glaciers > 1 km^{2} (0.386 sq mi or 247 acres) and river estuaries.

Perrou (French pronunciation: [pɛʁu]) is a commune in the Orne department in north-western France.

== Geography ==
The commune is made up of the following collection of villages and hamlets, La Surie, La Foutelaie, Perrou, Belle Fontaine and La Pierre Blanche.

The commune is in the Normandie-Maine Regional Natural Park.

Perrou along with the communes of Champsecret, Les Monts d'Andaine, Juvigny Val d'Andaine, Dompierre and Domfront en Poiraie shares part of the Bassin de l'Andainette a Natura 2000 conservation site. The site measures 617 hectares and is home to creatures such as the Bullhead, Brook lamprey and white-clawed crayfish.

== See also ==
- Communes of the Orne department
- Parc naturel régional Normandie-Maine
