= Results of the 2024 French legislative election in Orne =

Following the first round of the 2024 French legislative election on 30 June 2024, runoff elections in each constituency where no candidate received a vote share greater than 50 percent were scheduled for 7 July. Candidates permitted to stand in the runoff elections needed to either come in first or second place in the first round or achieve more than 12.5 percent of the votes of the entire electorate (as opposed to 12.5 percent of the vote share due to low turnout).

== Orne ==
=== 1st constituency ===
Candidate	Party or alliance		First round		Second round	
Candidate	Party or alliance		Votes	%	Votes	%
Nadine Belzidsky	National Rally		15,783	35.18	19,511	46.11
Chantal Jourdan	New Popular Front	Socialist Party	12,264	27.33	22,804	53.89
Patricia Chapelotte	Ensemble	Renaissance	9,658	21.52		
Manuela Chevalier	Miscellaneous centre	Independent	5,405	12.05		
David Géniteau	Sovereigntist right	Debout la France	570	1.27		
Camille Perchet	Far-left	Lutte Ouvrière	476	1.06		
Daniel Lecomte	Reconquête		450	1.00		
Didier Durandy	Miscellaneous right	Independent	263	0.59		
Total			44,869	100.00	42,315	100.00
Valid votes			44,869	97.06	42,315	91.40
Invalid votes			417	0.90	891	1.92
Blank votes			941	2.04	3,090	6.67
Total votes			46,227	100.00	46,296	100.00
Registered voters/turnout			68,184	67.80	68,189	67.89

=== 2nd constituency ===
Candidate	Party or alliance		First round		Second round	
Candidate	Party or alliance		Votes	%	Votes	%
Gérard Vienne	National Rally		17,502	40.01	19,621	45.57
Véronique Louwagie	Miscellaneous right	The Republicans	14,411	32.95	23,433	54.43
Guillaume Sacriste	New Popular Front	Miscellaneous left	7,336	16.77		
Amale El Khaledi	Ensemble	Horizons	3,060	7.00		
Bernadette Velly	Far-left	Lutte Ouvrière	470	1.07		
Séverine Prehu	Sovereigntist right	Debout la France	456	1.04		
Raymond Herbreteau	Reconquête		455	1.04		
Patrick Levacher	Independent		49	0.11		
Total			43,739	100.00	43,054	100.00
Valid votes			43,739	97.80	43,054	96.27
Invalid votes			266	0.59	389	0.87
Blank votes			719	1.61	1,279	2.86
Total votes			44,724	100.00	44,722	100.00
Registered voters/turnout			64,536	69.30	64,536	69.30

=== 3rd constituency ===
Candidate	Party or alliance		First round		Second round	
Candidate	Party or alliance		Votes	%	Votes	%
Jérôme Nury	Miscellaneous right	Independent	20,701	43.67	29,782	64.73
Ludmila Petchenina	National Rally		15,364	32.41	16,226	35.27
Lori Helloco	New Popular Front	Miscellaneous left	9,988	21.07		
Arnaud Gautier	Far-left	Lutte Ouvrière	857	1.81		
Sylvia Henot	Reconquête		488	1.03		
Total			47,398	100.00	46,008	100.00
Valid votes			47,398	97.72	46,008	96.06
Invalid votes			310	0.64	441	0.92
Blank votes			795	1.64	1,448	3.02
Total votes			48,503	100.00	47,897	100.00
Registered voters/turnout			70,653	68.65	70,656	67.79
