= Juvigny =

Juvigny may refer to the following places in France:

- Juvigny, Aisne, in the Aisne département
- Juvigny, Marne, in the Marne département
- Juvigny, Haute-Savoie, in the Haute-Savoie département
- Juvigny-en-Perthois, in the Meuse département
- Juvigny-le-Tertre, in the Manche département
- Juvigny-sous-Andaine, in the Orne département
- Juvigny-sur-Loison, in the Meuse département
- Juvigny-sur-Orne, in the Orne département
- Juvigny-sur-Seulles, in the Calvados département
