= Saint-Georges-de-Rouelley =

- Commune
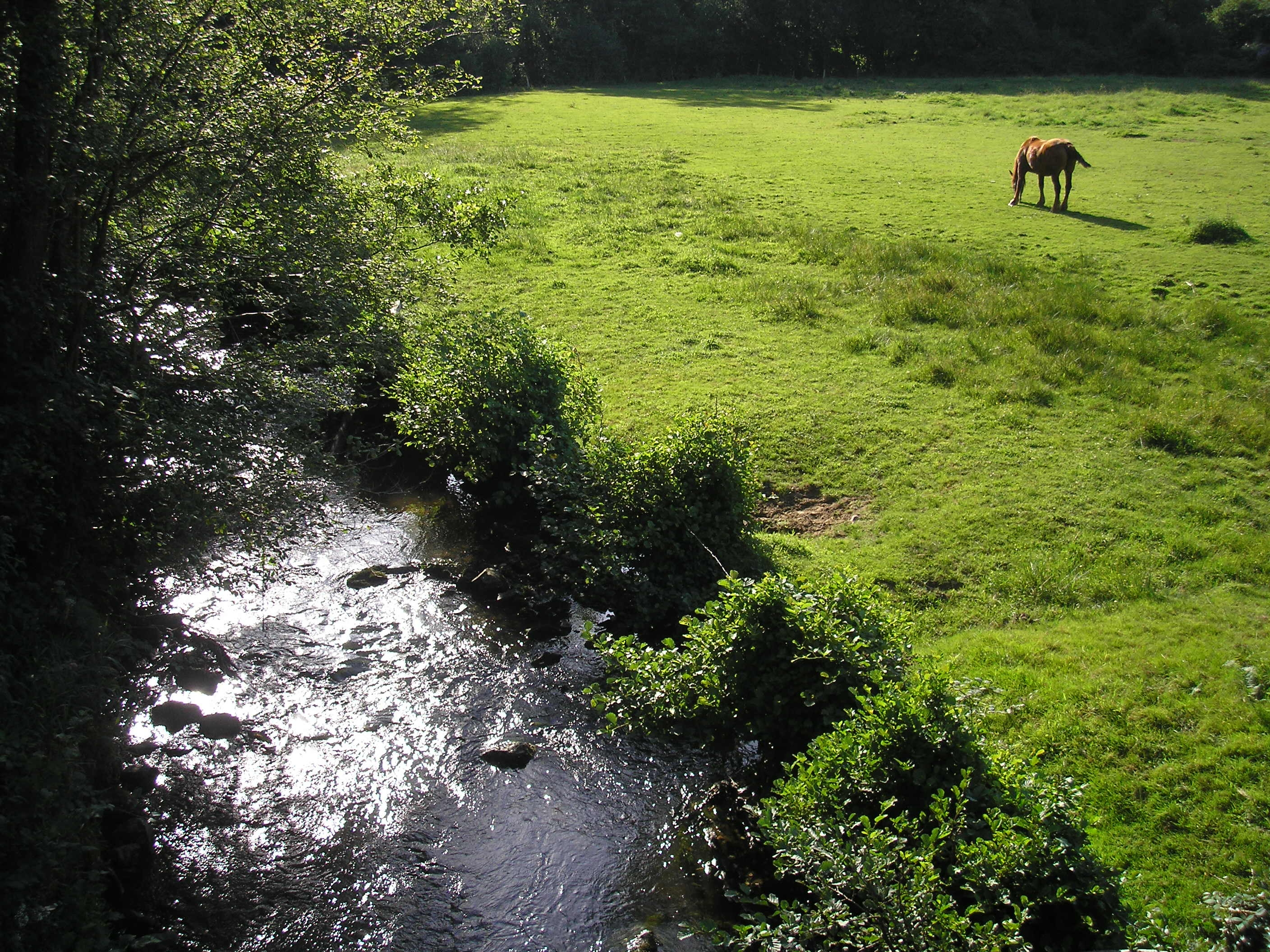
- The Sonce river in Saint-Georges-de-Rouelley
- Location of Saint-Georges-de-Rouelley
- Location within France Location within Normandy
- Coordinates: 48°36′15″N 0°46′03″W
- Country: France
- Region: Normandy
- Department: Manche
- Arrondissement: Avranches
- Canton: Le Mortainais
- Intercommunality: CA Mont-Saint-Michel-Normandie

Government
  - Mayor (2020–2026): Raymond Béchet
- Area^{1}: 20.52 km^{2} (7.92 sq mi)
- Elevation: 160 m (520 ft)
- Highest elevation: 283 m (928 ft)
- Lowest elevation: 119 m (390 ft)
- Population (2023): 515
  - Density: 25.1/km^{2} (65.0/sq mi)
- Time zone: UTC+01:00 (CET)
  - Summer (DST): UTC+02:00 (CEST)
- INSEE/Postal code: 50474 /50720
- ^{1} French Land Register data, which excludes lakes, ponds, glaciers > 1 km^{2} (0.386 sq mi or 247 acres) and river estuaries.

Saint-Georges-de-Rouelley (French pronunciation: [sɛ̃ ʒɔʁʒ də ʁwɛlɛ], literally Saint-Georges of Rouelley) is a commune in the Manche department in Normandy in north-western France.

== Geography ==
The commune is made up of the following collection of villages and hamlets, La Prise Guimont, Jutigny, Le Sionnay, La Masure, Saint-Georges-de-Rouelley, La Giboudière, Le Theil, Chanay and Les Haies.

The commune is in the Normandie-Maine Regional Natural Park.

Saint-Georges-de-Rouelley shares a Natura 2000 protected area, Landes du Tertre Bizet et Fosse Arthour, with two other communes Domfront en Poiraie and Lonlay-l'Abbaye.

== Points of Interest ==
- La Fosse Arthour - is a natural tourist site featuring a 70 metre gorge. It is accessible by the GR22 footpath.

== See also ==
- Communes of the Manche department
- Parc naturel régional Normandie-Maine
