= Forges =

Forges or Les Forges may refer to:

== In Belgium ==
- Forges, Belgium, a village and a former municipality that is now a part of Chimay, Wallonia

== In France ==
- Forges, Charente-Maritime, in the Charente-Maritime department
- Forges, Maine-et-Loire, in the Maine-et-Loire department
- Forges, Orne, in the Orne department
- Forges, Seine-et-Marne, in the Seine-et-Marne department
- Forgès, in the Corrèze department
- Les Forges, Deux-Sèvres, in the Deux-Sèvres department
- Les Forges, Morbihan, in the Morbihan department
- Les Forges, Vosges, in the Vosges department
- Forges-la-Forêt, in the Ille-et-Vilaine department
- Forges-les-Bains, in the Essonne department
- Forges-les-Eaux, in the Seine-Maritime department
- Forges-sur-Meuse, in the Meuse department
- Auvillers-les-Forges, in the Ardennes department
- Bailly-aux-Forges, in the Haute-Marne department
- Briis-sous-Forges, in the Essonne department
- Châtenois-les-Forges, in the Territoire de Belfort department
- Cousances-les-Forges, in the Meuse department
- Cussey-les-Forges, in the Côte-d'Or department
- Cussy-les-Forges, in the Yonne department
- Naix-aux-Forges, in the Meuse department
- Perrecy-les-Forges, in the Saône-et-Loire department
- Pontenx-les-Forges, in the Landes department
- Saint-Aubin-les-Forges, in the Nièvre department
- Saint-Bômer-les-Forges, in the Orne department
- Saint-Maurice-aux-Forges, in the Meurthe-et-Moselle department
- Sept-Forges, in the Orne department
- Sexey-aux-Forges, in the Meurthe-et-Moselle department

== People ==
- Antonio Fraguas de Pablo (born 1942), known by his artist name Forges, Spanish cartoonist
- Françoise Forges (born 1958), Belgian-born French economist

== See also ==
- Forge (disambiguation)
