= Landes du Tertre Bizet et Fosse Arthour =

Landes du Tertre Bizet et Fosse Arthour is a Natura 2000 conservation area that is 222 hectares in size.

== Geography ==
This site is made up of several environmental elements, where there is a mixture of forests, heather moors, rocky points and scree. There are two sectors to the protected area;

- The Tertre Bizet moor, occupying the northern slope of a small valley
- The Fosse Arthour, an example of a deep cut into the Armorican sandstone and strewn with scree on its sides.

It is spread across 3 different communes all within two departments the Orne and Manche;

1. Domfront en Poiraie
2. Lonlay-l'Abbaye
3. Saint-Georges-de-Rouelley

This protected site is within the Normandie-Maine Regional Natural Park.

== Conservation ==
The conservation area has one species listed in Annex 2 of the Habitats Directive, which is the southern damselfly.

In addition the Natura 2000 site has twelve habitats protected under the Habitats Directive.
