= Yves Deniaud =

Yves Deniaud may refer to:

- Yves Deniaud (actor), French comedian
- Yves Deniaud (politician), French politician
