= Henri François Anne de Roussel =

French naturalist

- Born: July 11, 1748; Saint-Bômer-les-Forges
- Died: February 17, 1812 (aged 63); Caen
- Education: University of Caen Normandy
- Occupation: Naturalist

Henri François Anne de Roussel (11 July 1748 in Saint-Bômer-les-Forges – 17 February 1812 in Caen) was a French naturalist.

He studied humanities and philosophy at the University of Caen, obtaining the rank of "maître ès-arts" in 1767. Afterwards he studied medicine in Caen, relocating to Paris in 1771, where he furthered his education. In 1773 he was appointed to the chair of medicine at Caen, where in 1786, he attained the chair of medical botany. Later on, he served as a professor of experimental physics and chemistry at the École centrale du Calvados.

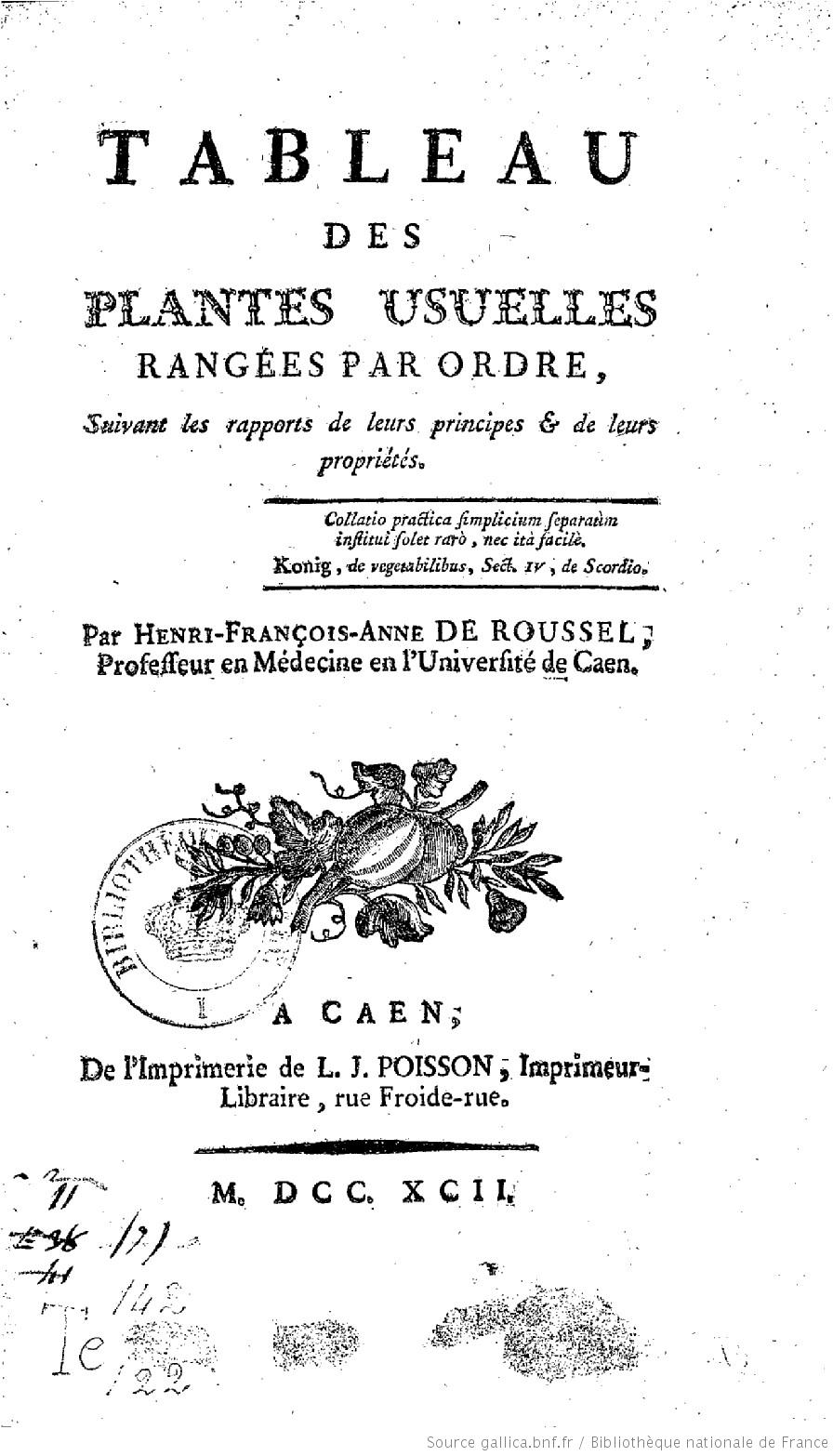
"Tableau des plantes usuelles rangées par ordre".

== Principal works ==
- Tableau des plantes usuelles rangées par ordre : suivant les rapports de leurs principes et de leurs propriétés, 1792 - Table of conventional plants, arranged in order according to reports of their principles and properties.
- Flore du Calvados et terreins adjacents, 1796 - Flora of Calvados and adjacent areas.
- Élémens de chymie et de physique expérimentale : à l'usage des Écoles centrales de Calvados, 1798 - Elements of chemistry and experimental physics, as utilized at the Écoles centrales du Calvados.

== Taxa ==
- Gymnopus (Persoon) Roussel, 1806 (family Marasmiaceae).
- Mycena (Persoon) Roussel, 1806 (family Mycenaceae).
