= Daniel Goulet =

French politician

Member of the French Senate for Orne
- In office 1 October 1992 – 25 February 2007
- Succeeded by: Nathalie Goulet

Member of the National Assembly for Orne's 1st constituency
- In office 2 April 1973 – 1 October 1992
- Preceded by: Louis Terrenoire
- Succeeded by: Yves Deniaud

Personal details
- Born: 28 October 1928 Bretoncelles, France
- Died: 25 February 2007 (aged 78) Abu Dhabi, United Arab Emirates
- Cause of death: Brain hemorrhage
- Resting place: Le Mêle-sur-Sarthe
- Party: RPR; UMP
- Spouse: Nathalie Goulet

Daniel Goulet (28 October 1928 – 25 February 2007) was a French politician. He served as a member of the French Senate and the National Assembly representing the department of Orne.

When he died he was posthumously awarded the insignia of the Order of Independence of the first rank by the United Arab Emirates.
