= Joaquim Pueyo =

French politician

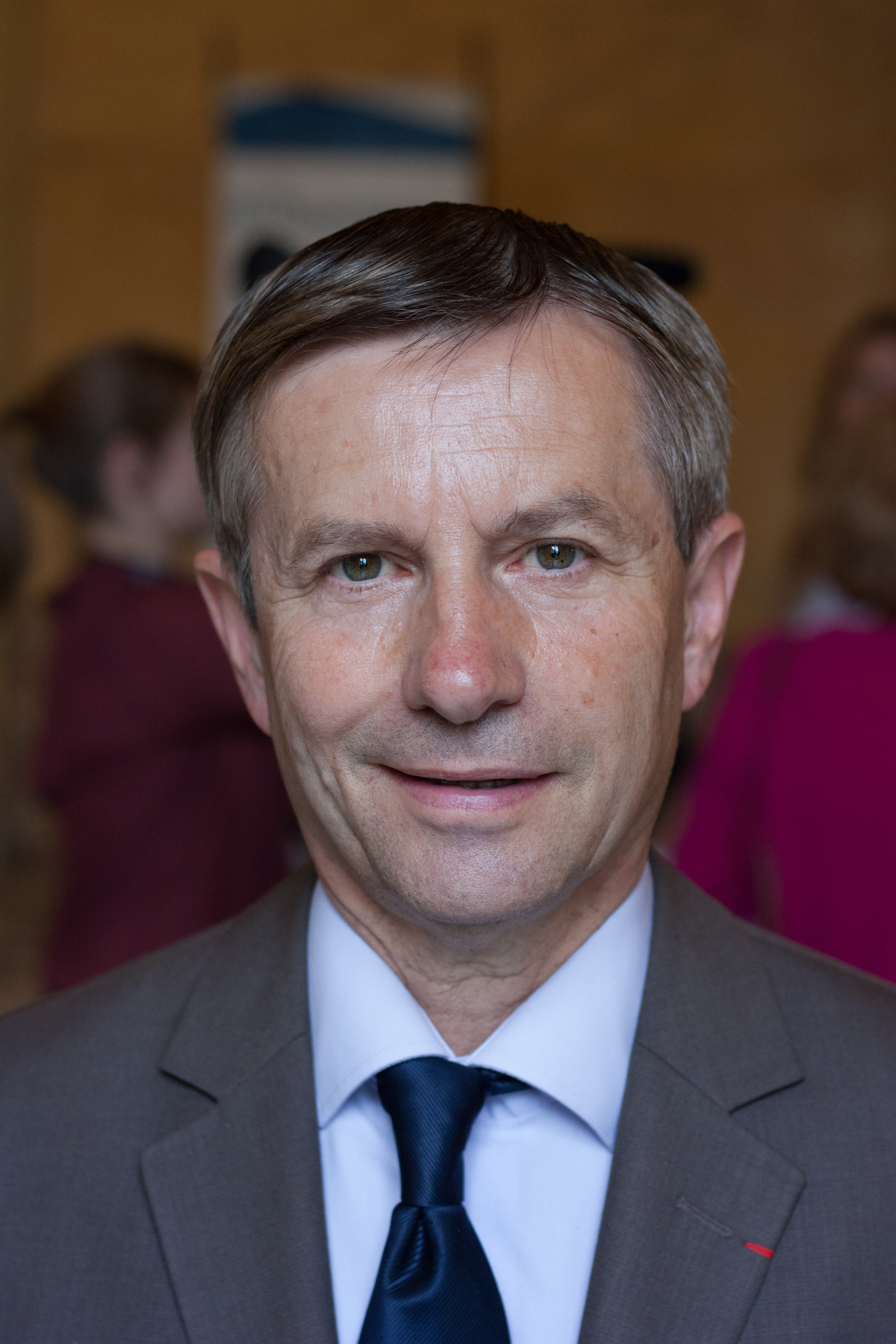
- Joaquim Pueyo in 2012

Mayor of Alençon
- Incumbent
- Assumed office 28 June 2020
- Preceded by: Emmanuel Darcissac
- In office 2008–2017
- Preceded by: Christine Roimier
- Succeeded by: Emmanuel Darcissac

Member of the National Assembly for Orne's 1st constituency
- In office 17 June 2012 – 2 August 2020
- Preceded by: Yves Deniaud
- Succeeded by: Chantal Jourdan

Personal details
- Born: 30 May 1950 (age 75) Alençon, France
- Party: Socialist Party

Joaquim Pueyo (born 30 May 1950) is a French politician representing the Socialist Party. He was re-elected to the French National Assembly on 18 June 2017, representing the department of Orne.

Pueyo had previously been appointed as the head of a prison in Fleury-Merogis in 2007. He had also been mayor of Livaie commune from 1983 to 2008, mayor of Alençon commune between 2008–2017 and from 2020, and councilor of Orne department from 1988 and 2012.

His election as Mayor in 2020 meant that the cumulation of mandates forced his resignation from the national assembly on 2 August 2020. He was replaced by his substitute, Chantal Jourdan.

== See also ==
- 2017 French legislative election
