= Saint-Denis-de-Villenette =

- Part of Juvigny Val d'Andaine
- Location of Saint-Denis-de-Villenette
- Location within France Location within Normandy
- Coordinates: 48°30′53″N 0°32′17″W
- Country: France
- Region: Normandy
- Department: Orne
- Arrondissement: Alençon
- Canton: Bagnoles-de-l'Orne
- Commune: Juvigny Val d'Andaine
- Area^{1}: 5.89 km^{2} (2.27 sq mi)
- Elevation: 133 m (436 ft)
- Highest elevation: 168 m (551 ft)
- Lowest elevation: 113 m (371 ft)
- Population (2022): 134
  - Density: 22.8/km^{2} (58.9/sq mi)
- Time zone: UTC+01:00 (CET)
  - Summer (DST): UTC+02:00 (CEST)
- Postal code: 61330
- ^{1} French Land Register data, which excludes lakes, ponds, glaciers > 1 km^{2} (0.386 sq mi or 247 acres) and river estuaries.

Saint-Denis-de-Villenette (French pronunciation: [sɛ̃ dəni də vilnɛt]) is a former commune in the Orne department in north-western France. On 1 January 2016, it was merged into the new commune of Juvigny Val d'Andaine.

== See also ==
- Communes of the Orne department
- Parc naturel régional Normandie-Maine
