= Beaulandais =

- Part of Juvigny Val d'Andaine
- Location of Beaulandais
- Location within France Location within Normandy
- Coordinates: 48°32′45″N 0°32′30″W
- Country: France
- Region: Normandy
- Department: Orne
- Arrondissement: Alençon
- Canton: Bagnoles-de-l'Orne
- Commune: Juvigny Val d'Andaine
- Area^{1}: 8.57 km^{2} (3.31 sq mi)
- Elevation: 160 m (520 ft)
- Highest elevation: 179 m (587 ft)
- Lowest elevation: 113 m (371 ft)
- Population (2023): 158
  - Density: 18.4/km^{2} (47.8/sq mi)
- Time zone: UTC+01:00 (CET)
  - Summer (DST): UTC+02:00 (CEST)
- Postal code: 61140
- ^{1} French Land Register data, which excludes lakes, ponds, glaciers > 1 km^{2} (0.386 sq mi or 247 acres) and river estuaries.

Beaulandais is a former commune in the Orne department in northwestern France. On 1 January 2016, it was merged into the new commune of Juvigny Val d'Andaine.

== See also ==
- Communes of the Orne department
- Parc naturel régional Normandie-Maine
