= Vienne's 2nd constituency =

Constituency of the National Assembly of France

2nd constituency of Vienne
- inline Constituency of the National Assembly of France

- A map of the constituency inside the Vienne department
- Deputy: Sacha Houlié; RE
- Department: Vienne
- Cantons: Poitiers III, Poitiers IV, Poitiers V, Poitiers VI, La Villedieu-du-Clain, Vivonne, Vouillé.

The 2nd constituency of Vienne is a French legislative constituency in the Vienne département. It is represented in the XVth legislature by Sacha Houlié, of Renaissance.

== Overview ==
The constituency covers the western part of the département. It includes the large town of Poitiers.

== Deputies ==
Election	Member	Party
1988	Jean-Yves Chamard	RPR
1993	Jean-Yves Chamard	RPR
1997	Philippe Decaudin	PS
2002	Jean-Yves Chamard	UMP
2007	Catherine Coutelle	PS
2012	Catherine Coutelle	PS
2017	Sacha Houlié	LREM
2022	Sacha Houlié	RE

== Election results ==
=== 2024 ===
Candidate	Party	Alliance	First round		Second round	
Candidate	Party	Alliance	Votes	%	Votes	%
Sacha Houlie	REN	Ensemble	18,855	33.21	23,895	41.90
Valérie Soumaille	LFi	NFP	16,254	28.63	18,666	32.73
Estelle Chevallier	RN		13,864	24.42	14,473	25.38
Aurélien Bourdier	Ind	DVG	5,723	10.08		
Xavier Augay	Ind	DVD	1,658	2.92		
Agnès Chauvin	LO		413	0.73		
Valid votes			56,767	97.57	57,034	97.43
Blank votes			896	1.54	1,076	1.84
Null votes			516	0.89	430	0.73
Turnout			58,179	72.54	58,540	72.98
Abstentions			22,028	27.46	21,679	27.02
Registered voters			80,207		80,219	
Result			REN HOLD			

=== 2022 ===
Legislative Election 2022: Vienne's 2nd constituency
Party	Candidate	Votes	%	±%
LREM (Ensemble)	Sacha Houlié	15,416	36.83	-4.92
LFI (NUPÉS)	Valérie Soumaille	14,394	34.39	+4.66
RN	Céline Philippe	5,641	13.48	+5.38
MDP	Frédéric Bouchareb	1,881	4.49	N/A
REC	Marie Dolores Prost	1,766	4.22	N/A
DVD	Aurélien Dessaux	1,184	4.22	N/A
Others	N/A	1,571	3.75	
Turnout		41,853	54.01	+2.17
2nd round result
LREM (Ensemble)	Sacha Houlié	20,267	51.19	-16.52
LFI (NUPÉS)	Valérie Soumaille	19,325	48.81	N/A
Turnout		39,592	53.22	+16.22
LREM hold				

=== 2017 ===
Legislative Election 2017: Vienne's 2nd constituency
Party	Candidate	Votes	%	±%
LREM	Sacha Houlié	16,776	41.75	
LR	Olivier Chartier	5,684	14.15	
LFI	Frédéric Abrachkoff	5,507	13.70	
PS	Patricia Persico	3,454	8.60	
FN	Pascale Bordin	3,256	8.10	
EELV	Yoann Magneron	1,961	4.88	
PCF	Christian Michot	1,023	2.55	
Others	N/A	2,522		
Turnout		40,183	51.84	
2nd round result
LREM	Sacha Houlié	19,423	67.71	
LR	Olivier Chartier	9,261	32.29	
Turnout		28,684	37.00	
LREM gain from PS				

=== 2012 ===
Legislative Election 2012: Vienne's 2nd constituency
Party	Candidate	Votes	%	±%
PS	Catherine Coutelle	20,832	47.32	
UMP	Olivier Chartier	11,867	26.96	
FN	Hubert Adeline	3,318	7.54	
PCF	Thierry Mirebeau	2,700	6.13	
EELV	Marie-Madeleine Jourbert	1,674	3.80	
MoDem	Nathalie Guillet	1,236	2.81	
Others	N/A	2,396		
Turnout		44,023	58.25	
2nd round result
PS	Catherine Coutelle	26,485	63.24	
UMP	Olivier Chartier	15,392	36.76	
Turnout		41,877	55.41	
PS hold				

=== 2007 ===
Legislative Election 2007: Vienne's 2nd constituency
Party	Candidate	Votes	%	±%
UMP	Jean-Yves Chamard	18,521	40.15	
PS	Catherine Coutelle	15,952	34.58	
MoDem	Françoise Colleau	3,929	8.52	
LV	Robert Rochaud	1,963	4.26	
Far left	Valérie Soumaille	1,424	3.09	
PCF	Françoise Poteau	1,300	2.82	
FN	Hubert Adeline	929	2.01	
Others	N/A	2,115		
Turnout		46,983	63.94	
2nd round result
PS	Catherine Coutelle	25,358	55.06	
UMP	Jean-Yves Chamard	20,699	44.94	
Turnout		47,270	64.33	
PS gain from UMP				

=== 2002 ===
Legislative Election 2007: Vienne's 2nd constituency
Party	Candidate	Votes	%	±%
UMP	Jean-Yves Chamard	20,979	44.70	
PS	Marie-Françoise Decaudin	14,937	31.82	
LV	Marie Legrand	3,116	6.64	
FN	Maxime Labesse	2,236	4.76	
CPNT	Charles Ottavy	1,593	3.39	
PCF	Catherine Bodin	955	2.03	
Others	N/A	3,120		
Turnout		47,881	69.22	
2nd round result
UMP	Jean-Yves Chamard	23,512	53.73	
PS	Marie-Françoise Decaudin	20,248	46.27	
Turnout		45,152	65.28	
UMP gain from PS				

=== 1997 ===
Legislative Election 1997: Vienne's 2nd constituency
Party	Candidate	Votes	%	±%
RPR	Jean-Yves Chamard	15,985	36.81	
PS	Philippe Decaudin	14,430	33.23	
FN	Claude Rouquet	3,753	8.64	
PCF	Michel Bodin	2,850	6.56	
LV	Daniel Lhomond	2,481	5.71	
DVD	Marie De Mascureau	1,492	3.44	
GE	Muriel Saillard	1,422	3.27	
LCR	Nadine Courilleau	1,010	2.33	
Turnout		45,832	70.02	
2nd round result
PS	Philippe Decaudin	23,852	51.50	
RPR	Jean-Yves Chamard	22,466	48.50	
Turnout		48,675	74.38	
PS gain from RPR				
