= Saint-Maurice-du-Désert =

- Part of Les Monts d'Andaine
- Location of Saint-Maurice-du-Désert
- Location within France Location within Normandy
- Coordinates: 48°36′41″N 0°23′13″W
- Country: France
- Region: Normandy
- Department: Orne
- Arrondissement: Argentan
- Canton: La Ferté-Macé
- Commune: Les Monts d'Andaine
- Area^{1}: 11.3 km^{2} (4.4 sq mi)
- Elevation: 300 m (980 ft)
- Highest elevation: 302 m (991 ft)
- Lowest elevation: 193 m (633 ft)
- Population (2022): 743
  - Density: 65.8/km^{2} (170/sq mi)
- Time zone: UTC+01:00 (CET)
  - Summer (DST): UTC+02:00 (CEST)
- Postal code: 61600
- ^{1} French Land Register data, which excludes lakes, ponds, glaciers > 1 km^{2} (0.386 sq mi or 247 acres) and river estuaries.

Saint-Maurice-du-Désert (French pronunciation: [sɛ̃ mɔʁis dy dezɛʁ]; literally "Saint-Maurice of the Desert") is a former commune in the Orne department in north-western France. On 1 January 2016, it was merged into the new commune of Les Monts d'Andaine.

== See also ==
- Communes of the Orne department
- Parc naturel régional Normandie-Maine
