= La Haute-Chapelle =

- Part of Domfront-en-Poiraie
- Location of La Haute-Chapelle
- Location within France Location within Normandy
- Coordinates: 48°36′20″N 0°40′12″W
- Country: France
- Region: Normandy
- Department: Orne
- Arrondissement: Alençon
- Canton: Domfront
- Commune: Domfront-en-Poiraie
- Area^{1}: 19.31 km^{2} (7.46 sq mi)
- Elevation: 200 m (660 ft)
- Highest elevation: 226 m (741 ft)
- Lowest elevation: 115 m (377 ft)
- Population (2022): 534
  - Density: 27.7/km^{2} (71.6/sq mi)
- Time zone: UTC+01:00 (CET)
  - Summer (DST): UTC+02:00 (CEST)
- Postal code: 61700
- ^{1} French Land Register data, which excludes lakes, ponds, glaciers > 1 km^{2} (0.386 sq mi or 247 acres) and river estuaries.

La Haute-Chapelle (French pronunciation: [la ot ʃapɛl]) is a former commune in the Orne department in north-western France. On 1 January 2016, it was merged into the new commune of Domfront-en-Poiraie.

== See also ==
- Communes of the Orne department
- Parc naturel régional Normandie-Maine
