= Nathalie Goulet =

French politician (born 1958)

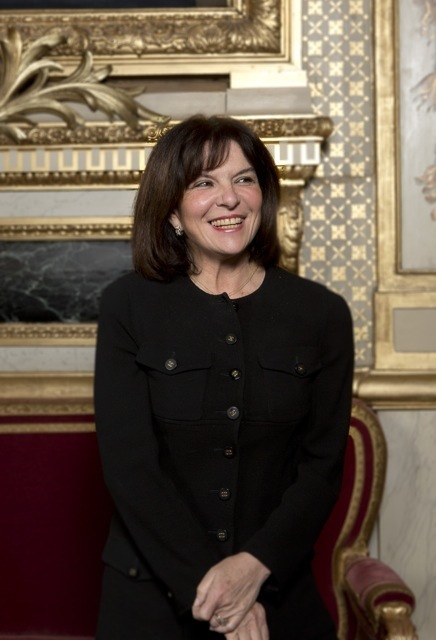

Senator for Orne
- Incumbent
- Assumed office 26 February 2007
- Preceded by: Daniel Goulet

Personal details
- Born: Nathalie Milsztein; 24 May 1958 (age 67) Boulogne-Billancourt, France
- Party: Union of Democrats and Independents
- Spouse: Daniel Goulet (2004–2007)
- Profession: Lawyer

Nathalie Goulet (French pronunciation: [natali ɡulɛ]; née Milsztein, 24 May 1958) is a French lawyer and politician who has served as a Senator for Orne since 2007, when she succeeded her husband Daniel Goulet as his substitute following his death. She is a member of the Union of Democrats and Independents (UDI) and sits with the Centrist Union group.

In the Senate, she is a member of the Committee on Finance. Goulet is active on a number of foreign policy issues, which has led to her being spied upon by Qatar, as RFI noted she is a "vocal critic of Qatar for allegedly financing Islamic terrorism".

== Biography ==
=== Family and private life ===
Milsztein comes from a Jewish family. Her father's family was deported during the Vel d'Hiv round-up in 1942, but her father survived.

A companion of Orne RPR senator Daniel Goulet (1928-2007), she became his parliamentary assistant in 1999, before deputising for him from September 23, 2001. She married him in 2004.

=== Education and professional career ===
After studying law, Nathalie Milsztein joined the Paris Bar.

Disbarred in January 2000 by the Paris Bar Council for serious breaches of professional ethics, a decision upheld on appeal in 2006, she lodged an appeal in cassation and was re-admitted to the Paris Bar in 2011. In December 2011, she applied for and obtained her omission.

In 2014, on her declaration of interests to the Haute Autorité pour la transparence de la vie publique, she declares that she no longer has any income as a lawyer and does not engage in any ancillary activities.
