= Orne's 1st constituency =

Constituency of the National Assembly of France

1st constituency of Orne
- inline Constituency of the National Assembly of France

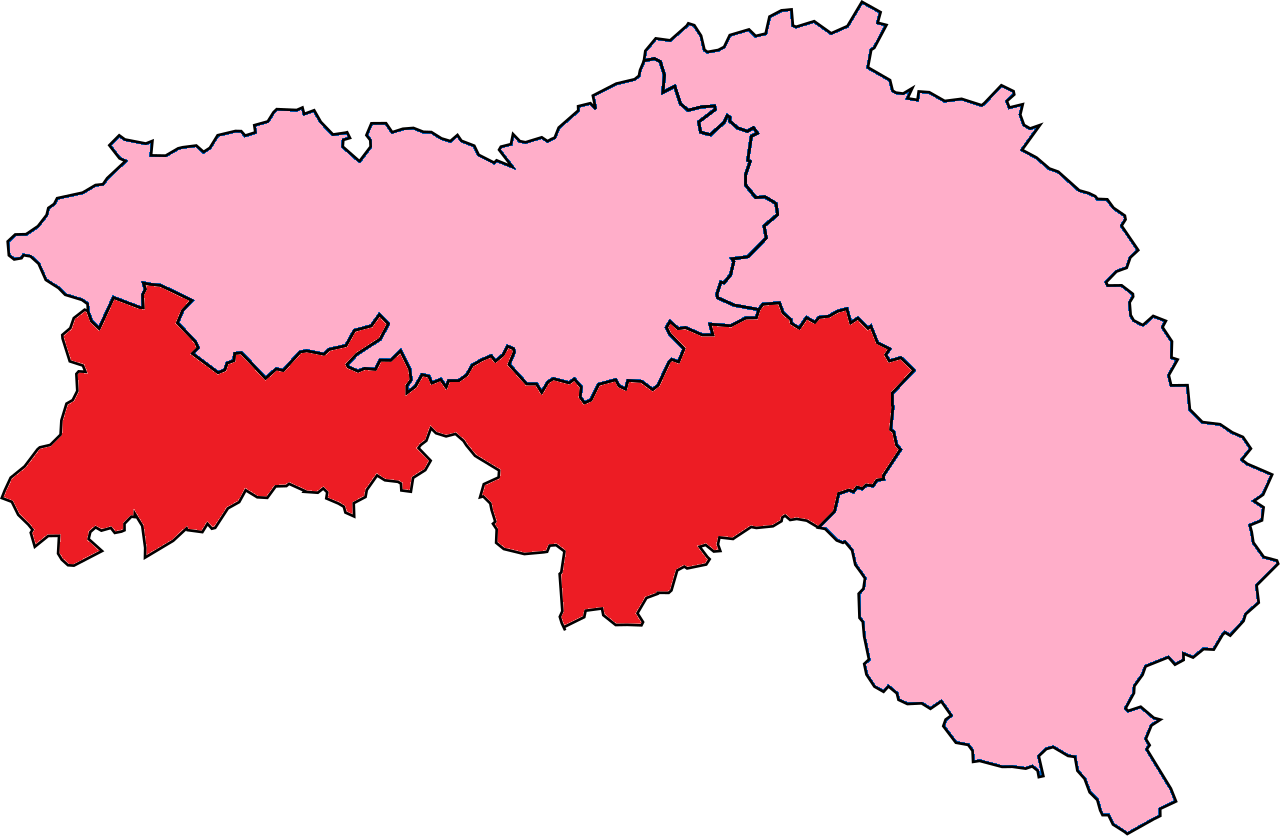
- Orne's 1st Constituency shown within Orne

- Orne in France
- Deputy: Chantal Jourdan; PS
- Department: Orne
- Cantons: Cantons de : Alençon I, Alençon II, Alençon III, Carrouges, Courtomer, Domfront, La Ferté-Macé, Juvigny-sous-Andaine, Le Mêle-sur-Sarthe, Passais, Sées
- Registered voters: 69513

The 1st constituency of the Orne (French: Première circonscription de l'Orne) is a French legislative constituency in the Orne département. Like the other 576 French constituencies, it elects one MP using a two round electoral system.

== Description ==
The 1st Constituency of the Orne includes the city of Alençon and the southwest third of the department.

Until 2012 the seat had consistently backed candidates from the conservative RPR and its successor the UMP. Unusually the constituency had no candidate from En Marche! at the 2017 election.

== Assembly Members ==
Election	Member	Party
1988	Daniel Goulet	RPR
1993	Yves Deniaud	RPR
1997	Yves Deniaud	RPR
2002	Yves Deniaud	UMP
2007	Yves Deniaud	UMP
2012	Joaquim Pueyo (Note: Elected Mayor of Alençon, then resigned from assembly due to cumulation of mandates)	PS
2017	Joaquim Pueyo	PS
2020	Chantal Jourdan (Note: substitute for Joaquim Pueyo)	PS
2022	Chantal Jourdan	PS

== Election results ==
=== 2024 ===
Legislative Election 2024: Orne's 1st constituency
Party	Candidate	Votes	%	±%
LO	Camille Perchet	476	1.06	n/a
REC	Daniel Lecomte	450	1.00	−2.80
DLF	David Géniteau	570	1.27	n/a
DVC	Manuela Chevalier	5,405	12.05	n/a
PS (NFP)	Chantal Jourdan	12,264	27.33	+1.48
DVD	Didier Durandy	263	0.59	n/a
RN	Nadine Belzidsky	15,783	35.18	+14.61
RE (Ensemble)	Patricia Chapelotte	9,658	21.52	−1.65
Turnout		44,869	97.06	+47.95
Registered electors		68,184		
2nd round result
PS	Chantal Jourdan	22,804	53.89	+26.56
RN	Nadine Belzidsky	19,511	46.11	+10.93
Turnout		42,315	91.40	−5.66
Registered electors		68,189		
PS hold		Swing		

=== 2022 ===
Legislative Election 2022: Orne's 1st constituency
Party	Candidate	Votes	%	±%
PS (NUPÉS)	Chantal Jourdan	8,448	25.85	-17.20
LREM (Ensemble)	Marie-Annick Duhard	7,572	23.17	N/A
RN	Myriam Maignan	6,723	20.57	+8.05
LR (UDC)	Bernard Soul	6,231	19.06	+2.77
REC	Oscar Piloquet	1,241	3.80	N/A
LMR	Sylvie Laplasse	708	2.17	N/A
Others	N/A	1,761	5.39	
Turnout		32,684	49.11	−0.44
2nd round result
PS (NUPÉS)	Chantal Jourdan	14,776	50.20	-2.30
LREM (Ensemble)	Marie-Annick Duhard	14,661	49.80	N/A
Turnout		29,437	47.44	+5.81
PS hold				

=== 2017 ===
Legislative Election 2017: Orne's 1st constituency
Party	Candidate	Votes	%	±%
PS	Joaquim Pueyo	10,441	30.31	
DVD	Christine Roimier	7,226	20.97	
LR	Bertrand Deniaud	5,614	16.29	
FN	Raymond Herbreteau	4,314	12.52	
LFI	Martine Hamel	2,865	8.32	
EELV	Isabelle Robert	1,522	4.42	
Others	N/A	2,471		
Turnout		34,453	49.55	
2nd round result
PS	Joaquim Pueyo	15,192	52.50	
DVD	Christine Roimier	13,746	47.50	
Turnout		28,938	41.63	
PS hold				

=== 2012 ===
2012 legislative election in Orne's 1st constituency
Candidate	Party	First round		Second round	
Candidate	Party	Votes	%	Votes	%
Joaquim Pueyo	PS	16,076	38.13%	21,908	53.05%
Bertrand Deniaud	UMP	9,590	22.75%	19,385	46.95%
Christophe De Balorre	UMP dissident	5,513	13.08%		
Lionel Stiefel	FN	4,199	9.96%		
Christian Lair	NC	3,490	8.28%		
Gérard Pommier	FG	1,607	3.81%		
Martine Roussel	EELV	954	2.26%		
Christine Coulon	NPA	283	0.67%		
Maria Senechal	AEI	251	0.60%		
Charlotte Sechet	LO	197	0.47%		
Valid votes		42,160	98.27%	41,293	96.61%
Spoilt and null votes		743	1.73%	1,449	3.39%
Votes cast / turnout		42,903	60.23%	42,742	60.01%
Abstentions		28,330	39.77%	28,479	39.99%
Registered voters		71,233	100.00%	71,221	100.00%
