= Catherine Coutelle =

French politician

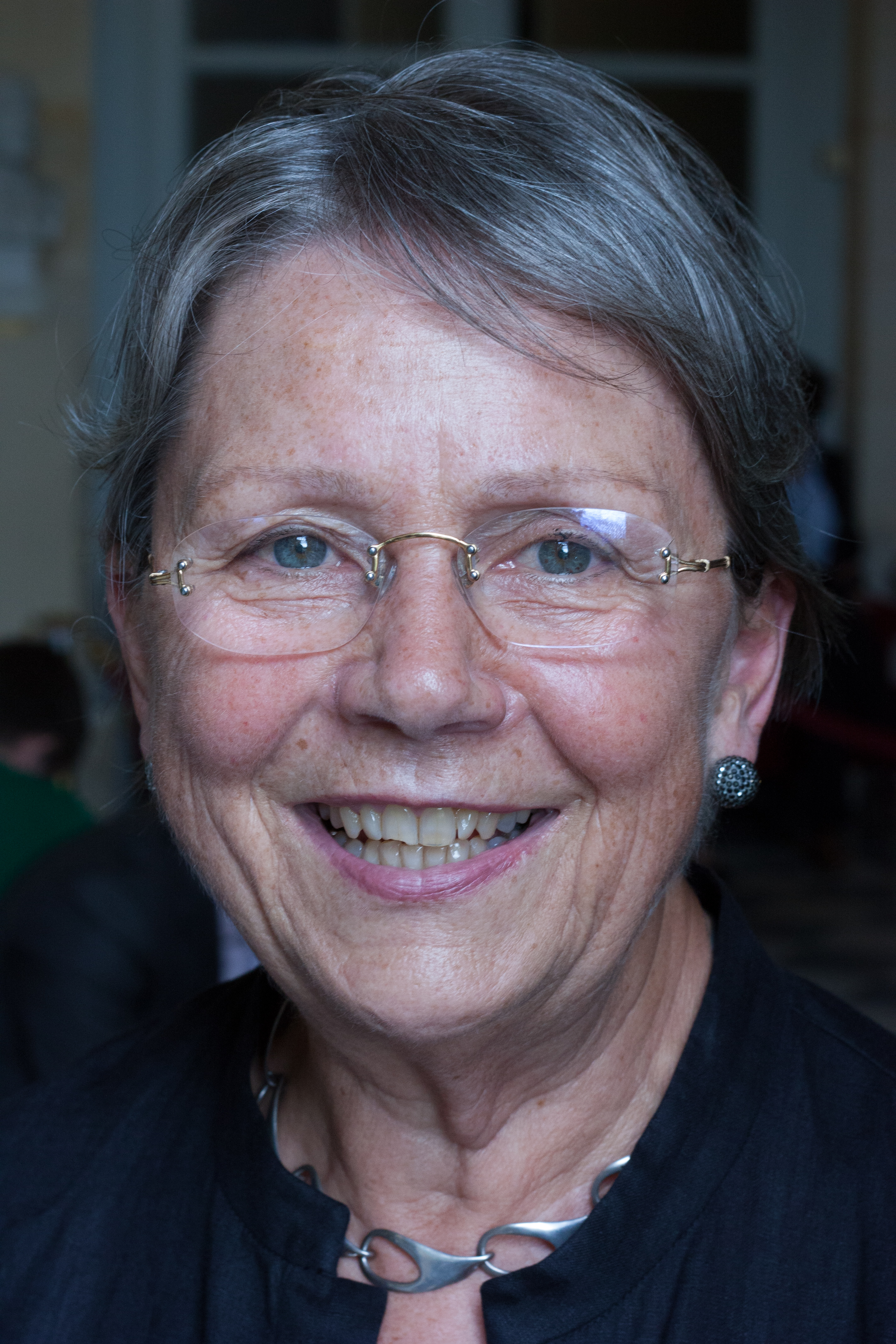
- Catherine Coutelle
- Born: April 2, 1945; La Sauvagère
- Occupations: Professor of history and geography IUFM trainer
- Political party: Socialist Party

Catherine Coutelle (born 2 April 1945 in La Sauvagère, Orne) is a former member of the National Assembly of France. She represented the 2nd constituency of the Vienne department, and is a member of the Socialist Party, which sits with the Socialist, Radical, Citizen and Miscellaneous Left group in the Assembly.

== Biography ==
A retired teacher and trainer, she was elected deputy on June 17, 2007, for the 13th legislature (2007-2012), in the 2nd district of Vienne (department). She was re-elected on June 17, 2012. She is a member of the Socialists and affiliated group.

City councilor (1983-1989), then deputy mayor (1989-2008) of Poitiers, she was also vice-president of the Poitiers urban community (1989-2008) and president (1995-2004), then vice-president of the national network “Femmes en mouvement, les transports au féminin” (Women on the Move, Transport for Women) under the Groupement des autorités responsables de transport (GART, Group of Transport Authorities).

She chairs the Delegation for Women's Rights and Equal Opportunities for Men and Women.
