= Lonlay-l'Abbaye =

- Commune
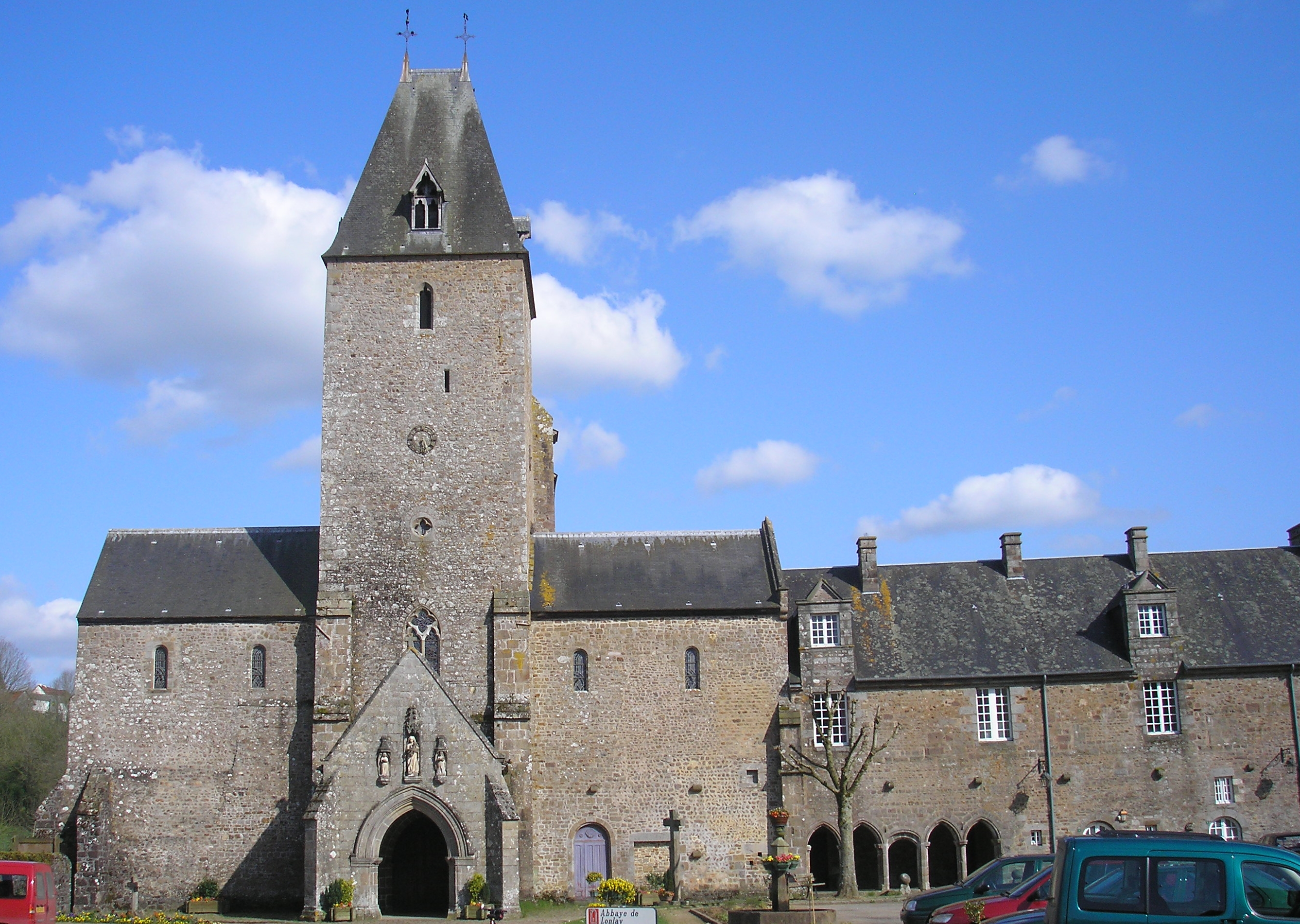
- Abbey
- Location of Lonlay-l'Abbaye
- Location within France Location within Normandy
- Coordinates: 48°38′50″N 0°42′31″W
- Country: France
- Region: Normandy
- Department: Orne
- Arrondissement: Argentan
- Canton: Domfront en Poiraie

Government
  - Mayor (2020–2026): Christian Derouet
- Area^{1}: 53.41 km^{2} (20.62 sq mi)
- Elevation: 145 m (476 ft)
- Highest elevation: 321 m (1,053 ft)
- Lowest elevation: 126 m (413 ft)
- Population (2023): 1,123
  - Density: 21.03/km^{2} (54.46/sq mi)
- Demonym: Lonléens
- Time zone: UTC+01:00 (CET)
  - Summer (DST): UTC+02:00 (CEST)
- INSEE/Postal code: 61232 /61700
- ^{1} French Land Register data, which excludes lakes, ponds, glaciers > 1 km^{2} (0.386 sq mi or 247 acres) and river estuaries.

Lonlay-l'Abbaye (French pronunciation: [lɔ̃lɛ labei]) is a commune in the Orne department in north-western France, situated midway between the towns of Domfront and Flers. It has a beautiful abbey and town square and is surrounded by walks and scenery, including the local viewpoint Fosse Arthur.

== Geography ==
The commune is made up of the following collection of villages and hamlets, Les Bordeaux, La Peignerie Masseron, Les Noës, L'Épine Orbière, La Thomassière, La Douardière, La Logerie, La Houdonnière, Lonlay-l'Abbaye, La Chapelière, Ranfougeray, Les Isles, La Bouscaudière, La Roche au Vesque, La Couvrie, Le Chemin Grippon and La Verdrie.

The commune is in the Normandie-Maine Regional Natural Park.

Lonlay-l'Abbaye shares a Natura 2000 protected area, Landes du Tertre Bizet et Fosse Arthour, with two other communes Domfront en Poiraie and Saint-Georges-de-Rouelley.

The river Égrenne flows through the commune.

== Points of interest ==
- Biscuiterie de l'Abbaye - is the factory of the Sablé de l’Abbaye biscuit that was first manufactured here in 1964, which today still produces biscuits and is open for tours.

=== National heritage sites ===
The Commune has two buildings and areas listed as a Monument historique.

- Notre-Dame Church: a thirteenth-century church that was registered as a monument in 1931.
- Sarcophage creusé dans un rocher à la Thomassière: remains of a Merovingian sarcophagus from the Middle Ages, registered as a Monument historique in 1933.

== Notable people ==
- René-Prosper Tassin - (1697 – 1777) a French historian was born here.
- François Bidard - (1992) a French professional cyclist was born here.

== Heraldry ==
Arms of Lonlay-L'Abbaye	The arms of Lonlay-L'Abbaye are blazoned : Sable, a wolf courant argent.

== Twin towns – sister cities ==
Lonlay-l'Abbaye is twinned with:

- (United Kingdom) Stogursey, in Somerset, England (since 1985)

== See also ==
- Communes of the Orne department
- Parc naturel régional Normandie-Maine
