= Auguste-François Maunoury =

- Born: October 30, 1811; Champsecret
- Died: November 17, 1898 (aged 87); Sées
- Occupation: Priest

Auguste-François Maunoury (b. at Champsecret, Orne, France, 30 October 1811; d. Séez, Orne, 17 November 1898) was a Catholic Hellenist and exegete.

== Biography ==
Maunoury studied classics at the preparatory seminary in Séez, to which institution he returned after his theological course, and where he spent the whole of his long priestly career. Until 1852, he taught the classics, and then became professor of rhetoric, a position which he occupied for twenty-two years. During this period, keeping abreast of the progress of Hellenistic studies in France and Germany, he composed, published and revised those of his works (Grammaire de la Langue Grecque, Chrestomathie etc.) which gained him a reputation as a Greek scholar. Towards 1866, Maunoury began his work as a biblical commentator, by treating some sections of the Gospel in the Semaine Catholique of his native diocese; but it was only after 1875, that he gave himself fully to the pursuit of biblical studies. In 1877, he became canon of the cathedral of Séez and, the following year, he began to publish his commentaries on all the Epistles of the New Testament.

== Works ==
Maunoury's commentaries appeared in five volumes, as follows:

1. Com. sur L'Epître aux Romains (Paris, 1878)
2. Com. sur les deux Epîtres aux Corinthiens (Paris, 1879)
3. Com. sur les Epîtres aux Galates, aux Ephésiens, aux Phillippiens, aux Colossiens, et aux Thessaloniciens (Paris, 1880)
4. Com. sur les Epîtres à Timothée, à Tite, à Philémon, aux Hébreux (Paris, 1882)
5. Com. sur les Epîtres Catholiques de St Jacques, St. Pierre, St. Jean et St. Jude (Paris, 1888)

In explaining the biblical texts, Maunoury made use of his familiarity with Greek grammar and authors, availing himself chiefly of the commentaries of John Chrysostom and Theodoret. In 1894, he published his Com. in Psalmos (Commentary on the Psalms; 2 vols., Paris), a Latin work, written almost exclusively on the basis of the Vulgate and the Septuagint. His only contribution to apologetics is a volume entitled Soirées d'Automne, ou la Religion prouvée aux gens du monde (Paris, 1887).
