= Loré =

- Part of Juvigny Val d'Andaine
- Location of Loré
- Location within France Location within Normandy
- Coordinates: 48°29′14″N 0°34′44″W
- Country: France
- Region: Normandy
- Department: Orne
- Arrondissement: Alençon
- Canton: Bagnoles-de-l'Orne
- Commune: Juvigny Val d'Andaine
- Area^{1}: 6.34 km^{2} (2.45 sq mi)
- Elevation: 200 m (660 ft)
- Highest elevation: 182 m (597 ft)
- Lowest elevation: 102 m (335 ft)
- Population (2022): 177
  - Density: 27.9/km^{2} (72.3/sq mi)
- Time zone: UTC+01:00 (CET)
  - Summer (DST): UTC+02:00 (CEST)
- Postal code: 61330
- ^{1} French Land Register data, which excludes lakes, ponds, glaciers > 1 km^{2} (0.386 sq mi or 247 acres) and river estuaries.

Loré is a former commune in the Orne department in north-western France. On 1 January 2016, it was merged into the new commune of Juvigny Val d'Andaine.

== See also ==
- Communes of the Orne department
- Parc naturel régional Normandie-Maine
