= Arboretum de l'Étoile des Andaines =

Arboretum in Champsecret, Orne, Normandy, France

Coordinates: 48.61°N 0.549°W

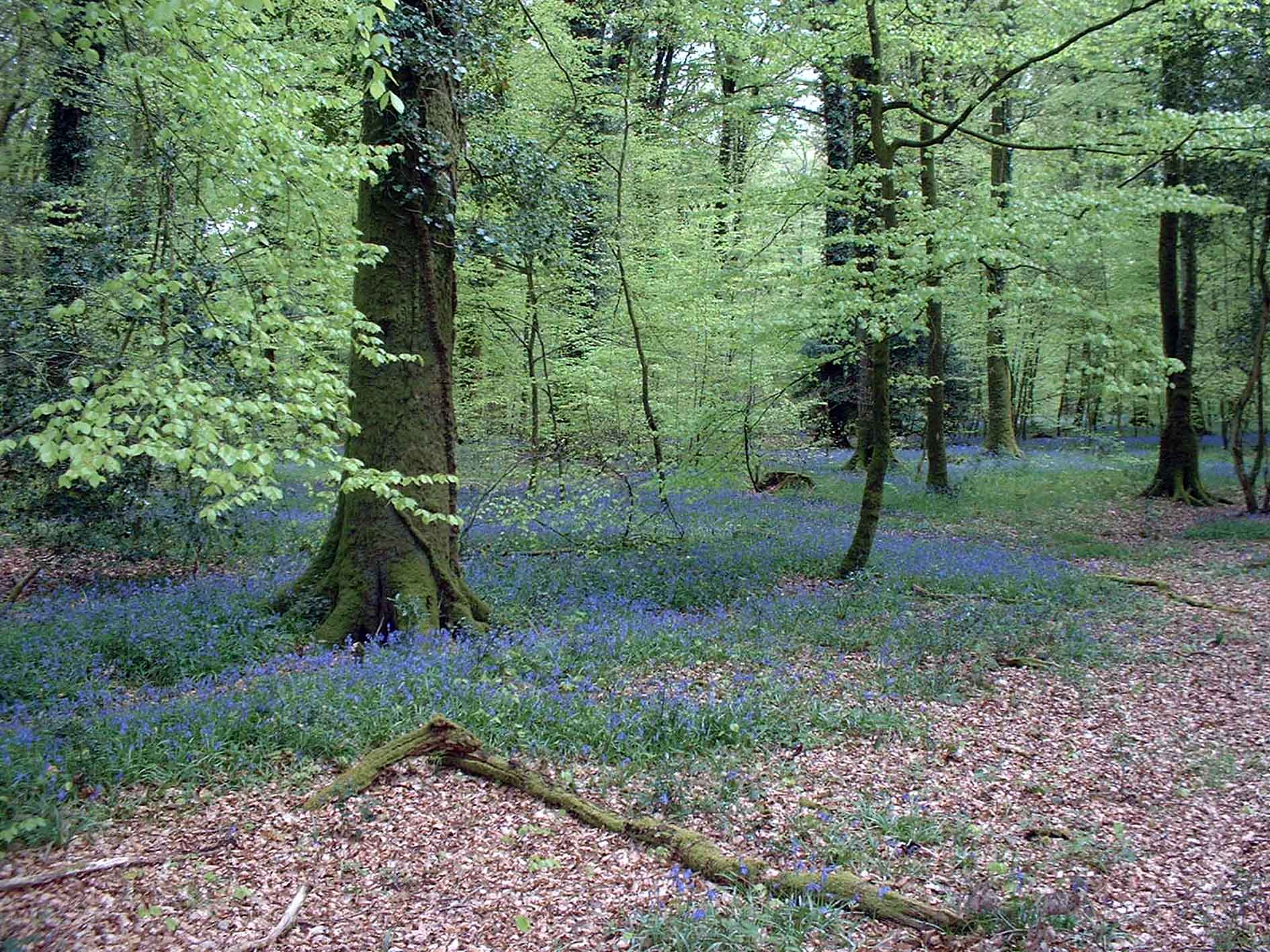
A forest in Andaines, Orne, France.

The Arboretum de l'Étoile des Andaines (5400ha) is an arboretum located in Champsecret, Orne, Normandy, France.

== History ==
The arboretum was created in 1947 by forestry chief Robert Julienne and today contains about 70 types of hardwood trees and conifers with a walking loop of two kilometers in length.

== See also ==
- List of botanical gardens in France
