= Juvigny-sous-Andaine =

- Part of Juvigny Val d'Andaine
- Location of Juvigny-sous-Andaine
- Location within France Location within Normandy
- Coordinates: 48°33′05″N 0°30′23″W
- Country: France
- Region: Normandy
- Department: Orne
- Arrondissement: Alençon
- Canton: Bagnoles-de-l'Orne
- Commune: Juvigny Val d'Andaine
- Area^{1}: 22.00 km^{2} (8.49 sq mi)
- Elevation: 200 m (660 ft)
- Highest elevation: 284 m (932 ft)
- Lowest elevation: 123 m (404 ft)
- Population (2022): 903
  - Density: 41.0/km^{2} (106/sq mi)
- Demonym: Juvignasiens
- Time zone: UTC+01:00 (CET)
  - Summer (DST): UTC+02:00 (CEST)
- Postal code: 61140
- ^{1} French Land Register data, which excludes lakes, ponds, glaciers > 1 km^{2} (0.386 sq mi or 247 acres) and river estuaries.

Juvigny-sous-Andaine is a former commune in the Orne department in north-western France. On 1 January 2016, it was merged into the new commune of Juvigny Val d'Andaine.

== Heraldry ==
Arms of Juvigny-sous-Andaine	The arms of Juvigny-sous-Andaine are blazoned : Azure, a lion argent armed and langued gules, overall 2 bars (couped) gules.

== See also ==
- Communes of the Orne department
- Parc naturel régional Normandie-Maine
