= Louis Corbière =

French botanist and mycologist (1850–1941)

- Born: François Marie Louis Corbière; 10 May 1850; Champsecret
- Died: 3 January 1941 (aged 90); Cherbourg
- Known for: botanist and mycologist
- Scientific career
- Author abbrev. (botany): Corb.

François Marie Louis Corbière (10 May 1850, Champsecret – 3 January 1941, Cherbourg) was a French botanist and mycologist.

He worked as a school teacher in the town of Sées, followed by similar duties in Argentan (1869). In 1882 he became a professor of sciences at the lycée in Cherbourg. Here he worked as a conservator at the city's natural history museum and as scientific director of the Parc Emmanuel-Liais.

In 1907 he became a member of the Société botanique de France, and for a period of time, served as president of the Société d'horticulture de Cherbourg. He was also a member of the Société des sciences naturelles de Cherbourg and the Société linnéenne de Normandie.

== Principal works ==
- Muscinées du département de la Manche, 1889 – Mosses native to the department of Manche
- Nouvelle flore de Normandie contenant la description des plantes qui croissent spontanément ou sont cultivées en grand dans les départements de La Seine-Inférieure, L'Eure, le Calvados, L'Orne & La Manche, 1893 – New flora of Normandy containing descriptions of native plants and those cultivated on a large-scale in the departments of Seine-Inférieure, Eure, Calvados, Orne and Manche
- Muscinées du Département du Var, 1921 – Mosses native to the department of Var
- Champignons de la Manche, 1929 – Mushrooms native to Manche.
