= Sept-Forges =

- Part of Juvigny Val d'Andaine
- Location of Sept-Forges
- Location within France Location within Normandy
- Coordinates: 48°29′35″N 0°32′19″W
- Country: France
- Region: Normandy
- Department: Orne
- Arrondissement: Alençon
- Canton: Bagnoles-de-l'Orne
- Commune: Juvigny Val d'Andaine
- Area^{1}: 8.55 km^{2} (3.30 sq mi)
- Elevation: 128 m (420 ft)
- Highest elevation: 182 m (597 ft)
- Lowest elevation: 107 m (351 ft)
- Population (2022): 244
  - Density: 28.5/km^{2} (73.9/sq mi)
- Time zone: UTC+01:00 (CET)
  - Summer (DST): UTC+02:00 (CEST)
- Postal code: 61330
- ^{1} French Land Register data, which excludes lakes, ponds, glaciers > 1 km^{2} (0.386 sq mi or 247 acres) and river estuaries.

Sept-Forges (French pronunciation: [sɛt.fɔʁʒ]) is a former commune in the Orne department in north-western France. On 1 January 2016, it was merged into the new commune of Juvigny Val d'Andaine.

== See also ==
- Communes of the Orne department
- Parc naturel régional Normandie-Maine
