= Rouellé =

- Part of Domfront-en-Poiraie
- Location of Rouellé
- Location within France Location within Normandy
- Coordinates: 48°36′06″N 0°43′30″W
- Country: France
- Region: Normandy
- Department: Orne
- Arrondissement: Alençon
- Canton: Domfront
- Commune: Domfront-en-Poiraie
- Area^{1}: 10.64 km^{2} (4.11 sq mi)
- Elevation: 125 m (410 ft)
- Highest elevation: 220 m (720 ft)
- Lowest elevation: 118 m (387 ft)
- Population (2022): 183
  - Density: 17.2/km^{2} (44.5/sq mi)
- Time zone: UTC+01:00 (CET)
  - Summer (DST): UTC+02:00 (CEST)
- Postal code: 61700
- ^{1} French Land Register data, which excludes lakes, ponds, glaciers > 1 km^{2} (0.386 sq mi or 247 acres) and river estuaries.

Rouellé (French pronunciation: [ʁwɛle]) is a former commune in the Orne department in north-western France. On 1 January 2016, it was merged into the new commune of Domfront-en-Poiraie.

== See also ==
- Communes of the Orne department
- Parc naturel régional Normandie-Maine
