= Yves Deniaud (politician) =

French politician

Member of the National Assembly for Orne's 1st constituency
- In office 1993–2012
- Preceded by: Daniel Goulet
- Succeeded by: Joaquim Pueyo

Personal details
- Born: 1 September 1946 (age 79) Casablanca, Morocco
- Party: UMP

Yves Deniaud (born 1 September 1946 in Casablanca) is a French politician, a member of the National Assembly. He represents the Orne department, and is a member of the Union for a Popular Movement.

== Biography ==
A sales executive by training, he was elected Deputy (France) for Orne on March 28, 1993, re-elected on June 1, 1997, then again on June 16, 2002, and in June 2007. A member of the Union for a Popular Movement group, he retired from politics in 2012 at the end of the 13th legislature.

He was made a Knight of the Legion of Honor by former UMP president Nicolas Sarkozy on March 31, 2016, in Valframbert.
