= Chantal Jourdan =

French politician

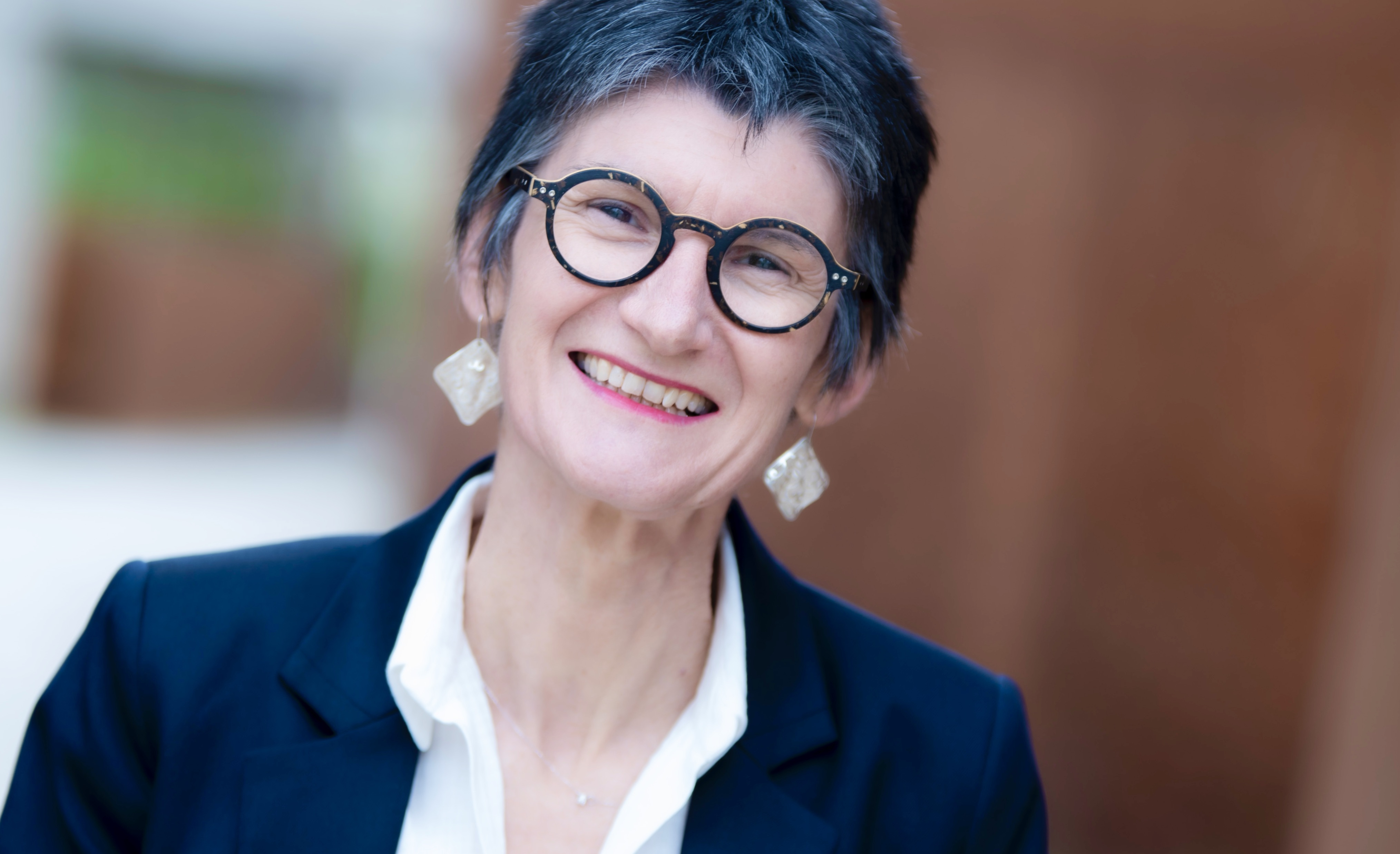

Member of the National Assembly for Orne's 1st constituency
- Incumbent
- Assumed office 3 August 2020
- Preceded by: Joaquim Pueyo

Personal details
- Born: 2 September 1958 (age 67) Domfront, France
- Party: Socialist Party

Chantal Jourdan (French pronunciation: [ʃɑ̃tal ʒuʁdɑ̃]; born 2 September 1958) is a member of the French National Assembly.

She was the substitute candidate for Joaquim Pueyo in the 2017 election and replaced him in 2020. She was re-elected narrowly in the 2022 election.

== Biography ==
Jourdan is a clinical psychologist. She is a member of the Socialist Party.

She was Mayor of Champsecret from 2008 to 2014. She unsuccessfully led a list in the 2014 and 2020 elections.

During the cantonal elections of 2011, Jourdan was a candidate in the Canton of Domfront, but she was not elected.

She was an unsuccessful candidate in the 2015 French departmental elections, in the Canton of Domfront.

She was the substitute candidate for Joaquim Pueyo in National Assembly elections in 2007, 2012 and 2017. Pueyo was elected mayor of Alençon in June 2020. The cumulation of mandates rule forced Pueyo's resignation from the national assembly on 2 August 2020, with Jourdan installed as deputy the next day.
