= La Sauvagère =

- Part of Les Monts d'Andaine
- Location of La Sauvagère
- Location within France Location within Normandy
- Coordinates: 48°37′27″N 0°24′58″W
- Country: France
- Region: Normandy
- Department: Orne
- Arrondissement: Argentan
- Canton: La Ferté-Macé
- Commune: Les Monts d'Andaine
- Area^{1}: 26.78 km^{2} (10.34 sq mi)
- Elevation: 800 m (2,600 ft)
- Highest elevation: 305 m (1,001 ft)
- Lowest elevation: 194 m (636 ft)
- Population (2022): 984
  - Density: 36.7/km^{2} (95.2/sq mi)
- Time zone: UTC+01:00 (CET)
  - Summer (DST): UTC+02:00 (CEST)
- Postal code: 61600
- ^{1} French Land Register data, which excludes lakes, ponds, glaciers > 1 km^{2} (0.386 sq mi or 247 acres) and river estuaries.

La Sauvagère (French pronunciation: [la sovaʒɛʁ]) is a former commune in the Orne department in north-western France. On 1 January 2016, it was merged into the new commune of Les Monts d'Andaine.

== See also ==
- Communes of the Orne department
- Parc naturel régional Normandie-Maine
