= Andainette =

- Location within France Location within Normandy
- Native name: l'Andainette (French)

Physical characteristics
- Source
  - location: Champsecret (Orne)
  - elevation: 250 m
- Mouth: Varenne
  - location: Pont de Pierre (Orne)
  - coordinates: 48°36′24″N 0°36′36″W
  - elevation: 142 m
- Length: 12.5 km (7.8 mi)
- Basin size: 41 km^{2} (16 sq mi)

Basin features
- Progression: Varenne→ Mayenne→ Maine→ Loire→ Atlantic Ocean

The Andainette (French pronunciation: [ɑ̃dɛnɛt]) is a river in the department of Orne, in the Normandy region, France. It is a left tributary of the Varenne, thus a sub-tributary of the river Loire via the Mayenne and Maine. It is 12.5 km (7.8 mi) long, and has a catchment area of 41 km^{2} (16 sq mi). The valleys of the Andainette and its tributaries are protected as a Natura 2000 site called Bassin de l'Andainette.
