= Varenne (Mayenne) =

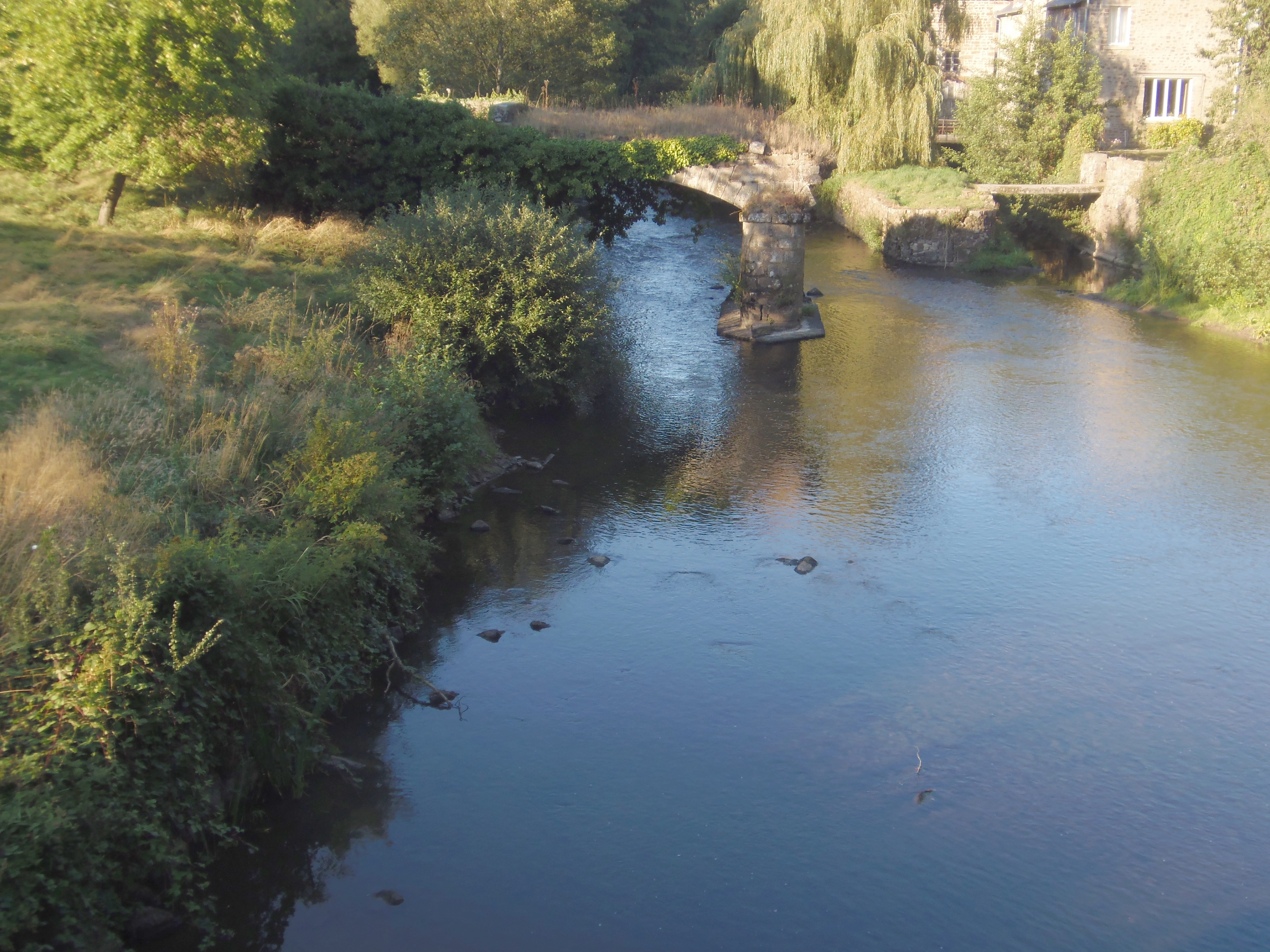
- The Varenne near Ceaucé

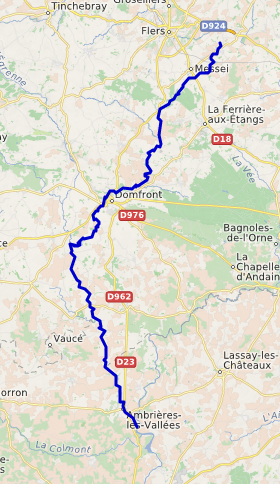

Location
- Country: France

Physical characteristics
- Mouth
  - location: Mayenne
  - coordinates: 48.3868°N 0.6107°W
- Length: 60.0 km (37.3 mi)

Basin features
- Progression: Mayenne→ Maine→ Loire→ Atlantic Ocean

The Varenne (French pronunciation: [vaʁɛn]) is a 60.0 km (37.3 mi) long river in western France located in the departments of Orne (Normandy) and Mayenne (Pays de la Loire). It is a tributary of the river Mayenne on the right side, and so is a sub-tributary of the Loire by Mayenne and Maine. It flows into the Mayenne near Ambrières-les-Vallées. Its longest tributaries are the Égrenne, the Pisse, the Halouze and the Andainette. The largest town on the Varenne is Domfront en Poiraie.
