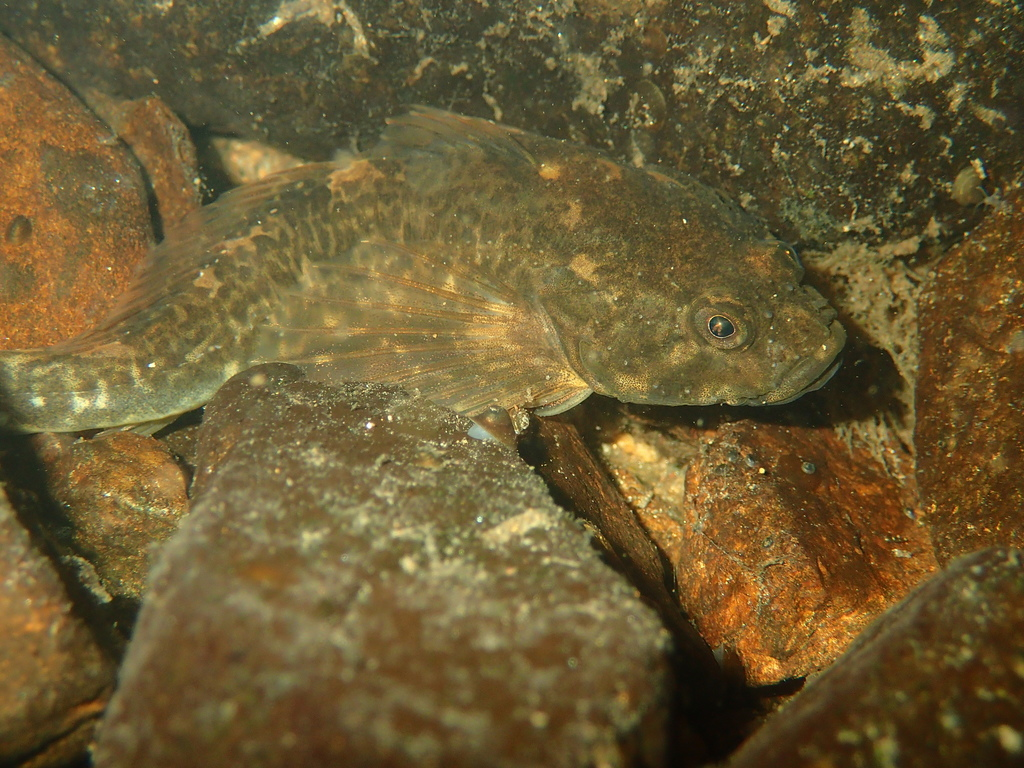

Conservation status
- Least Concern (IUCN 3.1)

Scientific classification
- Kingdom: Animalia
- Phylum: Chordata
- Class: Actinopterygii
- Order: Perciformes
- Suborder: Cottoidei
- Family: Cottidae
- Genus: Cottus
- Species: C. perifretum

Binomial name
- Cottus perifretum Freyhof, Kottelat and Nolte, 2005

= Cottus perifretum =

Species of fish

Cottus perifretum, the bullhead or miller's thumb, is a species of freshwater ray-finned fish belonging to the family Cottidae, the typical sculpins. It is found on both sides of the English Channel, native to Great Britain. It also inhabits Atlantic drainages from the Garonne River (tributaries draining from Massif Central) to the Scheldt in France and Belgium, and the Moselle and Sieg in Germany. It is considered invasive in the Rhine drainage in Germany and the Netherlands. This invasive population in the Rhine is an intermediate between this species and Cottus rhenanus. Although this species is native to England and Wales it is considered to be a non-native invasive species in Scotland.

This species was described as a separate species from the European bullhead (C. gobio) in 2005 by Jörg Freyhof, Maurice Kottelat and Arne W. Nolte. The specific name perifretum is a combination of peri, meaning "around", and fretum, meaning "straits", an allusion to the species distribution on either side of the English Channel, called Fretum Gallicum in Latin.

It reaches a maximum length of 13.4 cm (5.3 in). It prefers small streams to medium-sized rivers.
