= Épinay =

Épinay may refer to the following communes in France:

- Épinay, Eure, in the Eure département
- Épinay-Champlâtreux, in the Val-d'Oise département
- Épinay-sous-Sénart, in the Essonne département
- Épinay-sur-Duclair in the Seine-Maritime département
- Épinay-sur-Odon, in the Calvados département
- Épinay-sur-Orge, in the Essonne département
- Épinay-sur-Seine, in the Seine-Saint-Denis département
- L'Épinay-le-Comte, in the Orne département
- Cartigny-l'Épinay, in the Calvados département
- Saint-Aubin-Épinay, in the Seine-Maritime département

== See also ==
- Epinay Congress
