= Passais Villages =

- Commune
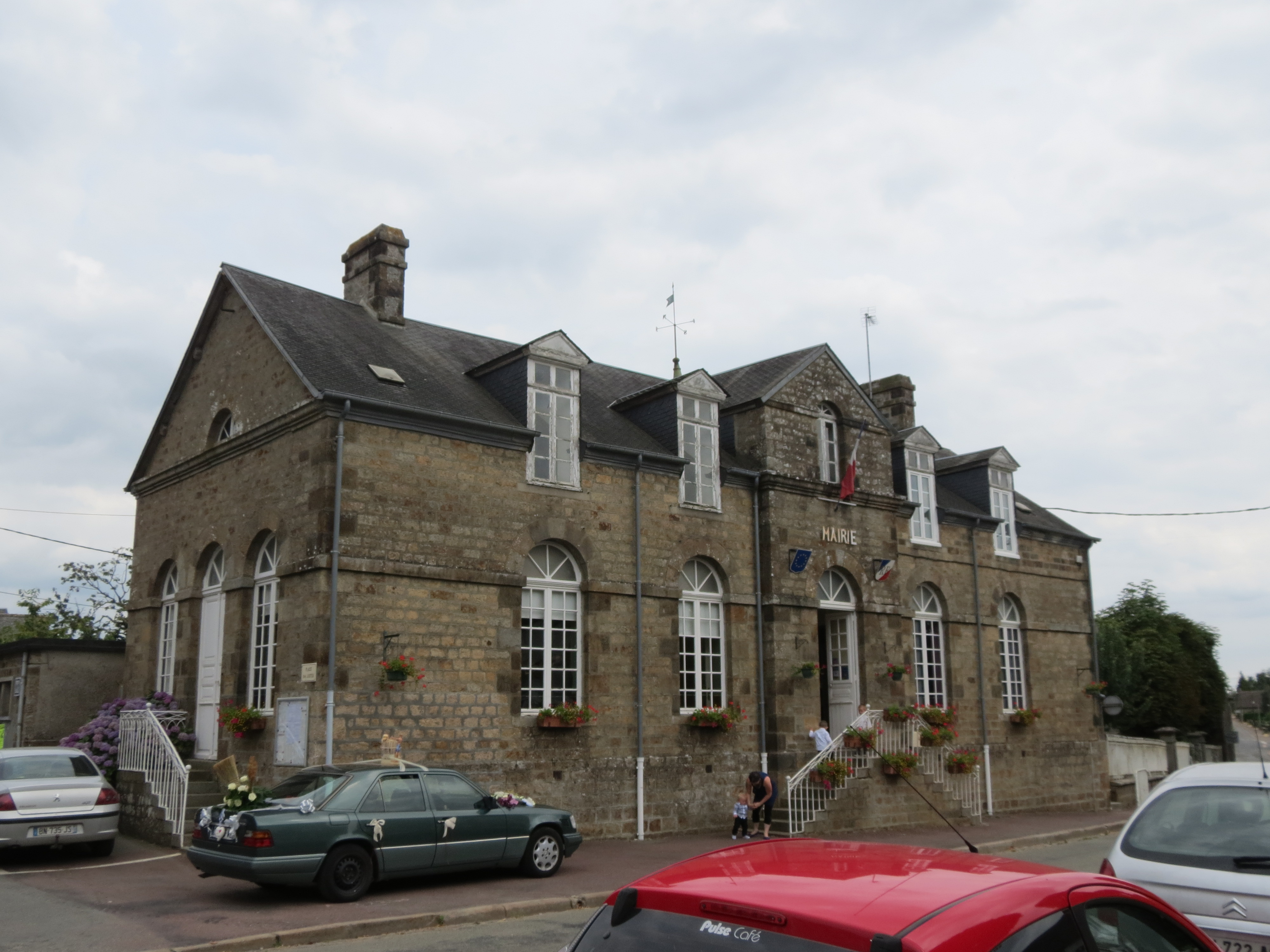
- The town hall in Passais
- Location of Passais Villages
- Location within France Location within Normandy
- Coordinates: 48°31′05″N 0°45′25″W
- Country: France
- Region: Normandy
- Department: Orne
- Arrondissement: Alençon
- Canton: Bagnoles de l'Orne Normandie
- Intercommunality: Andaine-Passais

Government
  - Mayor (2020–2026): Dominique Morel
- Area^{1}: 42.36 km^{2} (16.36 sq mi)
- Population (2023): 1,160
  - Density: 27.4/km^{2} (70.9/sq mi)
- Time zone: UTC+01:00 (CET)
  - Summer (DST): UTC+02:00 (CEST)
- INSEE/Postal code: 61324 /61350
- ^{1} French Land Register data, which excludes lakes, ponds, glaciers > 1 km^{2} (0.386 sq mi or 247 acres) and river estuaries.

Passais Villages (French pronunciation: [pasɛ vilaʒ]) is a commune in the department of Orne, northwestern France. The municipality was established on 1 January 2016 by merger of the former communes of L'Épinay-le-Comte, Passais (the seat) and Saint-Siméon.

== Geography ==
The commune is made up of the following collection of villages and hamlets, Passais, L'Épinay-le-Comte, Saint-Siméon, La Richardière and Beslay.

The river Colmont flows through the commune.

The commune is in the Normandie-Maine Regional Natural Park.

== Points of interest ==
- Combles de la chapelle de l'Oratoire de Passais is the attic of the l'Oratoire de Passais chapel, which is listed as a Natura 2000 conservation site. The chapel roof contains a nest of Greater mouse-eared bats, which are listed in Annex 2 of the Habitats Directive.

=== National heritage sites ===
The commune has four buildings and areas listed as a Monument historique.

- Devil's Table Dolmen a Neolithic dolmen, it was registered as a monument in 1973.
- L'Épinay-le-Comte Manor a twelfth-century manor house, registered as a Monument historique in 1940.
- Manoir de la Guerinière a fifteenth-century manor house, registered as a Monument historique in 1975.
- Menhir du Perron a Neolithic Menhir, registered as a Monument historique in 1926.

== Notable people ==
- Julien Alexandre Achard de Bonvouloir - (1749 – 1783) was a secret French envoy to the American colonies who was born here.

== See also ==
- Communes of the Orne department
