= Bagnoles-de-l'Orne =

Commune in Orne, France

- Part of Bagnoles-de-l'Orne-Normandie
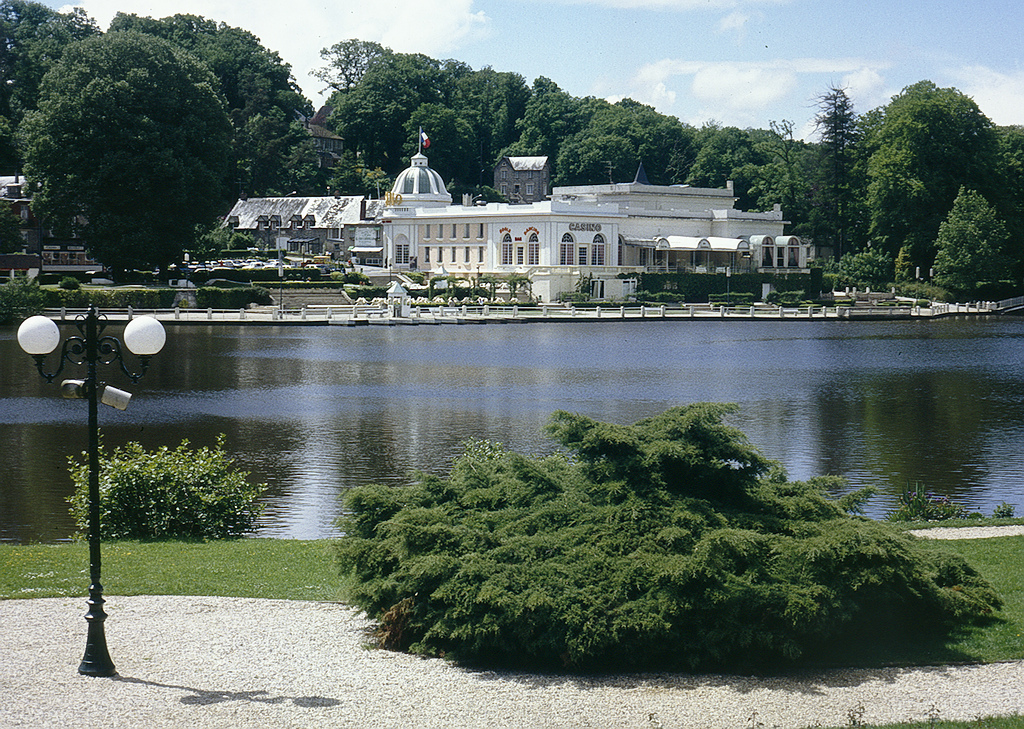
- Lake and casino
- Location of Bagnoles-de-l'Orne
- Location within France Location within Normandy
- Coordinates: 48°32′59″N 0°25′25″W
- Country: France
- Region: Normandy
- Department: Orne
- Arrondissement: Alençon
- Canton: Bagnoles-de-l'Orne
- Commune: Bagnoles-de-l'Orne-Normandie
- Area^{1}: 9.26 km^{2} (3.58 sq mi)
- Elevation: 200 m (660 ft)
- Population (2022): 2,385
  - Density: 258/km^{2} (667/sq mi)
- Time zone: UTC+01:00 (CET)
  - Summer (DST): UTC+02:00 (CEST)
- Postal code: 61140
- ^{1} French Land Register data, which excludes lakes, ponds, glaciers > 1 km^{2} (0.386 sq mi or 247 acres) and river estuaries.

Bagnoles-de-l'Orne is a former commune in the Orne department in northwestern France. On 1 January 2000, Tessé-la-Madeleine and Bagnoles-de-l'Orne merged becoming one town called Bagnoles-de-l'Orne, however, it adopted the former Insee code of Tessé-la-Madeleine (61483) for identification purposes. It is classed as a Petites Cités de Caractère. On 1 January 2016, it was merged into the new commune of Bagnoles-de-l'Orne-Normandie.

== Population ==
Population data refer to the area corresponding with the commune as of 2015, i.e. Tessé-la-Madeleine and Bagnoles-de-l'Orne combined.

Historical population
Year	Pop.	±% p.a.
1962	1,371	—
1968	1,456	+1.01%
1975	1,441	−0.15%
1982	1,716	+2.53%
1990	1,966	+1.71%
1999	2,172	+1.11%
2013	2,359	+0.59%
2022	2,385	+0.12%
Source: EHESS and INSEE

== Spa ==
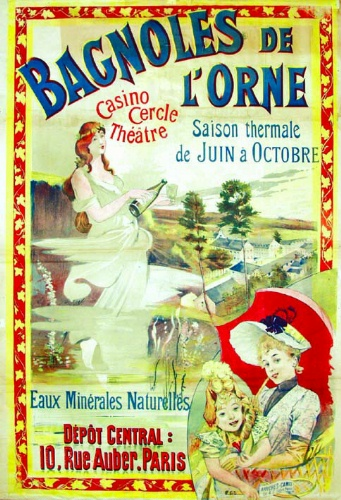
Advertising poster dating from the turn of the 20th century

This commune is famous for its Hydrotherapy baths, which are known for their supposed healing powers for rheumatic, gynaecologic and circulatory problems. The origins of thermal activity are said to date back to the Middle Ages. The spa is centred on the lake, which is formed by the River La Vée, a tributary of the Mayenne, before it enters a deep gorge cut through the massif of the Andaines Forest.

Local legend tells of the medieval lord, Seigneur Hugues de Tessé. Believing that his once-glorious horse, "Rapide", was reaching the end of its life, Seigneur Hugues decided to abandon it in the Andaines Forest. He was amazed when the animal returned home some time later, strong and totally revitalized. Without resentment, "Rapide" took its master along to the waters of Bagnoles where the horse drank and was also rejuvenated. The spa was born.

According to another tale, a very old Franciscan friar who took the waters in Bagnoles found astonishing new vigour and leapt across the highest rocks above the town, which are still called "Le Saut du Capucin" (The Monk's Leap).

The village is associated with Arthurian legends, as the supposed homeland of Lancelot. The village's calendar of cultural events includes a visit of the most famous Arthurian sites.

== The "Belle Époque" Quarter ==
The "Belle Époque" Quarter in Bagnoles-de-l'Orne constitutes a rather well preserved example of what could be classed as a typical early 20th century French bourgeoise residential area. Built between 1886 and 1914 and located in the southern part of the town, it is filled with superb villas with polychrome façades, bow windows and unique roofing. Similar projects were developed throughout France at the same time, among which are Le Vésinet close to Paris, the Saurupt Park in Nancy and the "Winter Town" of Arcachon.

Built under strict construction regulations and intended for well-off 'curists', that is, those attending the spa facilities, the idea of a residential area right in the heart of the Normandy forest attracted a very wealthy clientele. Moreover, when it was built, going to thermal pools was not generally popular, but seen, rather, as being associated with elitism, luxury and the aspirations of the privileged social classes, who took pleasure in promoting nature as a place of healing.

Bagnoles-de-l'Orne has been visited or inhabited at various times by figures including the King and Queen of Romania, Frank Jay Gould, the Prince of Montenegro, the Prince of Greece, Princess Bibesco, the Princess of Batenberg, Édouard Herriot, Alexandre Dumas (the father), and the Maharani of Kapurthala.

The architectural constructions such as the Villas "Printania", "Le Castel", or the "Swedish Country cottage", as well as the presence of large lavish hotels, illustrate the style of the "Fin de siècle" period. These constructions are inspired by the Norman neo-regionalist style, such as in the Côte Fleurie (Flowered coast) resorts of Deauville, and Trouville, which display the distinctive "Bagnolais" architectural style.

== Art Deco architecture ==
After the long break caused by World War I, the development of tourism in Bagnoles-de-l'Orne eventually continued.

During this second period of great affluence, known in France as "Les Années Folles" ("Roaring Twenties"), the success of Bagnoles-de-l'Orne increased. The thermal season was filled with classical music concerts, horse races at the Hippodrome, golf tournaments as well as other sophisticated leisure activities. The demand for entertainment was high and a second casino was eventually built.

In keeping with the height of fashion, the buildings erected during this period were highly influenced by the "Art Deco" style, which was popular in the 1920s and 1930s.

Probably the most interesting examples of this type of architecture are the "Casino du Lac", built in 1927 by the renowned architect Auguste Bluysen, and the "Sacré Cœur Church" (1934). Both buildings have met the challenge to integrate well with the greenery of the surrounding landscape, while adding a touch of modern design, based on the use of geometric shapes and shades of white.

== Heraldry ==
Arms of Bagnoles-de-l'Orne	The arms of Bagnoles-de-l'Orne are blazoned : Argent, 4 fesses wavy azure, chaussé vert, and on a chief gules, a leopard armed and langued azure.

== The Henri Cibois and Benjamin Saunier affair ==
The story of the attack and robbery against the Goupil widow, in the Tessé-la-Madeleine quarter of Bagnoles, in 1907, is well known in the area.

At the end of the reign of Louis XVI, the Goupil family lived in quite modest circumstances in Tessé, which was the original village and is now a part of Bagnoles. The Goupil had two sons, Jean and Louis, who, having both been missing since the French Revolution, reappeared and settled back in Tessé, in 1829. In 1825, they set about building a grand house called, at that time, "Le Logis", on the Place de L'Eglise. The locals expressed surprise at the Goupil brothers' apparent sudden rise to prosperity. The brothers died in 1850, taking with them the secret of their financial success. Soon after their death, Anne-Marie Goupil, the daughter of Jean and young wife, and so, widow of Louis, built a new house known as the "Chateau Goupil", which is now known as Château de la Roche Bagnoles and is Bagnoles' present Town Hall. Madame Goupil moved into the chateau and continued to live there for the rest of her life, with her son and daughter.

The locals were said to be suspicious of where the Goupil had originally gained their wealth, but whether or not that led to the events which brought about the attack on Madame Goupil is not known.

On the night of 3 to 4 December 1907, Henri Cibois, a 24-year-old wheelwright, broke into the chateau with seventeen-year-old lumberman, Benjamin Saunier. Madame Goupil, now seventy-two years old, was beaten unconscious and suffered multiple stab wounds. Cibois and Saunier stole 700 francs, jewellery and three bottles of champagne.

For his crime, Henri Cibois went to the guillotine on 11 August 1908, with his accomplice, Benjamin Saunier being condemned to twenty years hard labour.

== Assassination of Carlo and Nello Rosselli ==
Carlo Rosselli (1899–1937) was a famous Italian socialist intellectual and activist during the years between World War I and World War II. He devoted his whole life and large amounts of money to the anti-fascist fight against Mussolini, Hitler, and Franco. He and his brother, Nello, were assassinated in Bagnoles-de-l'Orne on June 9, 1937, by a group of "cagoulards", militants of the "Cagoule", a French fascist group, probably on the orders of Mussolini.

== Digital television ==
Lower Normandy, including Bagnoles, was the first region in France, together with Alsace, to change over completely to digital television reception, giving more channels with a higher quality of image and sound to residents. Digital signals were broadcast alongside analogue from December 2009 until March 2010, when the analogue signal was switched off.

== Notable buildings and places ==
Château de la Roche Bagnoles is now the Town hall which features an Arboretum that was created in 1859. It features approximately 168 varieties of Trees

Le Jardin Retiré is a 2500m² garden open to the public specialising in plants that thrive in shade. In 2019 it was labelled as a Jardins remarquables

=== National heritage sites ===
Chalet suédois is a chalet, designed by the architect Hugo Rahm, for the 1889 Exposition Universelle and received a gold medal in class 42 "Proceeds of farms and forestry industries". Put up for sale the day after the exhibition, the building was bought by the industrialist Georges Hartog, then president of the Baths of Bagnoles-de-l'Orne, who made him go up for a resort use. It was classed as Monument historique in 2023

=== Remarkable contemporary architecture ===
The Commune has two buildings labelled as a Architecture contemporaine remarquable

- Église du Sacré-Cœur built in 1934 was labelled as a Architecture contemporaine remarquable in 2004.
- Pavillon des Fleurs shop built in 1927 was labelled as a Architecture contemporaine remarquable in 2007.
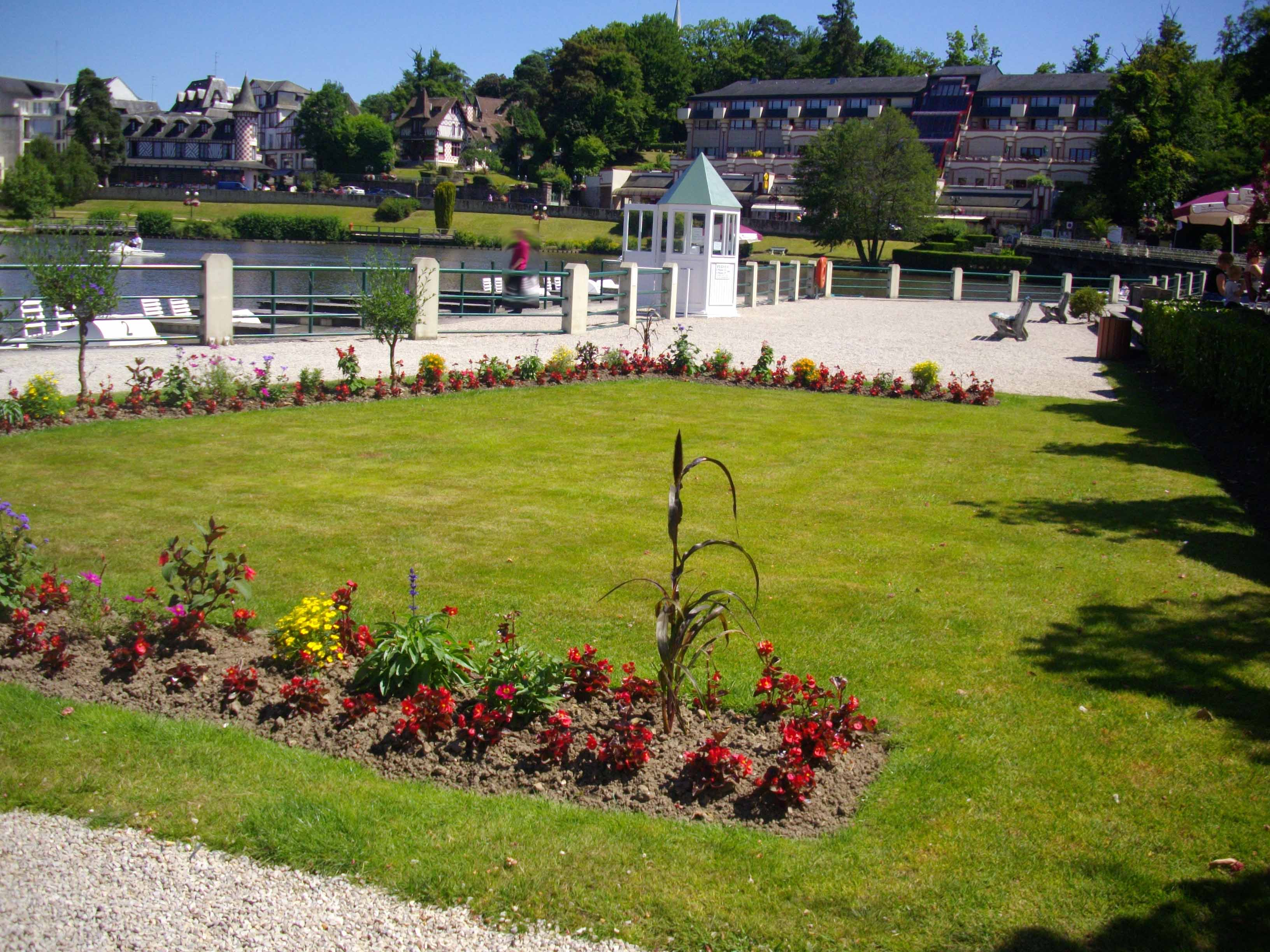
Garden near the lake

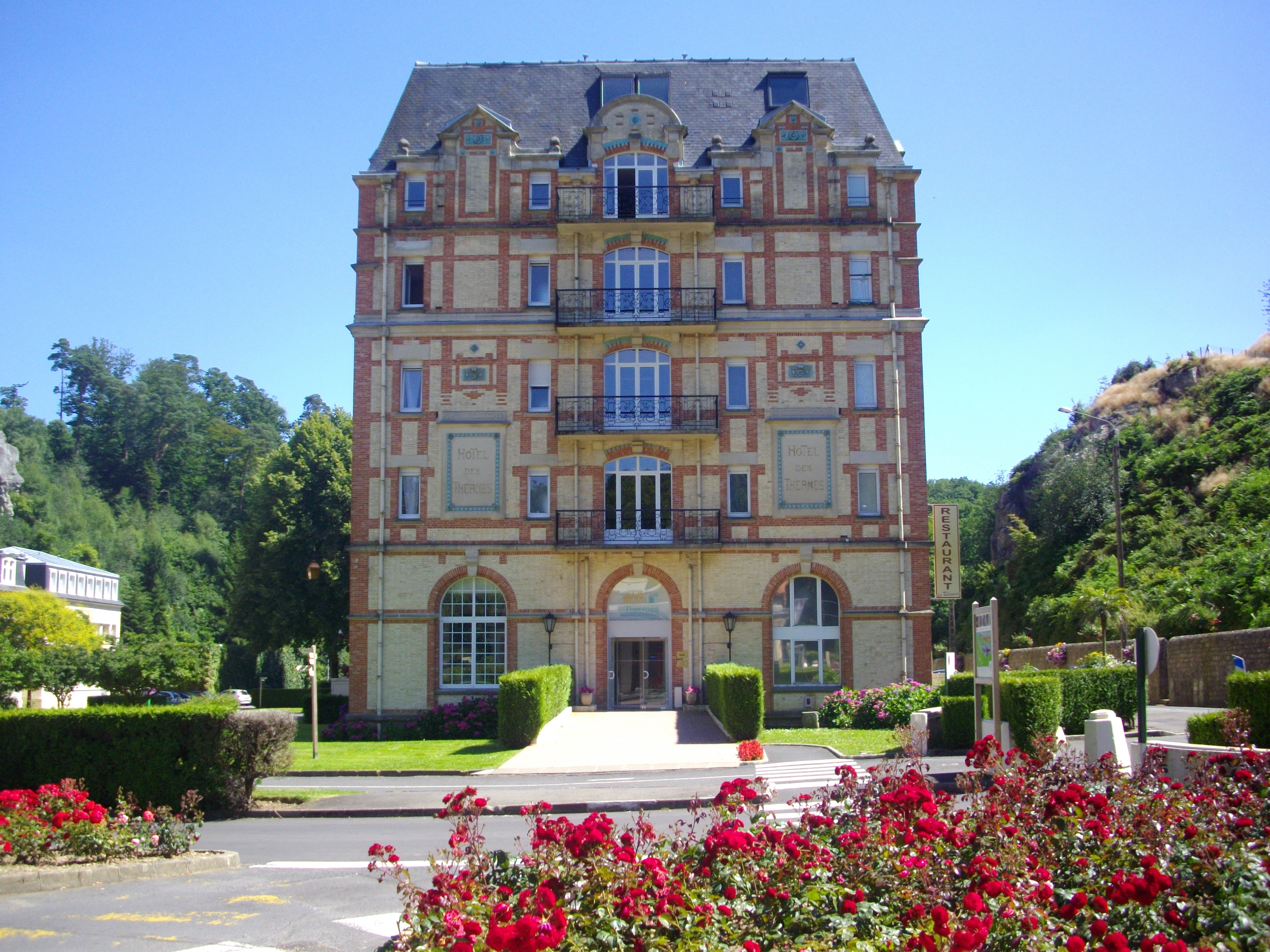
The Hotel des Thermes

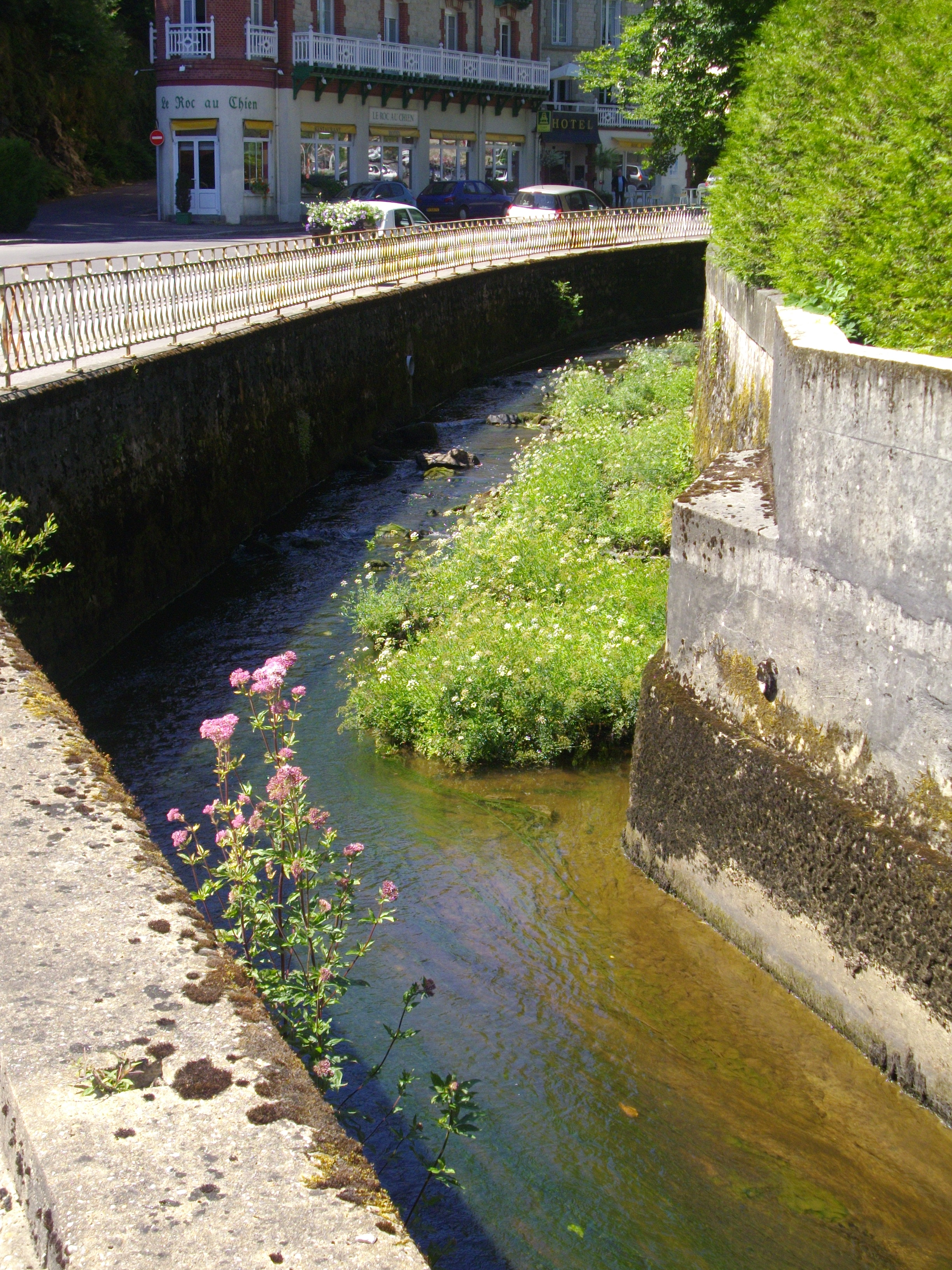
La Vée river

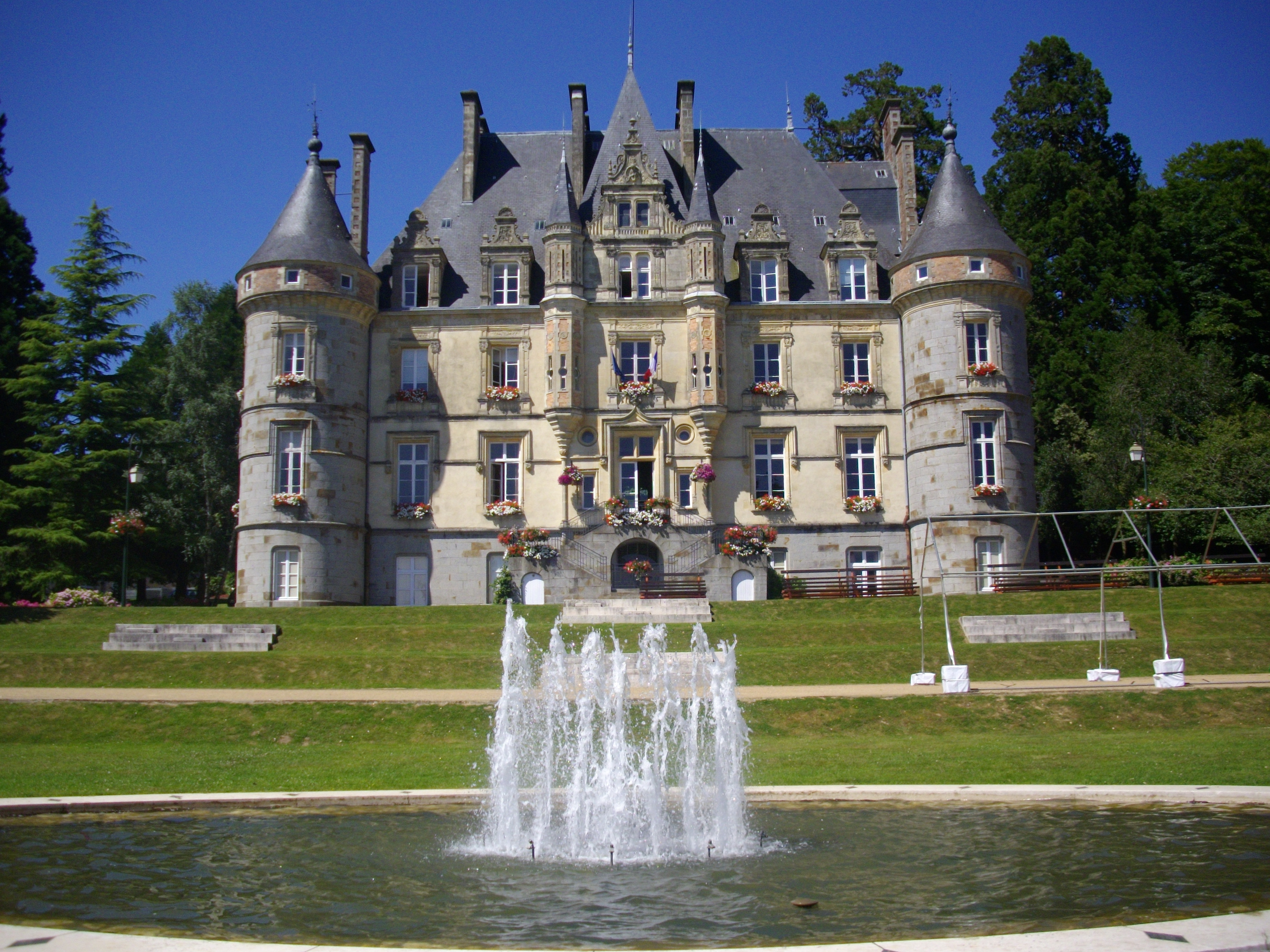
Town Hall - also known as Chateau Goupil

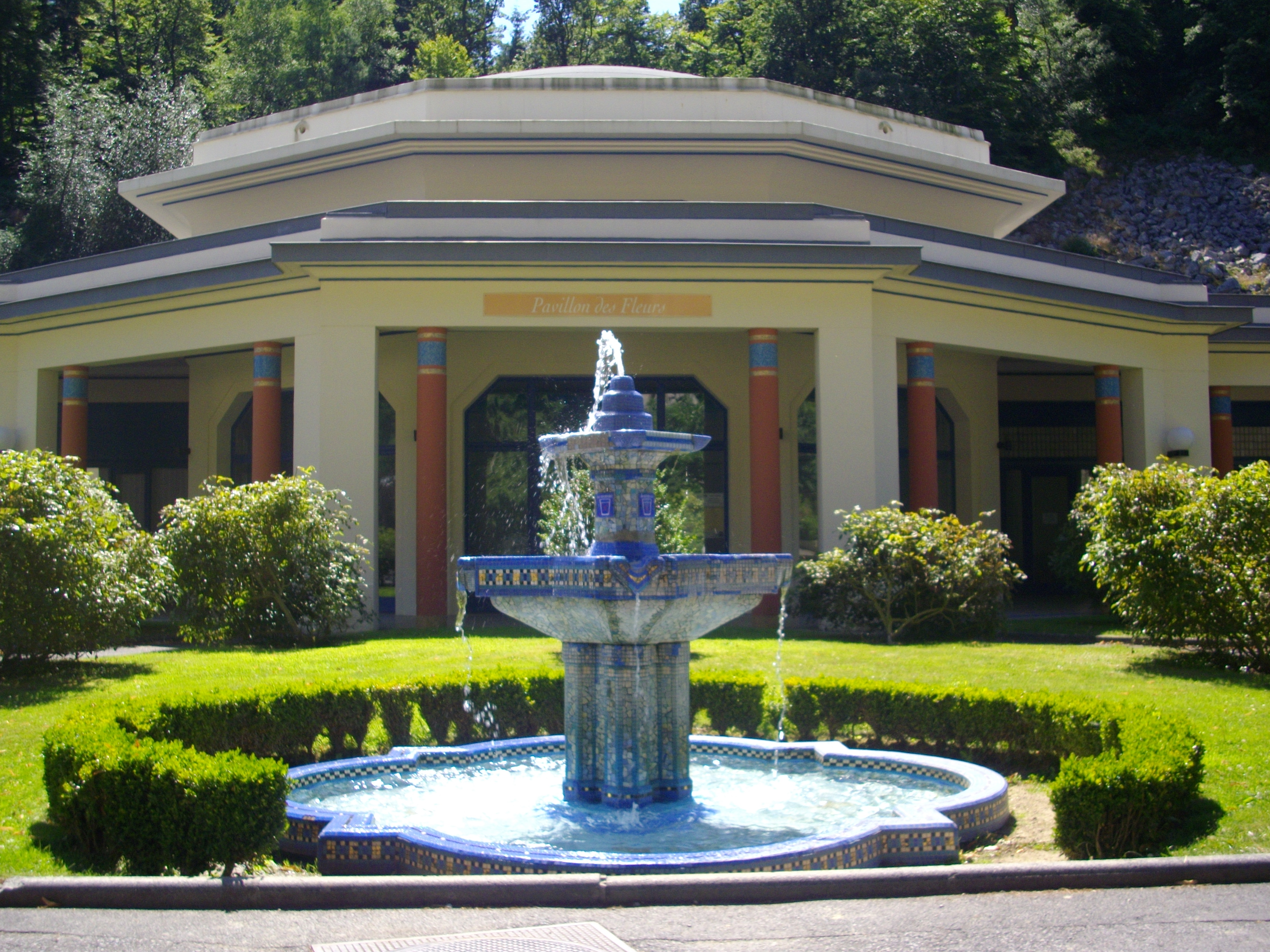
Pavillon des Fleurs

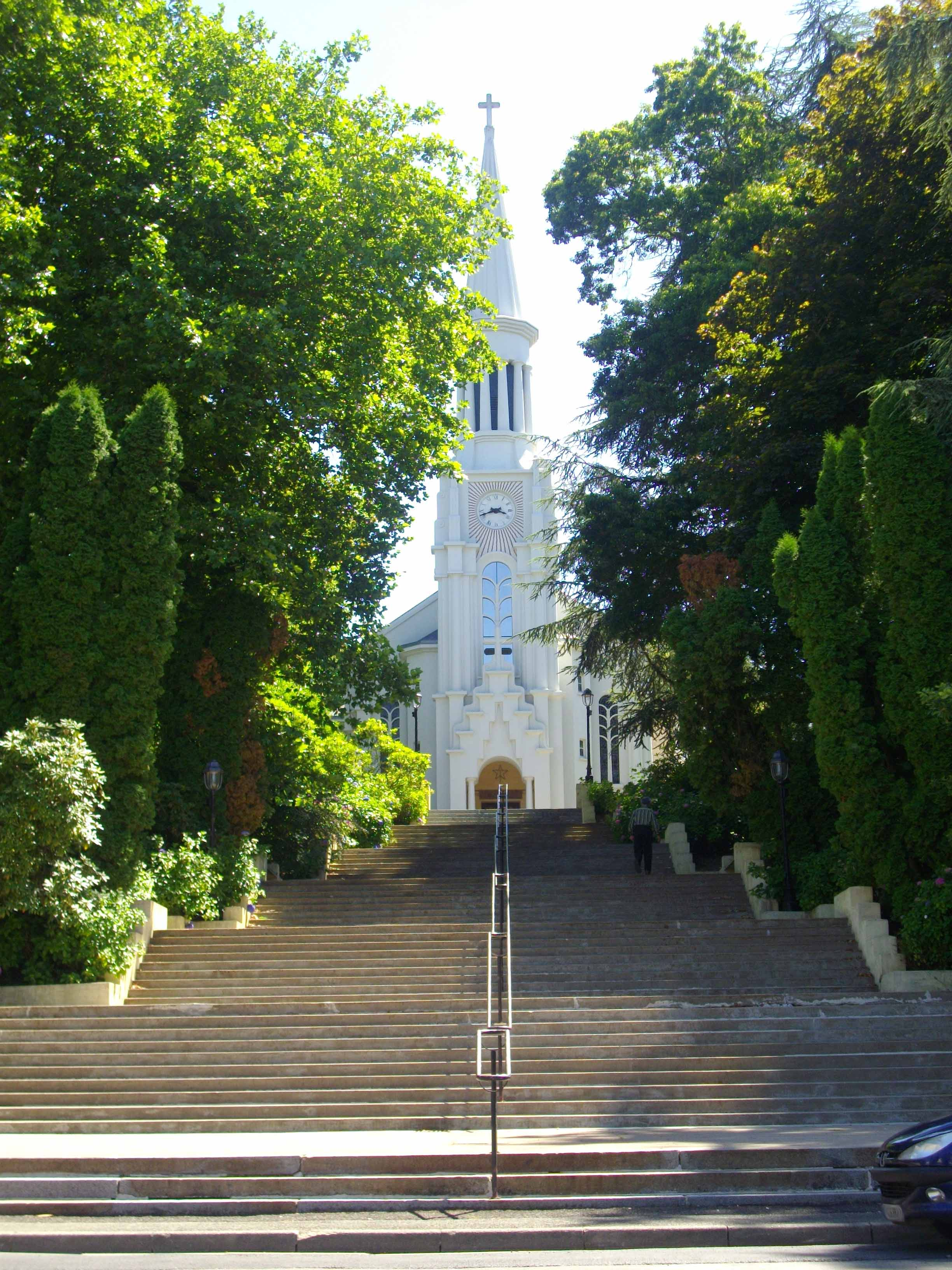
Church Sacré Cœur

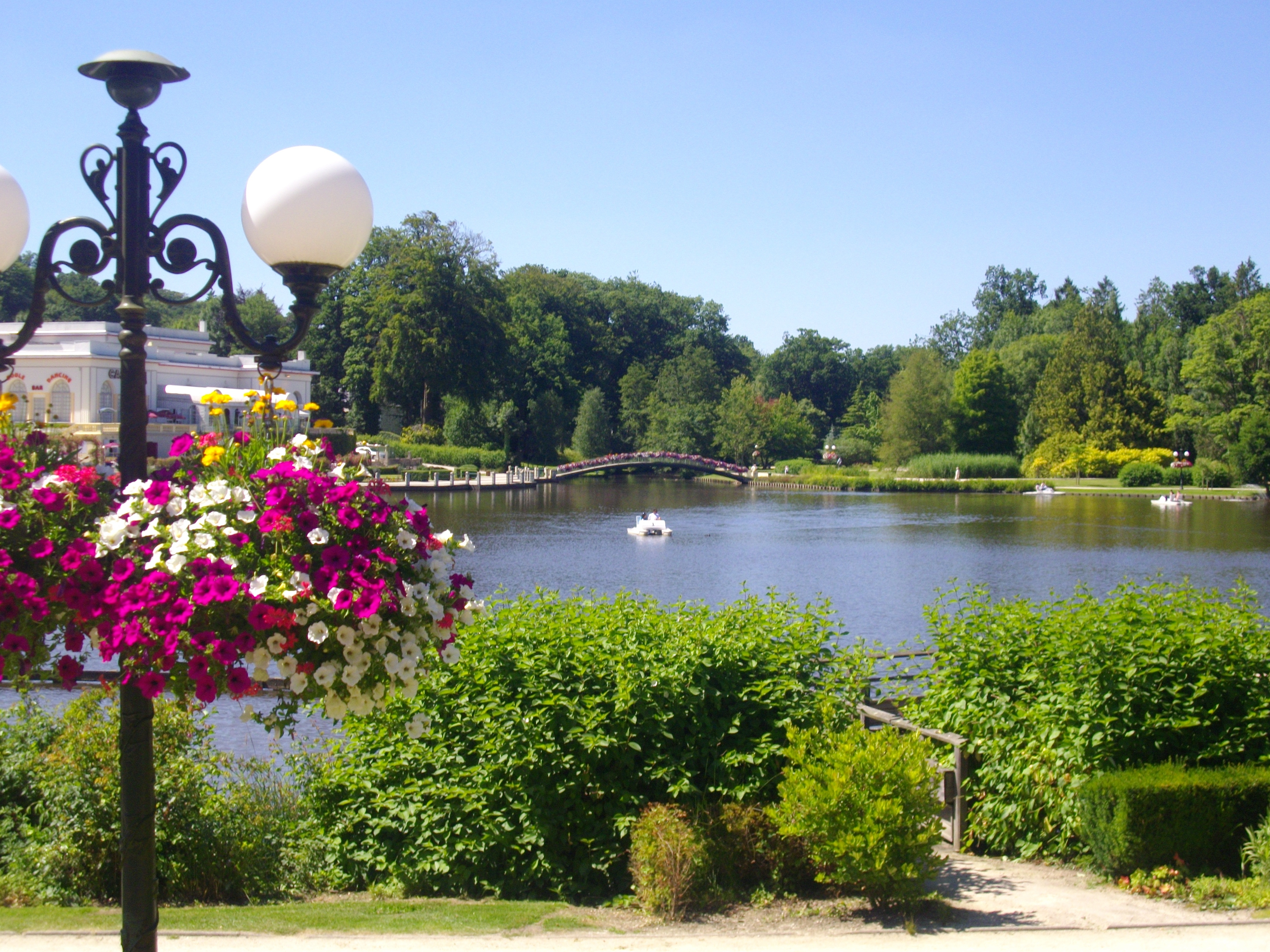
The lake

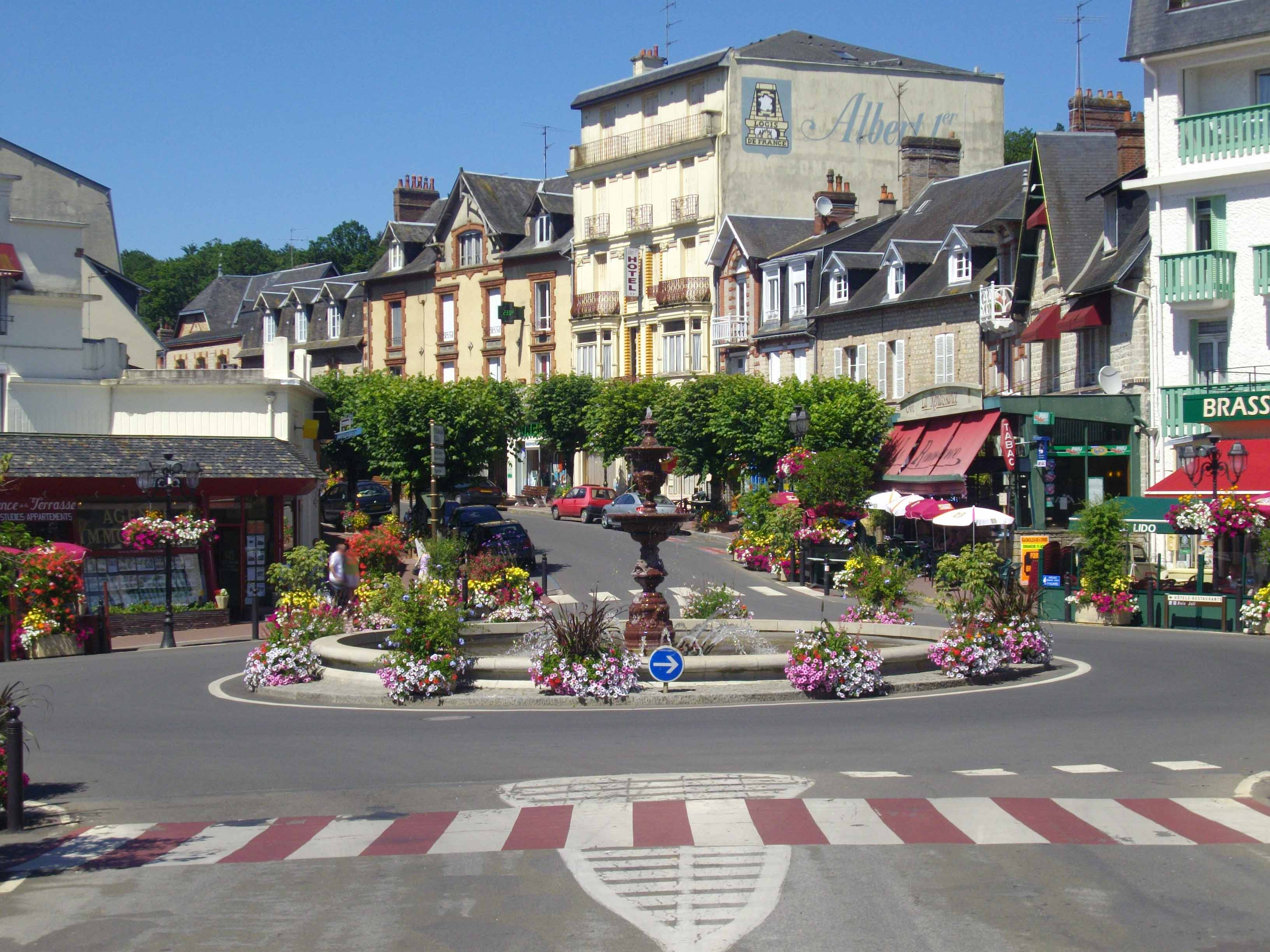
Bagnole de l'Orne

== Sport ==
- Hippodrome de Bagnoles-de-l’Orne - Is a Race course that has three days of racing every July and August.
- Golf d'Andaine is a 9 hole golf course in the commune.

== Notable people ==
- Henry Jean-Baptiste - (1933 – 2018) a French politician who is buried here.
- Tania Balachova - (1902-1973) a French actress and director of Russian origin died here.

== Transport ==
Bagnoles-de-l'Orne station has bus connections to Argentan, Briouze and Flers.

== See also ==
- Communes of the Orne department
- Parc naturel régional Normandie-Maine
