= La Chapelle-d'Andaine =

- Part of Rives d'Andaine
- Location of La Chapelle-d'Andaine
- Location within France Location within Normandy
- Coordinates: 48°32′02″N 0°28′38″W
- Country: France
- Region: Normandy
- Department: Orne
- Arrondissement: Alençon
- Canton: Bagnoles-de-l'Orne
- Commune: Rives d'Andaine
- Area^{1}: 15.50 km^{2} (5.98 sq mi)
- Elevation: 128 m (420 ft)
- Highest elevation: 258 m (846 ft)
- Lowest elevation: 118 m (387 ft)
- Population (2022): 1,406
  - Density: 90.71/km^{2} (234.9/sq mi)
- Time zone: UTC+01:00 (CET)
  - Summer (DST): UTC+02:00 (CEST)
- Postal code: 61140
- ^{1} French Land Register data, which excludes lakes, ponds, glaciers > 1 km^{2} (0.386 sq mi or 247 acres) and river estuaries.

La Chapelle-d'Andaine (French pronunciation: [la ʃapɛl dɑ̃dɛn]) is a former commune in the Orne department in north-western France. On 1 January 2016, it was merged into the new commune of Rives d'Andaine.

== See also ==
- Communes of the Orne department
- Parc naturel régional Normandie-Maine
