= Geneslay =

- Part of Rives d'Andaine
- Location of Geneslay
- Location within France Location within Normandy
- Coordinates: 48°30′42″N 0°28′48″W
- Country: France
- Region: Normandy
- Department: Orne
- Arrondissement: Alençon
- Canton: Bagnoles-de-l'Orne
- Commune: Rives d'Andaine
- Area^{1}: 8.34 km^{2} (3.22 sq mi)
- Elevation: 182 m (597 ft)
- Highest elevation: 146 m (479 ft)
- Lowest elevation: 112 m (367 ft)
- Population (2022): 259
  - Density: 31.1/km^{2} (80.4/sq mi)
- Time zone: UTC+01:00 (CET)
  - Summer (DST): UTC+02:00 (CEST)
- Postal code: 61140
- ^{1} French Land Register data, which excludes lakes, ponds, glaciers > 1 km^{2} (0.386 sq mi or 247 acres) and river estuaries.

Geneslay (French pronunciation: [ʒənɛlɛ]) is a former commune in the Orne department in north-western France. On 1 January 2016, it was merged into the new commune of Rives d'Andaine.

== See also ==
- Communes of the Orne department
- Parc naturel régional Normandie-Maine
