= Couterne =

- Part of Rives d'Andaine
- Location of Couterne
- Location within France Location within Normandy
- Coordinates: 48°30′46″N 0°24′52″W
- Country: France
- Region: Normandy
- Department: Orne
- Arrondissement: Alençon
- Canton: Bagnoles-de-l'Orne
- Commune: Rives d'Andaine
- Area^{1}: 10.68 km^{2} (4.12 sq mi)
- Elevation: 128 m (420 ft)
- Highest elevation: 217 m (712 ft)
- Lowest elevation: 119 m (390 ft)
- Population (2022): 966
  - Density: 90.4/km^{2} (234/sq mi)
- Time zone: UTC+01:00 (CET)
  - Summer (DST): UTC+02:00 (CEST)
- Postal code: 61410
- ^{1} French Land Register data, which excludes lakes, ponds, glaciers > 1 km^{2} (0.386 sq mi or 247 acres) and river estuaries.

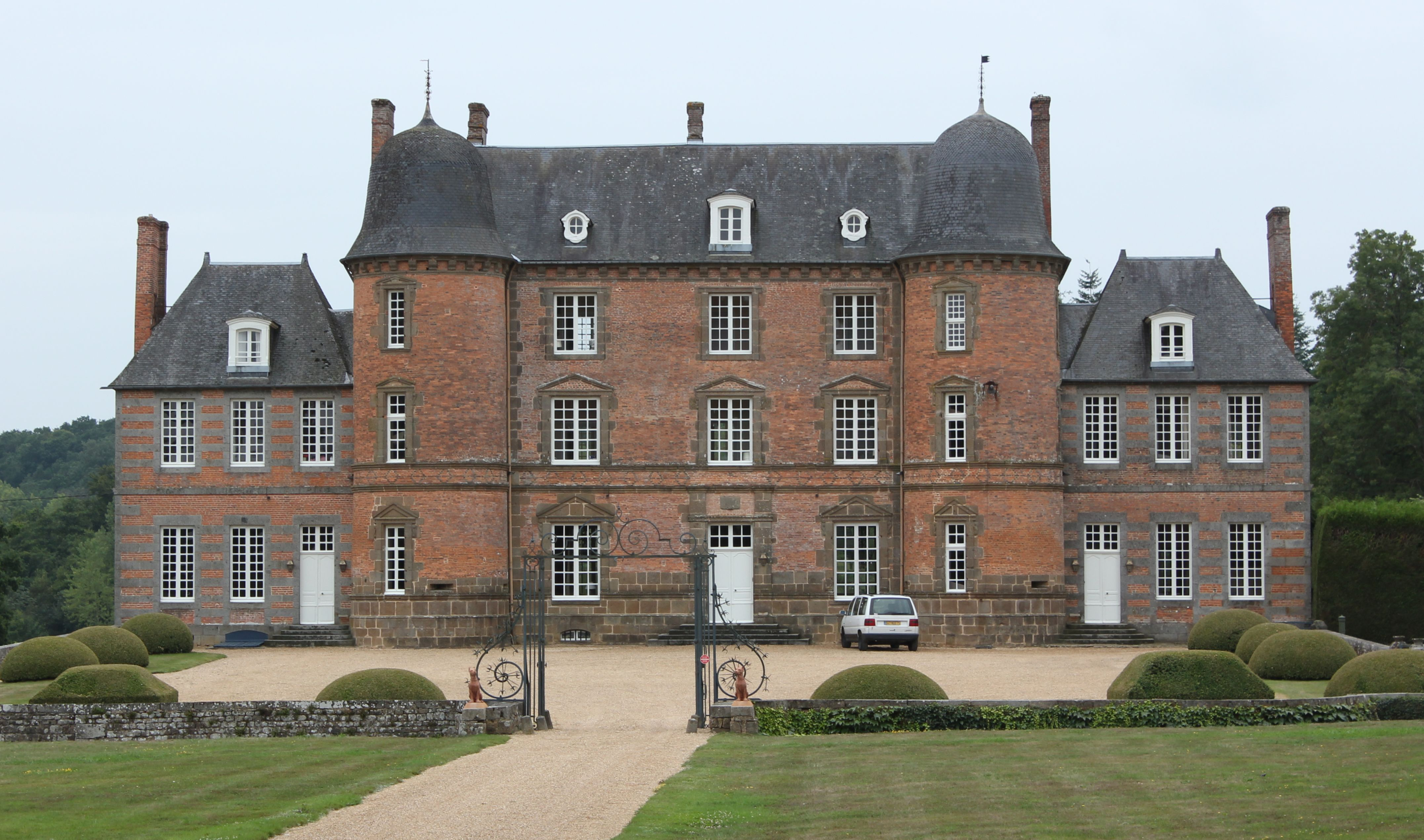
Chateau de Couterne

Couterne (French pronunciation: [kutɛʁn]) is a former commune in the Orne department in north-western France. On 1 January 2016, it was merged into the new commune of Rives d'Andaine.

== See also ==
- Communes of the Orne department
- Parc naturel régional Normandie-Maine
