= Saint-Siméon, Orne =

Saint-Siméon
- Part of Passais Villages
- Location of Saint-Siméon
- Location within France Location within Normandy
- Coordinates: 48°28′07″N 0°44′41″W
- Country: France
- Region: Normandy
- Department: Orne
- Arrondissement: Alençon
- Canton: Bagnoles-de-l'Orne
- Commune: Passais Villages
- Area^{1}: 16.13 km^{2} (6.23 sq mi)
- Elevation: 170 m (560 ft)
- Highest elevation: 212 m (696 ft)
- Lowest elevation: 130 m (430 ft)
- Population (2022): 225
  - Density: 13.9/km^{2} (36.1/sq mi)
- Time zone: UTC+01:00 (CET)
  - Summer (DST): UTC+02:00 (CEST)
- Postal code: 61350
- ^{1} French Land Register data, which excludes lakes, ponds, glaciers > 1 km^{2} (0.386 sq mi or 247 acres) and river estuaries.

Saint-Siméon (French pronunciation: [sɛ̃ simeɔ̃]) is a former commune in the Orne department in north-western France. On 1 January 2016, it was merged into the new commune of Passais Villages.

== See also ==
- Communes of the Orne department
