= Jean Hélion =

French painter (1904–1987)

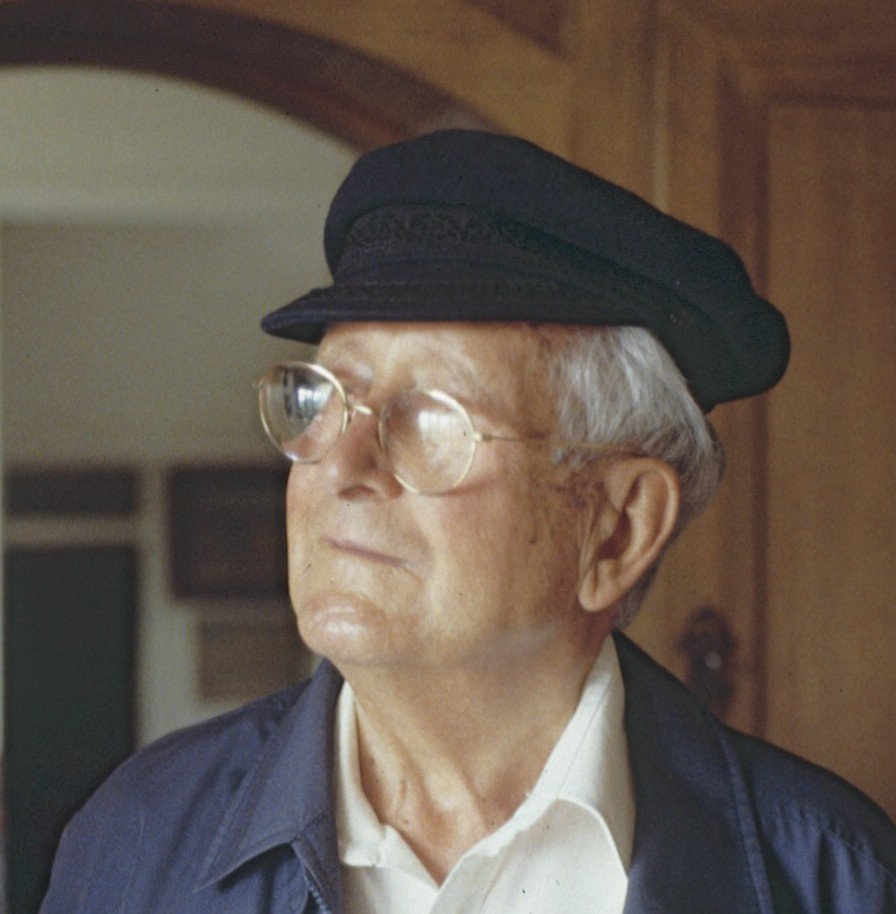
- Born: April 21 1904; Couterne
- Died: October 27, 1987 (aged 83); 14th arrondissement of Paris
- Occupation: Painter
- Years active: 1922–23 to October 1983
- Spouse(s): Pegeen Vail Guggenheim; Jean Blair Helion
- Children: Louis Helion Blair

Jean Hélion (April 21, 1904 – October 27, 1987) was a French painter whose abstract work of the 1930s established him as a leading modernist. His midcareer rejection of abstraction was followed by nearly five decades as a figurative painter. He was also the author of several books and an extensive body of critical writing.

== Early life and training ==
He was born at Couterne, Orne, the son of a taxi driver and a dressmaker. After spending his first eight years with his grandmother, he rejoined his parents in Amiens, where he went to school. Although he experimented with painting pictures on cardboard as a schoolboy, his greater love was poetry. Interested in chemistry as well, Hélion began working as an assistant to a pharmacist in 1918, and set up a laboratory in his bedroom. He later wrote, "...I dreamed and was attracted by shapes and colors which proceeded from the reality of things and were their very essence. My passion for inorganic chemistry arose from my fondness for these shapes, these crystals, these colours, this analysis of a revealed truth." In 1920 he enrolled in the study of chemistry at l'Institut Industriel du Nord in Lille (École centrale de Lille), but left for Paris in 1921 without finishing the course.

In Paris he wrote poetry and worked as an architectural apprentice. He experienced what he called the great turning point of his life while on a research project at the Louvre, where he discovered the works of Nicolas Poussin and Philippe de Champaigne, and decided to become a painter. His first paintings date from 1922–23. In 1925 he abandoned his architectural studies and began attending figure drawing classes at the Académie Adler.

== Career ==
Hélion's early works are similar to manner to Soutine. He met Otto Freundlich in 1925 and later described him as the first abstract painter he had ever met, saying, "At that time I had no idea there was such a thing as abstract art." The next year he was introduced to cubism by the Uruguayan painter Joaquín Torres-García, and in 1928 he exhibited for the first time, showing two paintings at the Salon des Indépendants. His work of this period, mostly still lifes, is close in style to that of Torres-García, with simplified color and bold outlines. In 1930, he joined the group Art Concret and adopted a vocabulary of abstract rectilinear form that derived from the Neoplasticists Piet Mondrian and Theo van Doesburg. During the following years Hélion's art evolved to include curved lines and volumetric forms. He became recognized as a leading abstract painter, as well as an eloquent critic and theoretician whose writings were frequently published in Cahiers d'Art and elsewhere during the 1930s.

Hélion moved to the United States in July 1936, staying in New York and later Rockbridge Baths, Virginia where he built a studio. While he continued painting abstractly, he increasingly felt that his work was tending toward representation, and he began drawing from life. His reading of Baudelaire directed him toward a concept of modernity in which the most ephemeral aspects of contemporary life are reconciled with the timeless and the geometric. He believed that Seurat, who he called "the last great master, and Léger, the greatest after him", especially exemplified this Baudelairian modernism. Hélion's work underwent a radical change—one that would confound his admirers—when he abandoned abstraction decisively in 1939. His first large-scale figurative canvas, With Cyclist (Au cycliste), revealed a simplified and streamlined treatment of form that is related to Léger's style of the 1930s.

In a 1939 letter to Pierre-Georges Bruguière, Hélion revealed his long-range plan:

For ten years I think I shall look, admire and love the life around us—passers-by, houses, gardens, shops, trades and everyday movement. Then, when I have mastered the means and acquired the baggage of characters and attitudes to give me the ease I now have in non-figurative art, I shall begin on a new period, which I have glimpsed in the last few days: I shall give painting back its moral and didactic power. I shall attack great scenes that will no longer be simply descriptive, administrative, but also 'significant', like the great works of Poussin.

In response to the emergency of World War II, Hélion returned to France in 1940 and joined the armed forces. Taken prisoner on June 19, 1940, he was held on a prison ship at Stettin an der Oder (now Szczecin, Poland) until February 13, 1942, when he escaped. Four days later he made his way to Paris; by October he was in America, where he spoke on radio and in lecture halls in support of Free France. His book about his experiences, They Shall Not Have Me, became a best-seller in the United States.

Hélion resumed work in 1943 with a series of depersonalized images of men in hats. Deliberative as always, he painted many close variations on favorite themes, including women at open windows and men reading newspapers. In the following years he developed the cartoon-like aspect of the style he had embraced. A major work of 1947, À rebours (Wrong Way Up), is one of several compositions in which a female nude is represented upside down. In 1949 and 1950 he painted a series of severely awkward, bony female nudes in bare interiors.

In 1951 came another of the abrupt changes that mark his career, as Hélion adapted a naturalistic style. For the next several years he concentrated mostly on figures and still lifes, depicted in a studio setting. His friend Balthus, who had hoped Hélion would "forget Léger", expressed approval of the new works, saying, "For the first time in one of your paintings, one can feel happiness and wonder."

In the 1960s his manner reverted to something closer to his style of the 1940s, but with a new breadth. A chemical sensitivity forced him to abandon oils for acrylics, which he used for the rest of his career. During the next two decades he would paint several large triptychs. His subject matter revealed, as it always had, a preoccupation with sometimes idiosyncratic themes: artists and models, sliced-open squashes, umbrellas, accidental falls, street scenes and street repair.

His eyesight deteriorated in the 1970s. In October 1983 he stopped painting when he became blind as the result of a brain tumor. By dictation, he wrote three final books on art. In one of them, Mémoire de la chambre jaune (published posthumously in 1994), he attested to having "sought out the voice of painting wherever it sings loudest. No doubt, in complete abstraction one has the feeling of a great shock, if not an explosion, and in approaching the real, one feels health and truth restored. The whole import of the successive periods of my work was to combine the two."

Jean Hélion died in Paris on October 27, 1987.

== Personal ==
Hélion was married four times; his third wife was Pegeen Vail Guggenheim, the daughter of Peggy Guggenheim. Helion's marriage to Jean Blair Helion produced a son, Louis Helion Blair, who was a distinguished public official, professor, and longtime Executive Secretary of the Harry S. Truman Scholarship Foundation. Helion left Jean Blair Helion and his young son to return to France, apparently in response to the French declaration of war against Nazi Germany.

== Legacy ==
While Hélion's abstract paintings of the 1930s have always been well regarded, his subsequent stylistic changes took him far from the modern mainstream, and were regarded in some quarters as apostasy, although in recent years there has been a reevaluation. Artists who have acknowledged the influence of Hélion include Roy Lichtenstein, Nell Blaine, and Leland Bell.

Hélion's work is in many French museums, as well as the Museum of Modern Art in New York, the Art Institute of Chicago, the Albright-Knox Art Gallery in Buffalo, New York, the North Carolina Museum of Art, the Kunsthalle Hamburg, and the Tate Gallery, London.

Most of the artist's notebooks are preserved in the Bibliothèque Nationale in Paris.
