= Saint-Michel-des-Andaines =

- Part of Bagnoles-de-l'Orne-Normandie
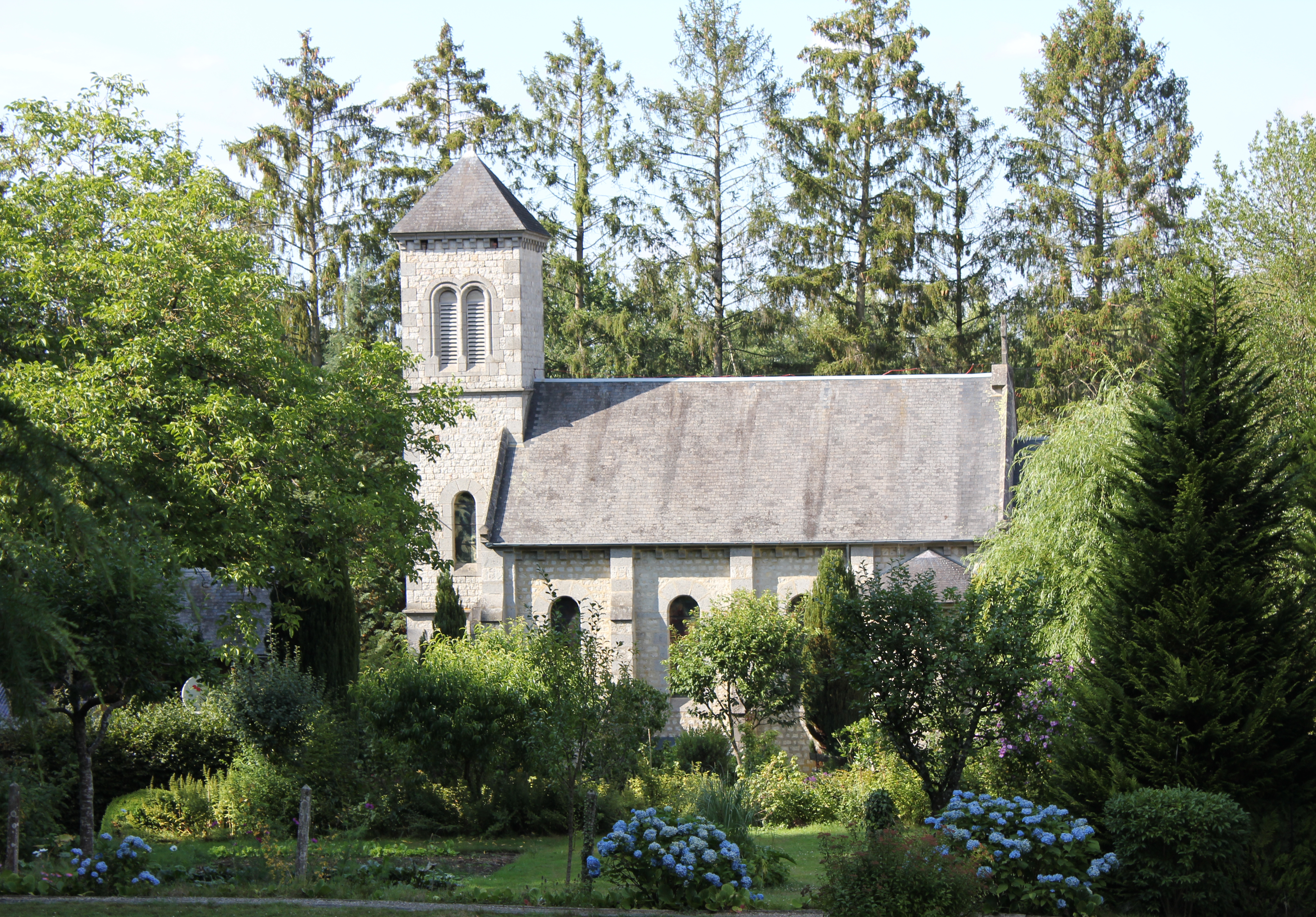
- Saint Ortaire priory
- Location of Saint-Michel-des-Andaines
- Location within France Location within Normandy
- Coordinates: 48°34′51″N 0°24′52″W
- Country: France
- Region: Normandy
- Department: Orne
- Arrondissement: Alençon
- Canton: La Ferté-Macé
- Commune: Bagnoles-de-l'Orne-Normandie
- Area^{1}: 6.44 km^{2} (2.49 sq mi)
- Elevation: 194 m (636 ft)
- Highest elevation: 253 m (830 ft)
- Lowest elevation: 185 m (607 ft)
- Population (2022): 313
  - Density: 48.6/km^{2} (126/sq mi)
- Time zone: UTC+01:00 (CET)
  - Summer (DST): UTC+02:00 (CEST)
- Postal code: 61600
- ^{1} French Land Register data, which excludes lakes, ponds, glaciers > 1 km^{2} (0.386 sq mi or 247 acres) and river estuaries.

Saint-Michel-des-Andaines is a former commune in the Orne department in north-western France. On 1 January 2016, it was merged into the new commune of Bagnoles-de-l'Orne-Normandie.

== See also ==
- Communes of the Orne department
- Parc naturel régional Normandie-Maine
