= Torchamp =

- Commune
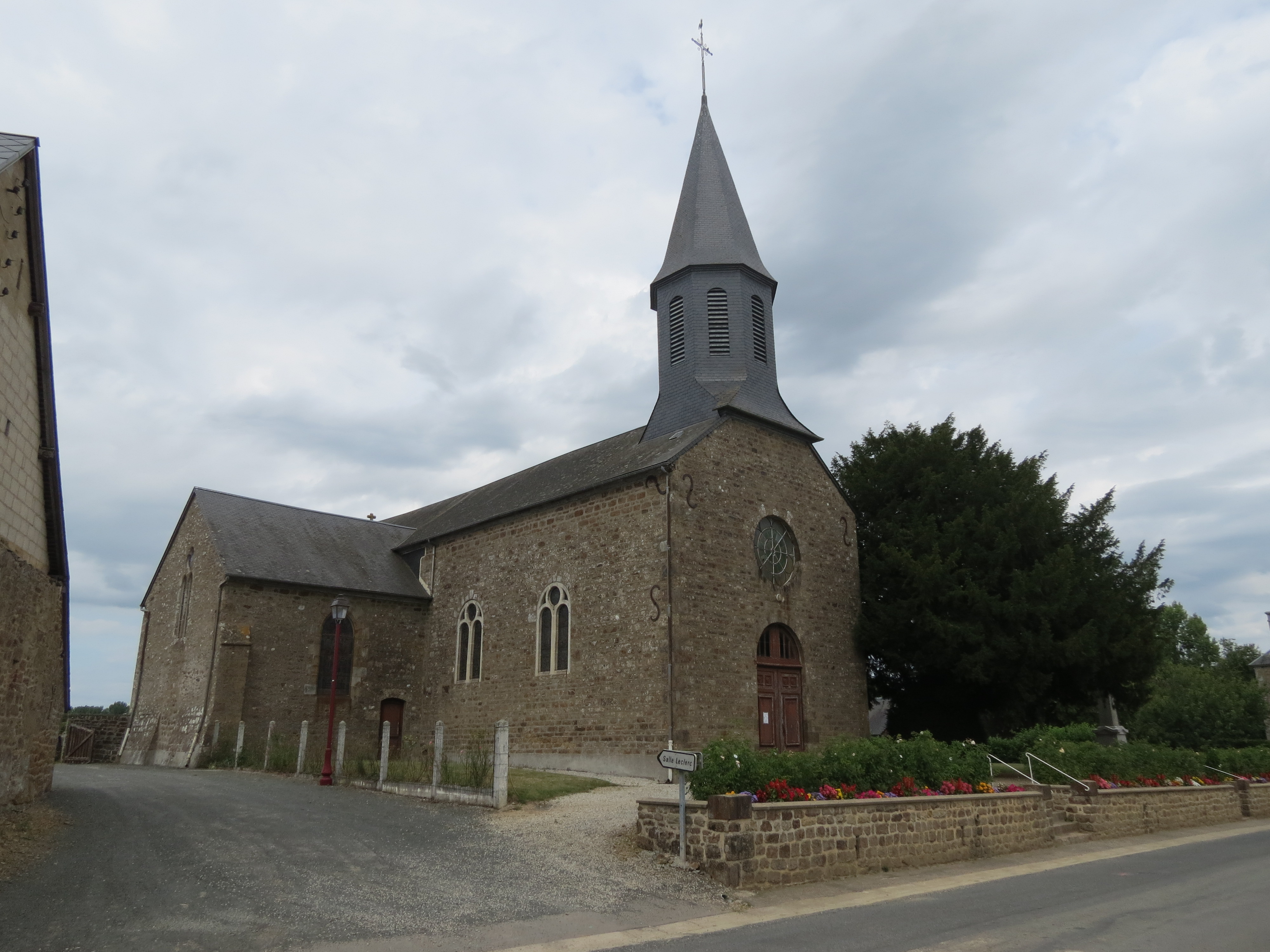
- The church in Torchamp
- Location of Torchamp
- Location within France Location within Normandy
- Coordinates: 48°32′50″N 0°41′47″W
- Country: France
- Region: Normandy
- Department: Orne
- Arrondissement: Alençon
- Canton: Bagnoles de l'Orne Normandie
- Intercommunality: Andaine-Passais

Government
  - Mayor (2022–2026): Didier Launay
- Area^{1}: 14.69 km^{2} (5.67 sq mi)
- Elevation: 150 m (490 ft)
- Highest elevation: 262 m (860 ft)
- Lowest elevation: 111 m (364 ft)
- Population (2023): 291
  - Density: 19.8/km^{2} (51.3/sq mi)
- Time zone: UTC+01:00 (CET)
  - Summer (DST): UTC+02:00 (CEST)
- INSEE/Postal code: 61487 /61330
- ^{1} French Land Register data, which excludes lakes, ponds, glaciers > 1 km^{2} (0.386 sq mi or 247 acres) and river estuaries.

Torchamp (French pronunciation: [tɔʁʃɑ̃]) is a commune in the Orne department in north-western France.

== Geography ==
The commune is in the Normandie-Maine Regional Natural Park.

The river Varenne flows through the commune.

== Points of interest ==
=== National heritage sites ===
- Château de Torchamp an eighteenth century chateau, it and surrounding buildings were registered as a Monument historique in 1974.

== See also ==
- Communes of the Orne department
- Parc naturel régional Normandie-Maine
