= Rives d'Andaine =

- Commune
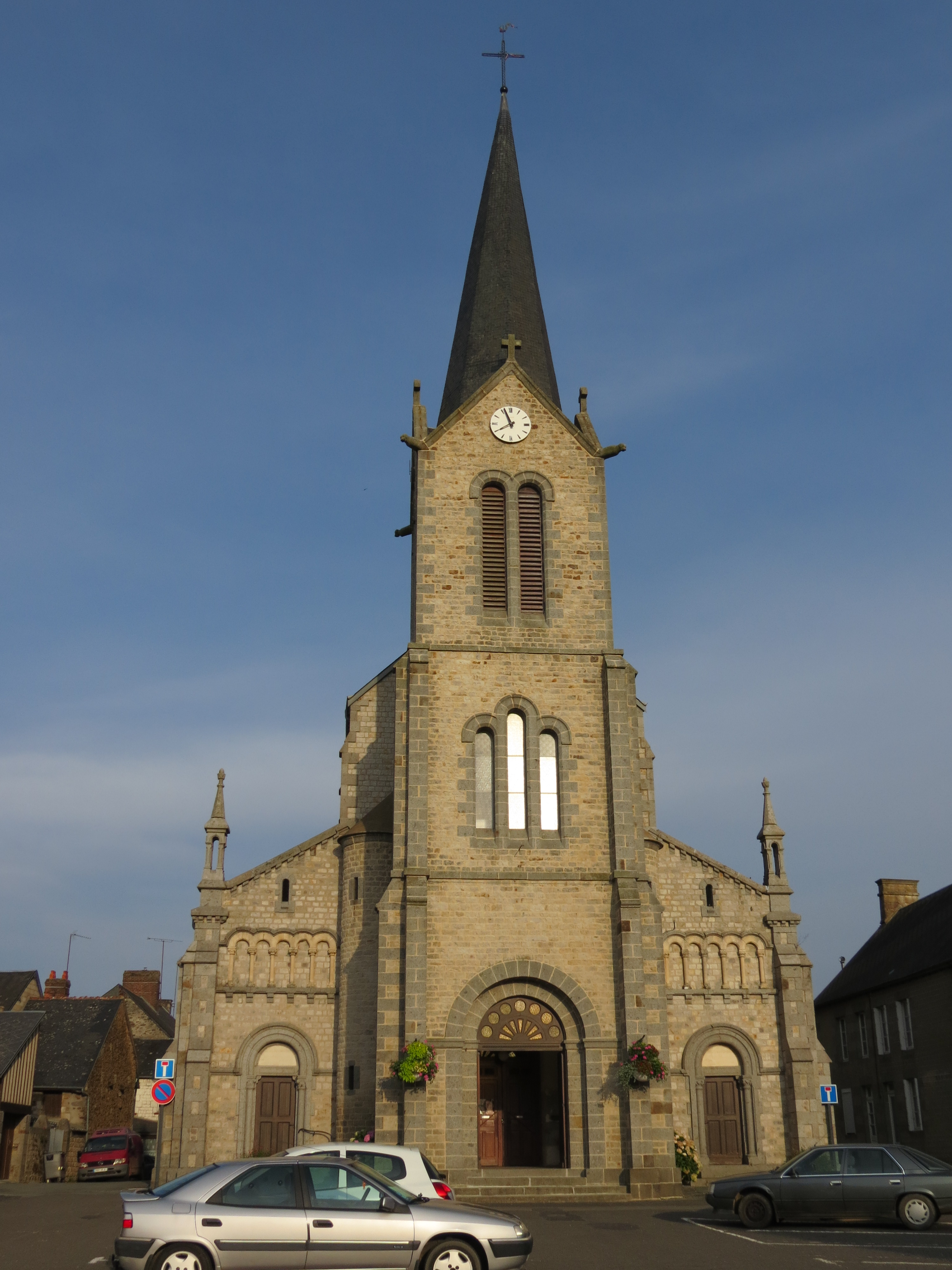
- The church in La Chapelle d'Andaine
- Location of Rives d'Andaine
- Location within France Location within Normandy
- Coordinates: 48°31′59″N 0°28′48″W
- Country: France
- Region: Normandy
- Department: Orne
- Arrondissement: Alençon
- Canton: Bagnoles de l'Orne Normandie

Government
  - Mayor (2020–2026): Philippe Turcan
- Area^{1}: 37.14 km^{2} (14.34 sq mi)
- Population (2023): 2,844
  - Density: 76.58/km^{2} (198.3/sq mi)
- Time zone: UTC+01:00 (CET)
  - Summer (DST): UTC+02:00 (CEST)
- INSEE/Postal code: 61096 /61140, 61410
- ^{1} French Land Register data, which excludes lakes, ponds, glaciers > 1 km^{2} (0.386 sq mi or 247 acres) and river estuaries.

Rives d'Andaine (French pronunciation: [ʁiv dɑ̃dɛn]) is a commune in the department of Orne, northwestern France. The municipality was established on 1 January 2016 by merger of the former communes of La Chapelle-d'Andaine (the seat), Couterne, Geneslay and Haleine.

== Geography ==
The commune is made up of the following collection of villages and hamlets, Le Haut Coudray, La Petite Houssaye, La Hubaudière, La Frogerie, La Saucère, La Chapelle-d'Andaine, La Minerie, Le Petit Fay, Le Moulin Guérin, Le Bois Nardoux, Haleine and Geneslay.

The Mayenne river flows through the commune.

The commune is located within the Normandie-Maine Regional Natural Park.

== Population ==
Population data refer to the area corresponding with the commune as of January 2025.

Historical population
| Year | Pop. | ±% p.a. |
|---|---|---|
| 1968 | 2,927 | — |
| 1975 | 2,981 | +0.26% |
| 1982 | 2,903 | −0.38% |
| 1990 | 3,049 | +0.62% |
| 1999 | 3,047 | −0.01% |
| 2007 | 3,112 | +0.26% |
| 2012 | 3,084 | −0.18% |
| 2017 | 3,054 | −0.20% |
| 2023 | 2,844 | −1.18% |
Source: INSEE

== points of interest ==
=== Museums ===
- Aéro-Mémoire 39-45 - A museum dedicated to aeronautical heritage from 1939 to 1945, including, pilot memoirs, parts and remains of aircraft found in the region since 1944. The museum is based in an old flour mill, with around 280 square meters of displays, and has been open to the public since 2014.

=== National heritage sites ===
The Commune has two buildings and areas listed as a Monument historique.

- Couterne flour mill built in the early 20th century this ex flour mill, now warehouse, was registered as a monument in 1995.
- Le château de Couterne 16th century Chateau, that has belonged to the same family since it was built, it was registered as a Monument historique in 1931.

== Transport ==
- Couterne Airport also known as L'aérodrome de Bagnoles-de-l'Orne is an Aerodrome within the commune that was opened in 1965. Its ICAO airport code is LFAO. It has a hard runway of 1060 metres and a second grass runway of 1000m.

== Notable people ==
- Jean Hélion - (1904 - 1987) a painter who was born here in Couterne.

== See also ==
- Communes of the Orne department
