= Henry Jean-Baptiste =

French politician

- Born: Henry Guy Jean-Baptiste; January 3, 1933; Fort-de-France
- Died: January 5, 2018 (aged 85); 16th arrondissement of Paris
- Resting place: Bagnoles-de-l'Orne
- Occupations: civil servant and politician
- Political party: Union for French Democracy

Henry-Jean Baptiste (3 January 1933 in Fort-de-France, Martinique – 5 January 2018 in Paris) was a French politician from Martinique who was elected and represented Mayotte in the French National Assembly from 1986 to 2002.
