= Passais =

Commune in Orne, France

- Part of Passais Villages
- Location of Passais
- Location within France Location within Normandy
- Coordinates: 48°31′10″N 0°45′23″W
- Country: France
- Region: Normandy
- Department: Orne
- Arrondissement: Alençon
- Canton: Bagnoles-de-l'Orne
- Commune: Passais Villages
- Area^{1}: 16.68 km^{2} (6.44 sq mi)
- Elevation: 150 m (490 ft)
- Highest elevation: 207 m (679 ft)
- Lowest elevation: 143 m (469 ft)
- Population (2022): 769
  - Density: 46.1/km^{2} (119/sq mi)
- Time zone: UTC+01:00 (CET)
  - Summer (DST): UTC+02:00 (CEST)
- Postal code: 61350
- ^{1} French Land Register data, which excludes lakes, ponds, glaciers > 1 km^{2} (0.386 sq mi or 247 acres) and river estuaries.

Passais (French pronunciation: [pasɛ]; also: Passais-la-Conception) is a former commune in the Orne department in north-western France. On 1 January 2016, it was merged into the new commune of Passais Villages.

Facilities in the village include a doctors’ surgery (with nurses), a pharmacy, a boulangerie, two hairdressers, a Tabac, two banks, a boucherie, and a bar / restaurant. There is also soon to open a new clothing business, Desirabilitees, which specializes in printed T shirts and workwear.

There is also a médiathèque (library), a theatre, a Marie, a salles des fêtes, and schools.

Petrol and diesel is available from a 24-hour commune filling station, which is alongside a Vehicle workshop (Top Garage).

There is a small market on a Tuesday morning.

== See also ==
- Communes of the Orne department
