= Julien Alexandre Achard de Bonvouloir =

French envoy (1749–1783)

- Born: May 10, 1749; Passais
- Died: 1783 (aged 33–34); India
- Occupation: Diplomat

Julien Alexandre Achard de Bonvouloir (10 May 1749, in Passais-la-Conception – 1783) was a secret French envoy to the American colonies, in 1775.

Julien Alexandre Achard de Bonvouloir's ancient family from Poitou and Normandy was divided into three branches: Achard de Bonvouloir, Achard de la Vente, and Achard de Leluardière. The eldest Achard was granted the right to lead the Bishop of Angoulême in saving the city from the infidels. Achard also fought the Saracens; a cross commemorating this battle stands at the site of the battle, bearing the inscription: "Achard, the Tison, the neighbor across the country has driven off the Saracens.

== Bibliography ==
- Joseph Hamon, Le chevalier de Bonvouloir: premier émissaire secret de la France auprès du Congrès de Philadelphie avant l'indépendance américaine, Jouve, 1953, 117 p.
