= L'Épinay-le-Comte =

- Part of Passais Villages
- Location of L'Épinay-le-Comte
- Location within France Location within Normandy
- Coordinates: 48°28′19″N 0°48′35″W
- Country: France
- Region: Normandy
- Department: Orne
- Arrondissement: Alençon
- Canton: Bagnoles-de-l'Orne
- Commune: Passais Villages
- Area^{1}: 9.55 km^{2} (3.69 sq mi)
- Elevation: 180 m (590 ft)
- Highest elevation: 217 m (712 ft)
- Lowest elevation: 157 m (515 ft)
- Population (2022): 165
  - Density: 17.3/km^{2} (44.7/sq mi)
- Time zone: UTC+01:00 (CET)
  - Summer (DST): UTC+02:00 (CEST)
- Postal code: 61350
- ^{1} French Land Register data, which excludes lakes, ponds, glaciers > 1 km^{2} (0.386 sq mi or 247 acres) and river estuaries.

L'Épinay-le-Comte (French pronunciation: [lepinɛ lə kɔ̃t]) is a former commune in the Orne department in north-western France. On 1 January 2016, it was merged into the new commune of Passais Villages.

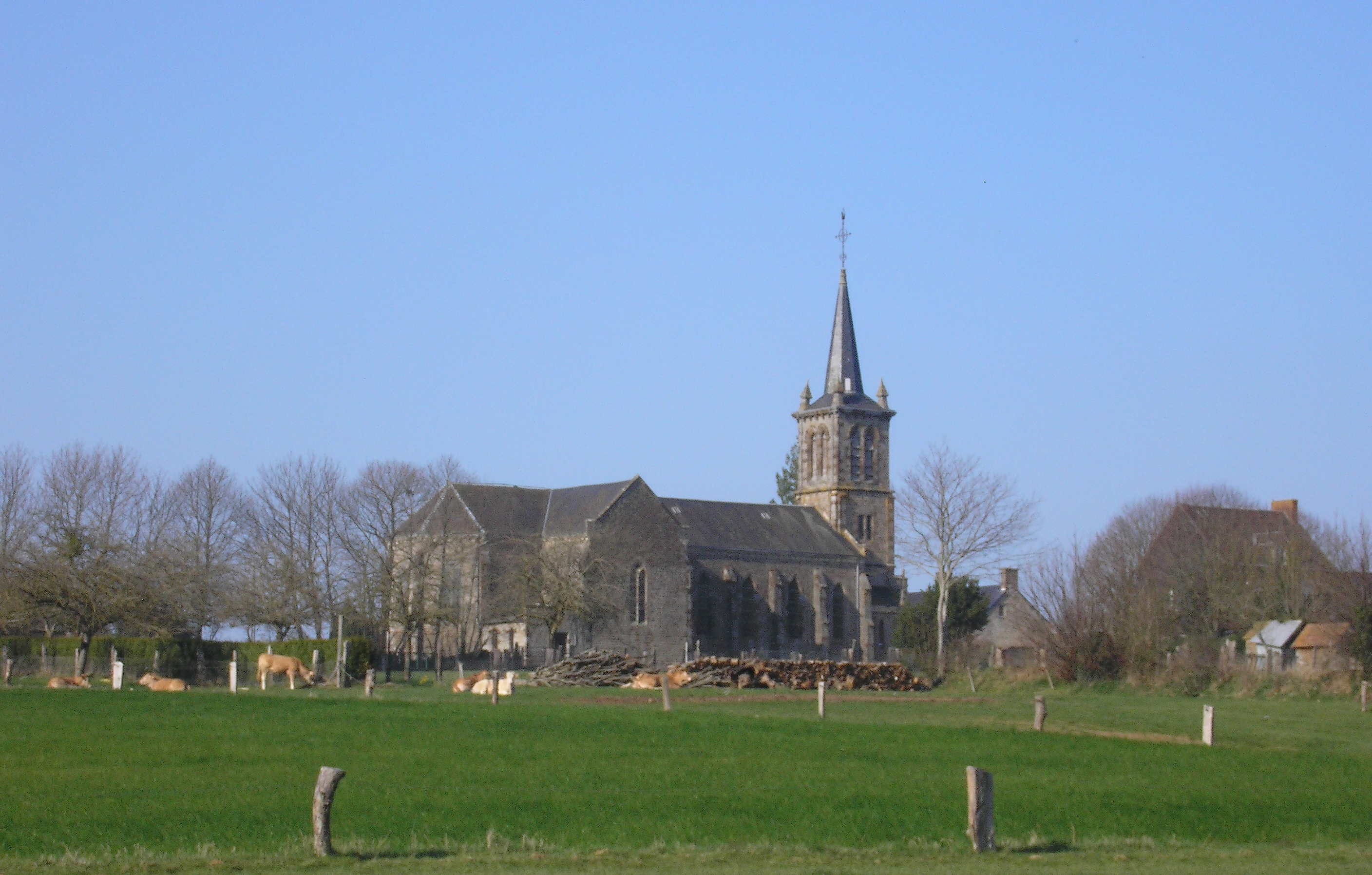
L'église Saint-Céneri

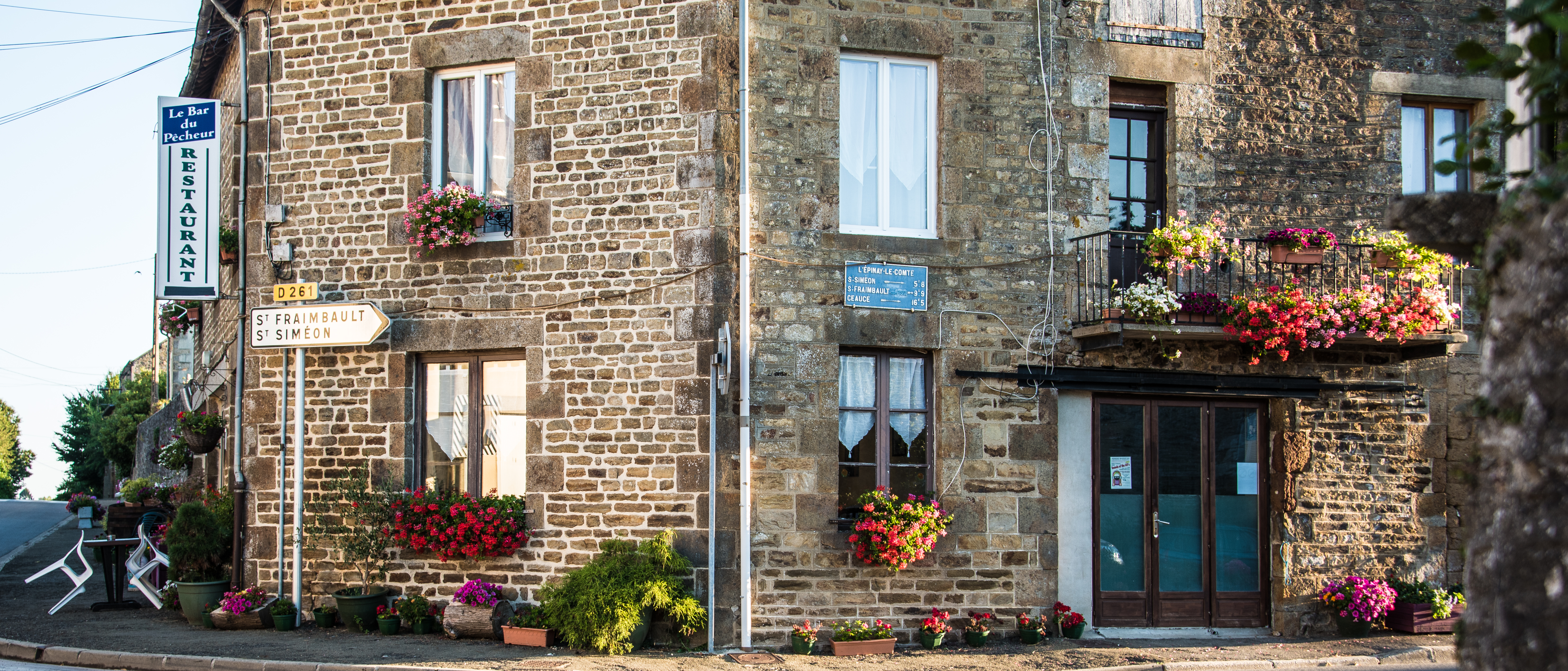
The bar in the village

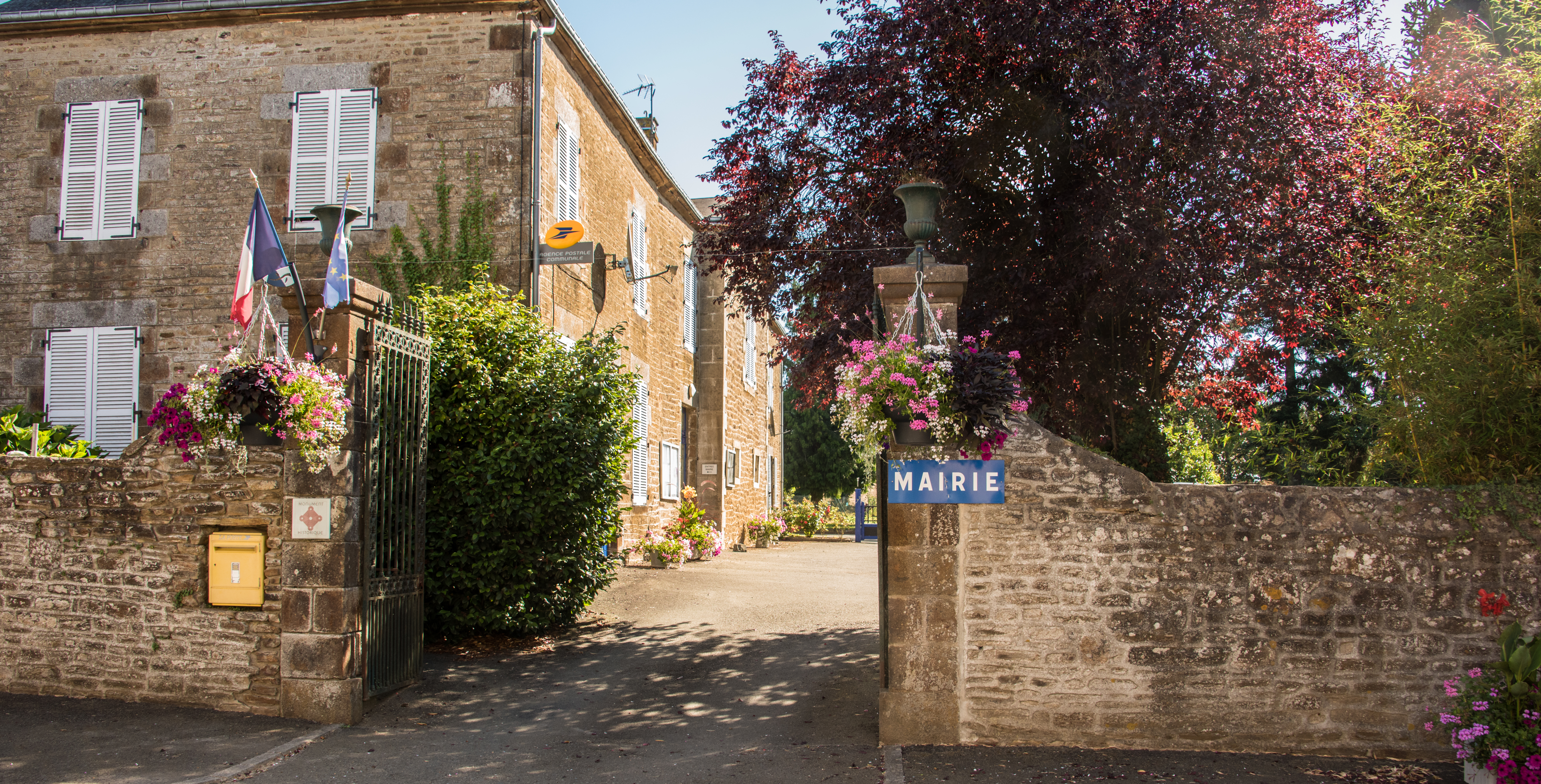
L'Epinay-le-Comte Marie

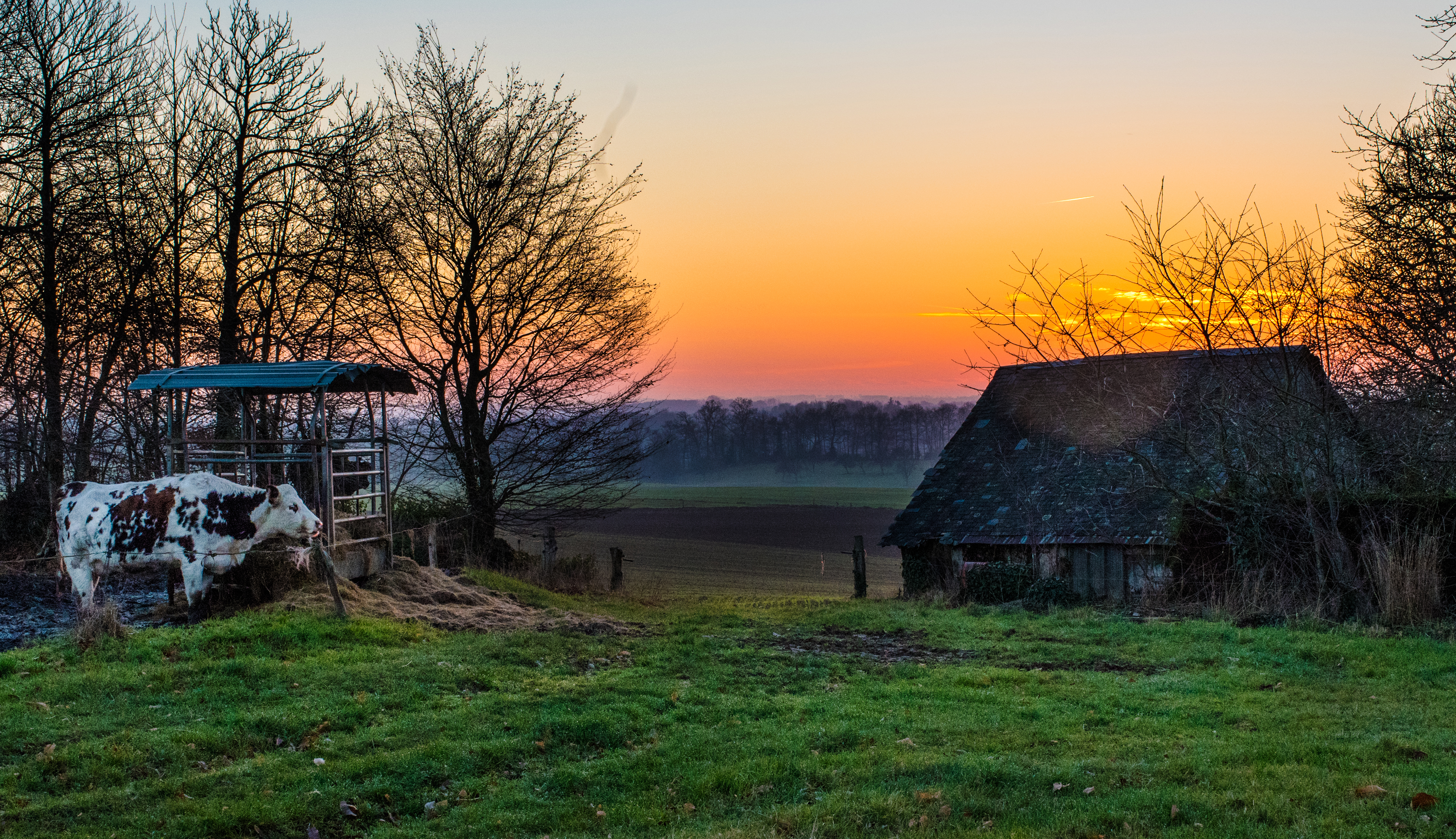
View in the general direction of L'Epinay-le-Comte from La Boe

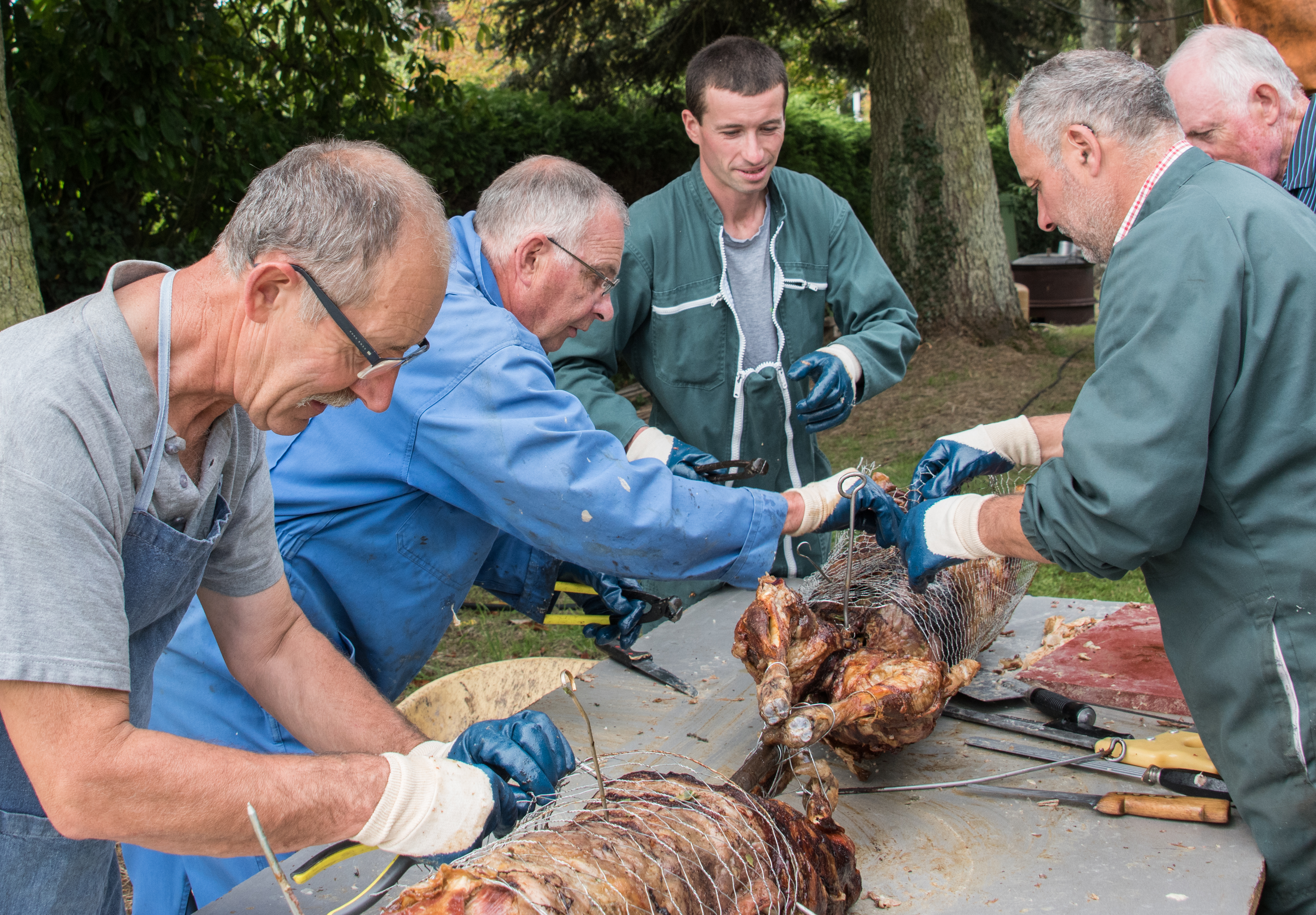
Preparing the roast: 2017 méchoui

Facilities in the village include the mairie, a salles des fêtes, and a bar / restaurant.

== See also ==
- Communes of the Orne department
