= Bagnoles de l'Orne Normandie =

- Commune
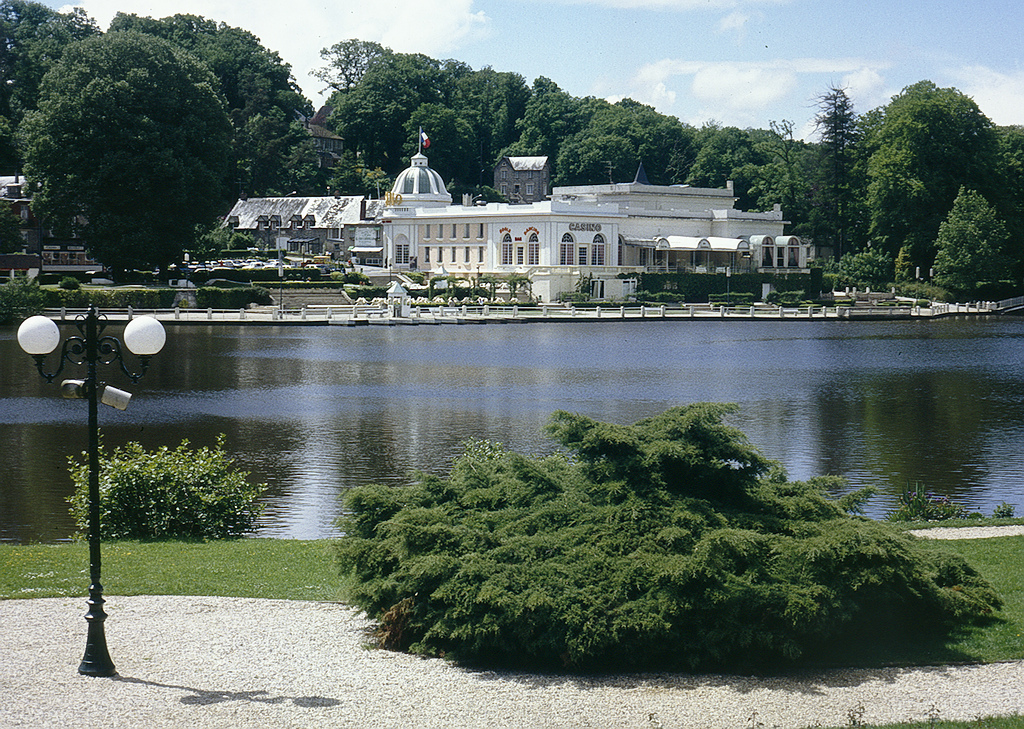
- The lake and casino in Bagnoles-de-l'Orne
- Location of Bagnoles de l'Orne Normandie
- Location within France Location within Normandy
- Coordinates: 48°33′11″N 0°25′19″W
- Country: France
- Region: Normandy
- Department: Orne
- Arrondissement: Alençon
- Canton: Bagnoles de l'Orne Normandie
- Area^{1}: 15.70 km^{2} (6.06 sq mi)
- Population (2023): 2,699
  - Density: 171.9/km^{2} (445.2/sq mi)
- Time zone: UTC+01:00 (CET)
  - Summer (DST): UTC+02:00 (CEST)
- INSEE/Postal code: 61483 /61140, 61600
- ^{1} French Land Register data, which excludes lakes, ponds, glaciers > 1 km^{2} (0.386 sq mi or 247 acres) and river estuaries.

Bagnoles de l'Orne Normandie is a commune in the department of Orne, northwestern France. The municipality was established on 1 January 2016 by merger of the former communes of Bagnoles-de-l'Orne (the seat) and Saint-Michel-des-Andaines.

== Geography ==
The commune is made up of the following collection of villages and hamlets, L'Être au Gras, Saint-Michel-des-Andaines, Javains and Bagnoles de l'Orne Normandie.

It is 1,570 hectares (6.1 sq mi) in size. The highest point in the commune is 205 metres (673 ft).

The commune is within the Normandie-Maine Regional Natural Park.

The Vee river, is the major watercourse running through this area.

== Population ==
Population data refer to the area corresponding with the commune as of January 2025.

Historical population
Year	Pop.	±% p.a.
1968	1,754	—
1975	1,714	−0.33%
1982	1,993	+2.18%
1990	2,279	+1.69%
1999	2,499	+1.03%
2007	2,859	+1.70%
2012	2,724	−0.96%
2017	2,693	−0.23%
2023	2,699	+0.04%
Source: INSEE

== See also ==
- Communes of the Orne department
