= Tessé-Froulay =

- Commune
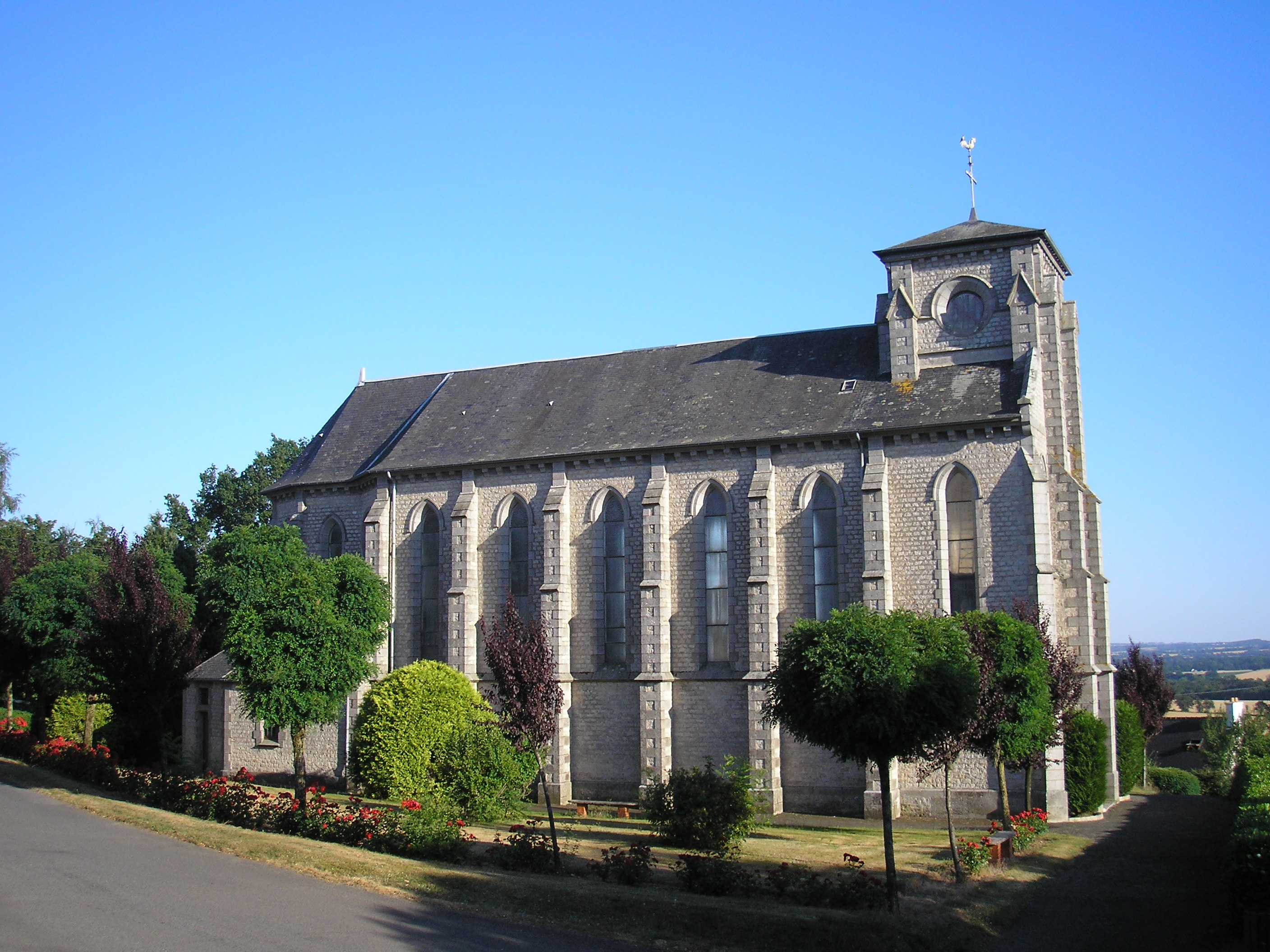
- The church in Tessé-Froulay
- Location of Tessé-Froulay
- Location within France Location within Normandy
- Coordinates: 48°31′40″N 0°25′47″W
- Country: France
- Region: Normandy
- Department: Orne
- Arrondissement: Alençon
- Canton: Bagnoles de l'Orne Normandie
- Intercommunality: Andaine-Passais

Government
  - Mayor (2020–2026): Philippe Alleaume
- Area^{1}: 5.24 km^{2} (2.02 sq mi)
- Elevation: 167 m (548 ft)
- Highest elevation: 193 m (633 ft)
- Lowest elevation: 123 m (404 ft)
- Population (2023): 375
  - Density: 71.6/km^{2} (185/sq mi)
- Time zone: UTC+01:00 (CET)
  - Summer (DST): UTC+02:00 (CEST)
- INSEE/Postal code: 61482 /61410
- ^{1} French Land Register data, which excludes lakes, ponds, glaciers > 1 km^{2} (0.386 sq mi or 247 acres) and river estuaries.

Tessé-Froulay (French pronunciation: [tɛse fʁulɛ]) is a commune in the Orne department in north-western France.

== Geography ==
The commune is made up of the following collection of villages and hamlets, Les Buards, L'Érable, Monsoret, Le Moulin de Tessé, La Chevallerie, Le Bois de Tessé, Tessé-Froulay, Lanfrêne and La Nerrerie.

The commune is located within the Normandie-Maine Regional Natural Park.

== See also ==
- Communes of the Orne department
- Parc naturel régional Normandie-Maine
