= Saint-Roch-sur-Égrenne =

- Commune
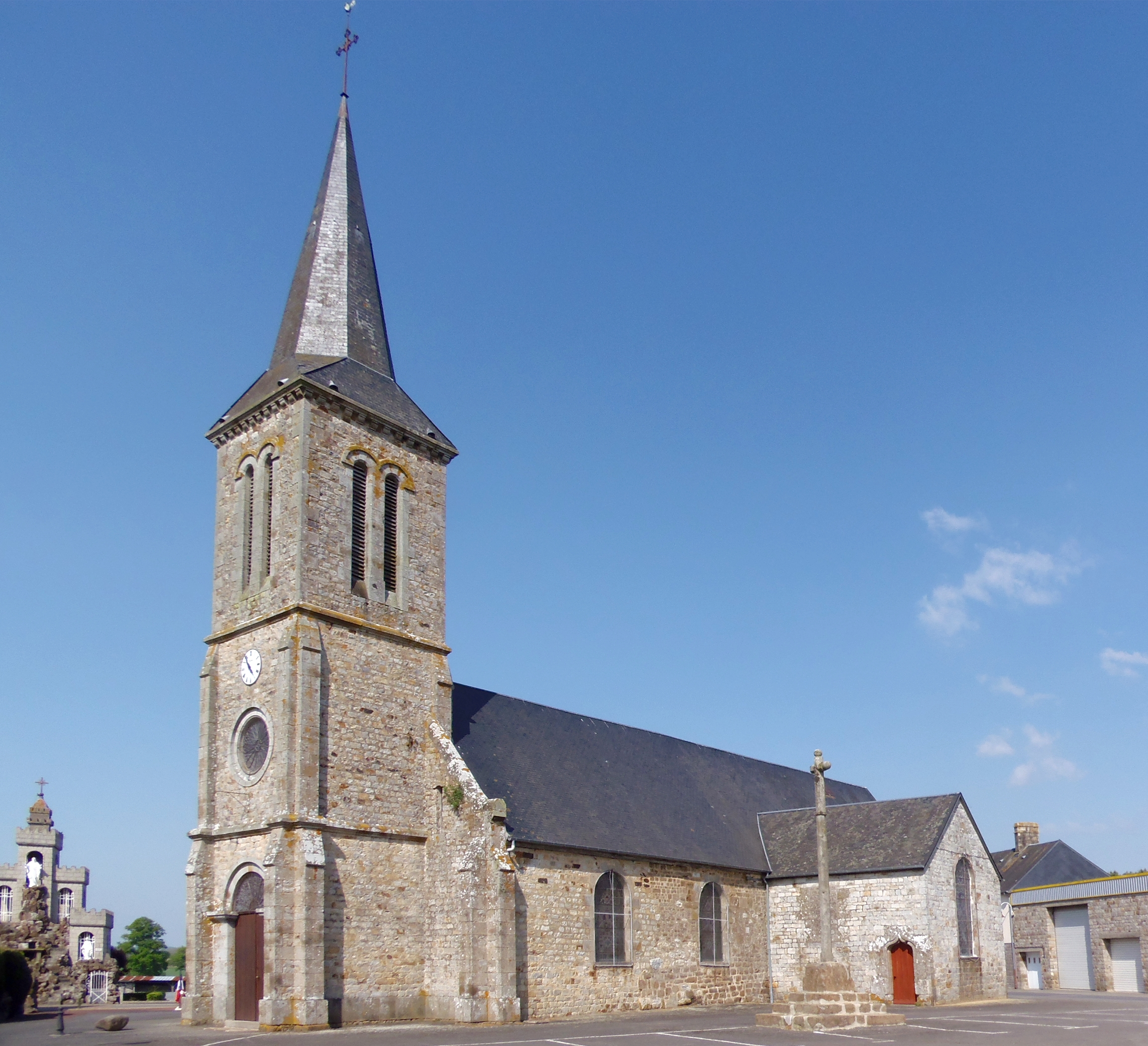
- The church in Saint-Roch-sur-Égrenne
- Location of Saint-Roch-sur-Égrenne
- Location within France Location within Normandy
- Coordinates: 48°34′38″N 0°44′40″W
- Country: France
- Region: Normandy
- Department: Orne
- Arrondissement: Alençon
- Canton: Bagnoles de l'Orne Normandie

Government
  - Mayor (2020–2026): Christian Coupel
- Area^{1}: 12.29 km^{2} (4.75 sq mi)
- Elevation: 130 m (430 ft)
- Highest elevation: 171 m (561 ft)
- Lowest elevation: 116 m (381 ft)
- Population (2023): 148
  - Density: 12.0/km^{2} (31.2/sq mi)
- Time zone: UTC+01:00 (CET)
  - Summer (DST): UTC+02:00 (CEST)
- INSEE/Postal code: 61452 /61350
- ^{1} French Land Register data, which excludes lakes, ponds, glaciers > 1 km^{2} (0.386 sq mi or 247 acres) and river estuaries.

Saint-Roch-sur-Égrenne (French pronunciation: [sɛ̃ ʁɔk syʁ eɡʁɛn]) is a commune in the Orne department in north-western France.

== Geography ==
The commune is made up of the following collection of villages and hamlets, Saint-Roch-sur-Égrenne and Les Hulis.

The river Égrenne flows through the commune.

The commune is in the Normandie-Maine Regional Natural Park.

== Points of interest ==
=== National heritage sites ===
- Manoir de Loraille is a sixteenth century Manor house, it was registered as a Monument historique in 1975.

== See also ==
- Communes of the Orne department
