= Mantilly =

- Commune
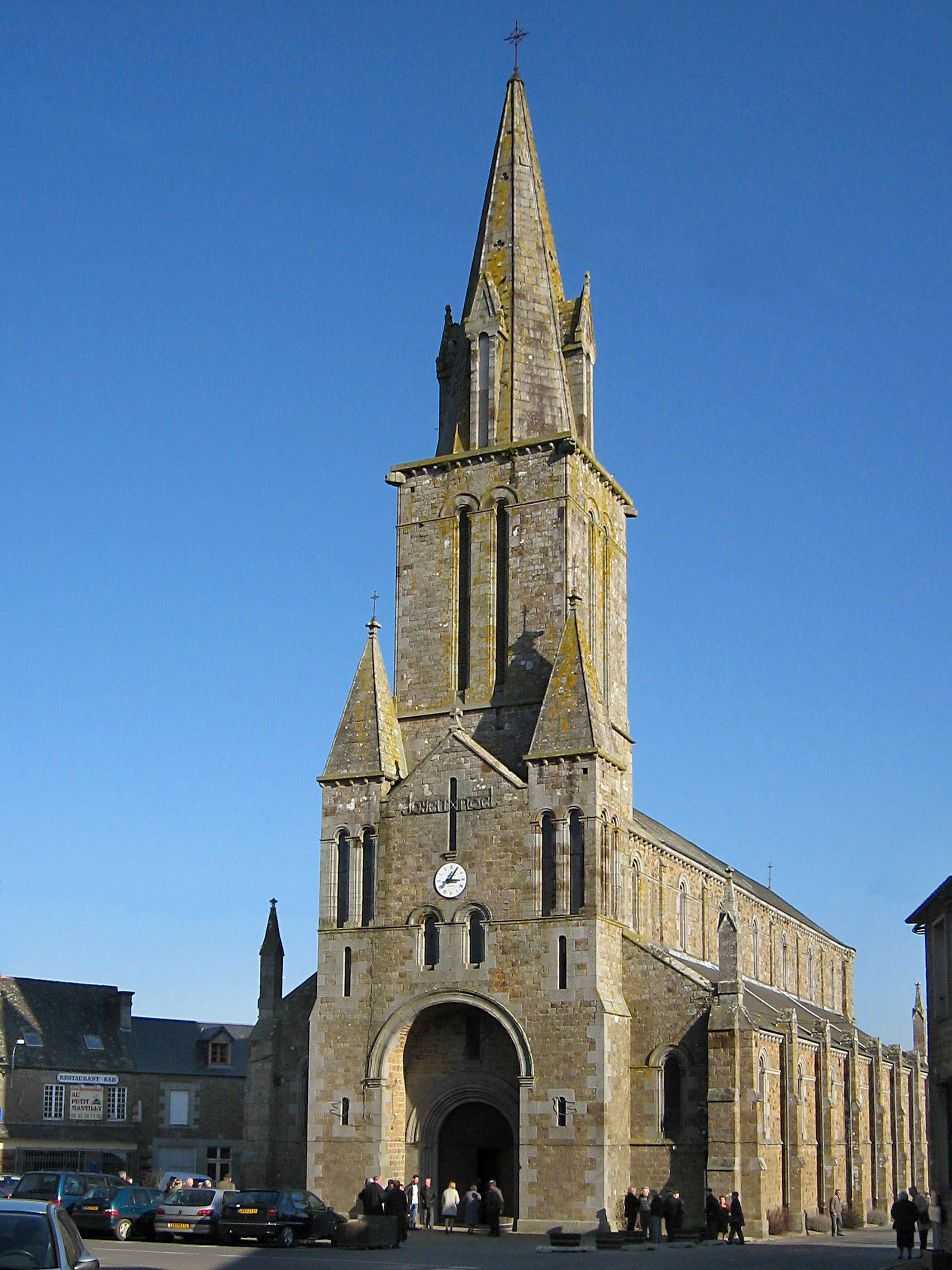
- The church in Mantilly
- Location of Mantilly
- Location within France Location within Normandy
- Coordinates: 48°31′18″N 0°48′00″W
- Country: France
- Region: Normandy
- Department: Orne
- Arrondissement: Alençon
- Canton: Bagnoles de l'Orne Normandie
- Intercommunality: Andaine-Passais

Government
  - Mayor (2020–2026): Eric Roulleaux
- Area^{1}: 28.70 km^{2} (11.08 sq mi)
- Highest elevation: 217 m (712 ft)
- Lowest elevation: 154 m (505 ft)
- Population (2023): 508
  - Density: 17.7/km^{2} (45.8/sq mi)
- Demonym: Mantillois
- Time zone: UTC+01:00 (CET)
  - Summer (DST): UTC+02:00 (CEST)
- INSEE/Postal code: 61248 /61350
- ^{1} French Land Register data, which excludes lakes, ponds, glaciers > 1 km^{2} (0.386 sq mi or 247 acres) and river estuaries.

Mantilly (French pronunciation: [mɑ̃tiji]) is a commune in the Orne department in north-western France.

== Geography ==
The commune is made up of the following collection of villages and hamlets, La Tournerie, L'Épine des Champs, Mantilly, La Bostière, Le Fourmond and Dompierre.

The river Colmont flows through this commune.

The commune is in the Normandie-Maine Regional Natural Park.

== See also ==
- Communes of the Orne department
