= Épinay-sur-Odon =

- Commune
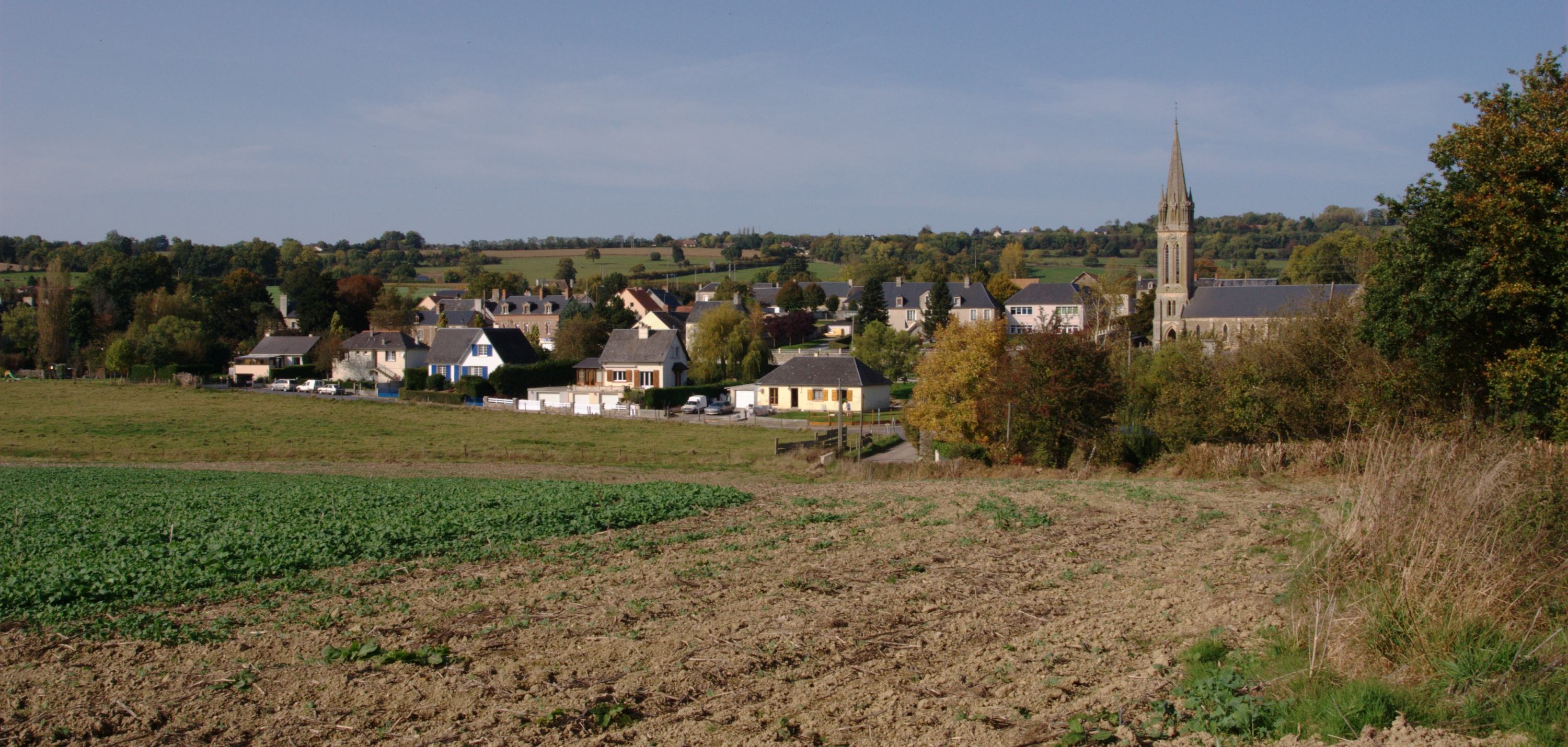
- A general view of Épinay-sur-Odon

- Coat of arms
- Location of Épinay-sur-Odon
- Location within France Location within Normandy
- Coordinates: 49°04′38″N 0°37′11″W
- Country: France
- Region: Normandy
- Department: Calvados
- Arrondissement: Vire
- Canton: Les Monts d'Aunay
- Intercommunality: Pré-Bocage Intercom

Government
  - Mayor (2020–2026): Hélène Payet
- Area^{1}: 11.58 km^{2} (4.47 sq mi)
- Elevation: 100 m (330 ft)
- Highest elevation: 209 m (686 ft)
- Lowest elevation: 76 m (249 ft)
- Population (2023): 632
  - Density: 54.6/km^{2} (141/sq mi)
- Time zone: UTC+01:00 (CET)
  - Summer (DST): UTC+02:00 (CEST)
- INSEE/Postal code: 14241 /14310
- ^{1} French Land Register data, which excludes lakes, ponds, glaciers > 1 km^{2} (0.386 sq mi or 247 acres) and river estuaries.

Épinay-sur-Odon (French pronunciation: [epinɛ syʁ ɔdɔ̃], literally Épinay on Odon) is a commune in the Calvados department in the Normandy region in northwestern France.

== Geography ==
The commune is made up of the following collection of villages and hamlets, Épinay-sur-Odon, Épène, Les Gouix, Le Mesnil Hermier and Vaux.

A single river the Odon, flows through the commune.

== Population ==
Historical population
Year	Pop.	±% p.a.
1968	347	—
1975	368	+0.84%
1982	442	+2.65%
1990	549	+2.75%
1999	536	−0.27%
2007	571	+0.79%
2012	673	+3.34%
2017	614	−1.82%
2023	632	+0.48%
Source: INSEE

== See also ==
- Communes of the Calvados department
