= Canton of Bagnoles de l'Orne Normandie =

Coordinates: 48.56°N 0.41°W

The canton of Bagnoles de l'Orne Normandie (before March 2020: canton of Bagnoles-de-l'Orne) is an administrative division of the Orne department, northwestern France. It was created at the French canton reorganisation which came into effect in March 2015. Its seat is in Bagnoles de l'Orne Normandie.

It consists of the following communes:

1. Bagnoles de l'Orne Normandie
2. Ceaucé
3. Juvigny-Val-d'Andaine
4. Mantilly
5. Passais-Villages
6. Perrou
7. Rives-d'Andaine
8. Saint-Fraimbault
9. Saint-Mars-d'Égrenne
10. Saint-Roch-sur-Égrenne
11. Tessé-Froulay
12. Torchamp
