= Cinq-Mars-la-Pile =

- Commune
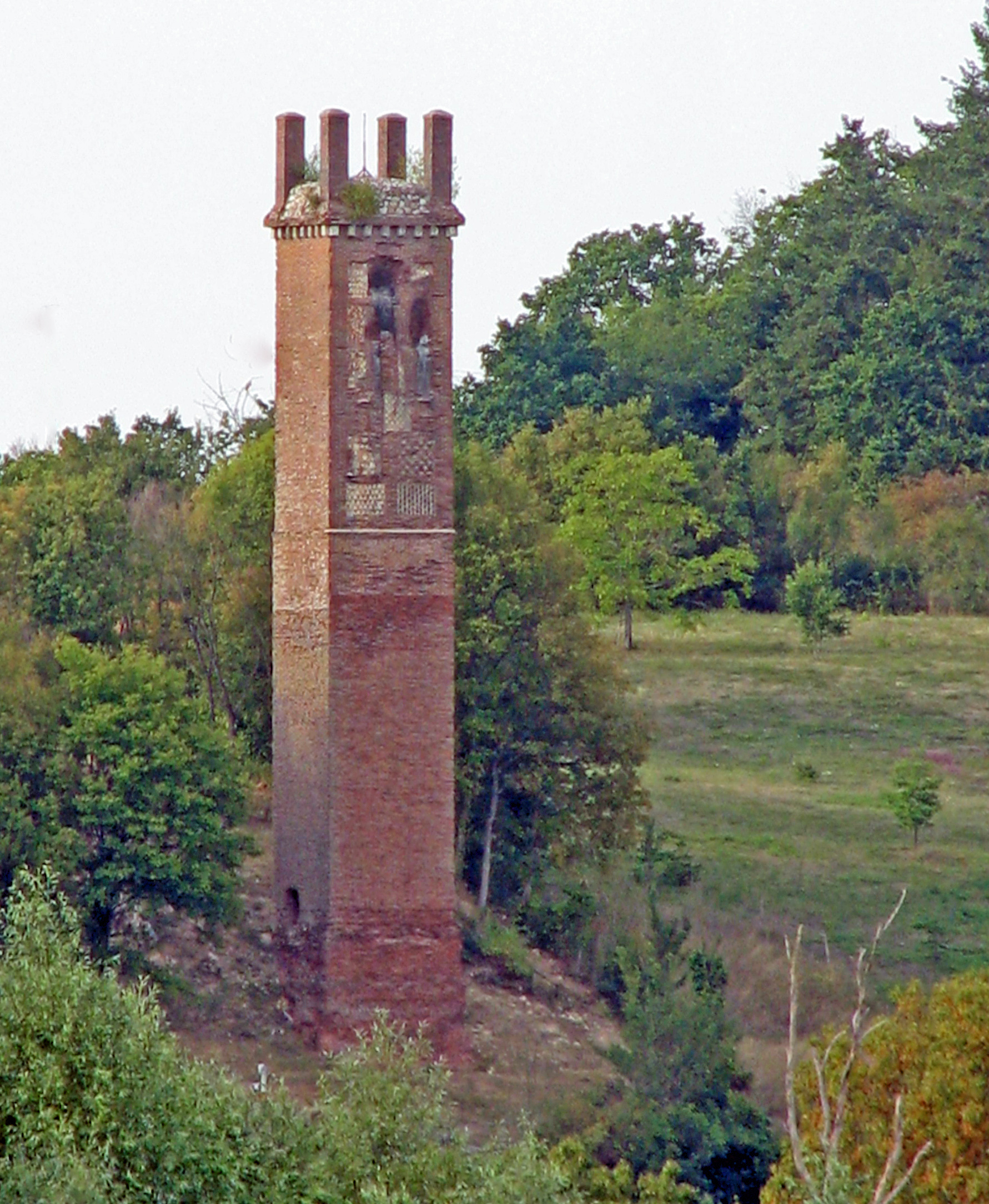
- The Pile, a Gallo-Roman tower

- Coat of arms
- Location of Cinq-Mars-la-Pile
- Location within France Location within Centre-Val de Loire
- Coordinates: 47°20′54″N 0°27′45″E
- Country: France
- Region: Centre-Val de Loire
- Department: Indre-et-Loire
- Arrondissement: Chinon
- Canton: Langeais

Government
  - Mayor (2020–2026): Sylvie Pointreau
- Area^{1}: 20.11 km^{2} (7.76 sq mi)
- Highest elevation: 101 m (331 ft)
- Lowest elevation: 37 m (121 ft)
- Population (2023): 4,015
  - Density: 199.7/km^{2} (517.1/sq mi)
- Time zone: UTC+01:00 (CET)
  - Summer (DST): UTC+02:00 (CEST)
- INSEE/Postal code: 37077 /37130
- ^{1} French Land Register data, which excludes lakes, ponds, glaciers > 1 km^{2} (0.386 sq mi or 247 acres) and river estuaries.

Cinq-Mars-la-Pile (French pronunciation: [sɛ̃ maʁ la pil]) is a commune in the Indre-et-Loire department in central France.

== Population ==
Historical population

Year	Pop.	±% p.a.
1793	1,200	—
1800	1,187	−0.16%
1806	1,102	−1.23%
1821	1,270	+0.95%
1831	1,626	+2.50%
1836	1,690	+0.78%
1841	1,728	+0.45%
1846	2,200	+4.95%
1851	1,889	−3.00%
1856	1,822	−0.72%
1861	1,999	+1.87%
1866	1,980	−0.19%
1872	1,962	−0.15%
1876	2,054	+1.15%
1881	2,152	+0.94%
1886	2,136	−0.15%
1891	2,058	−0.74%
1896	2,003	−0.54%
1901	2,010	+0.07%

Year	Pop.	±% p.a.
1906	1,941	−0.70%
1911	1,799	−1.51%
1921	1,791	−0.04%
1926	1,837	+0.51%
1931	1,731	−1.18%
1936	1,613	−1.40%
1946	1,850	+1.38%
1954	2,110	+1.66%
1962	2,080	−0.18%
1968	2,032	−0.39%
1975	1,955	−0.55%
1982	2,196	+1.67%
1990	2,370	+0.96%
1999	2,621	+1.12%
2007	3,175	+2.43%
2012	3,404	+1.40%
2017	3,566	+0.93%
2023	4,015	+2.00%

Source: EHESS and INSEE (1968-2023)

== Sights ==
- Pile of Cinq-Mars: the town derives its name from a thirty metres high, brick Roman tower perched on the hillside. It is remarkably well preserved. This is the highest funeral stack in Gaul (the other buildings are located in Aquitaine). In 2005, excavations unearthed remains of a monumental terrace with a remains of a building and a statue of a captive Oriental. The complex has been dated to the late second century or early third, seems to confirm it as a monument to a funeral pyre or pile. This aspect of the mausoleum suggests that it is a monument marking the grave of a dignitary of the Tours area, perhaps high-ranking military.
- Monument in honour of Robert H. Dunlap, General U.S. Marine who was killed in May 1931 while trying to rescue a woman in a landslide in the village. A veteran of the First World War he was in France to follow lectures at Military College. It is one of six memorials in the series "Borne de la Terre sacrée" by the sculptor and former soldier of the First World War, Deblaize Gaston.

== See also ==
- Communes of the Indre-et-Loire department
- Henri Coiffier de Ruzé, marquis de Cinq-Mars
- Cinq-Mars pile
