= Cinq-Mars pile =

Ancient tower in the commune of Cinq-Mars-la-Pile

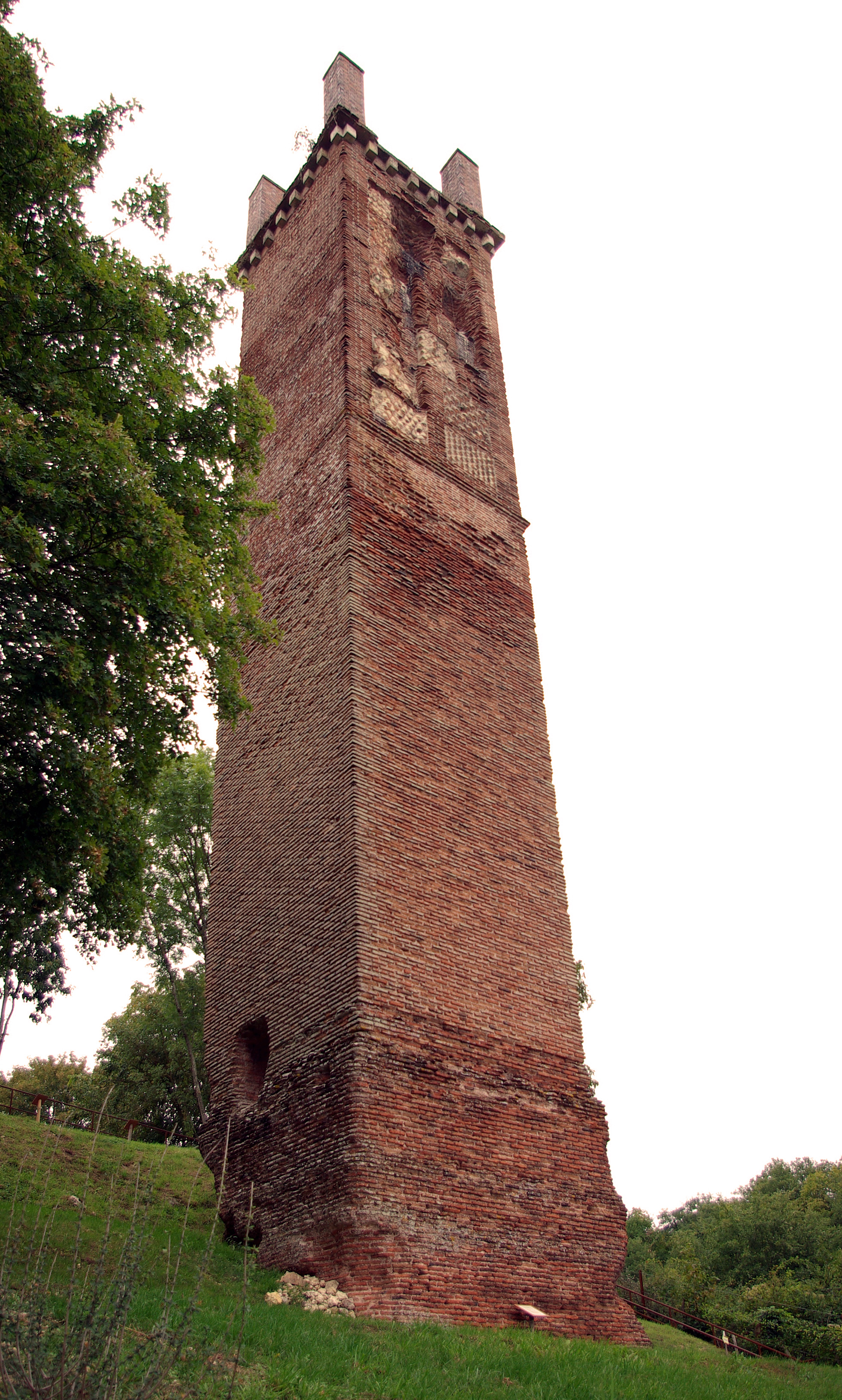
- Cinq-Mars pile
- Interactive map of Cinq-Mars pile
- Location: Cinq-Mars-la-Pile, Indre-et-Loire, France
- Coordinates: 47°21′15″N 0°28′42″E
- Type: Funeral pile
- Height: 29,60 m
- Beginning date: Late 1st early 2nd century
- Heritage: Historical monument (1840)

The Cinq-Mars pile is an ancient tower that overlooks the Loire Valley in the commune of Cinq-Mars-la-Pile, located in Indre-et-Loire, approximately twenty kilometers west of Tours.

The tower, nearly 30 meters high and exceptionally well-preserved, stands on the slope of a hill with abundant evidence of human occupation during antiquity.

This probable funerary monument (mausoleum or cenotaph) is part of a diverse group of similar structures in southwestern France, notably in Charente-Maritime and Gers. It has unique architectural features - brick cladding over Roman concrete and distinctive decoration, featuring twelve panels adorned with geometric motifs whose significance remains unknown, making it a one-of-a-kind monument in France. Its placement outside a funerary enclosure also appears unconventional.

This monument has been renowned for centuries, even mentioned by Rabelais in Gargantua (chapter XV of the 1534 first edition). Since the 19th century, when the first comprehensive studies and organized excavations were conducted, various theories have been proposed to explain its origin and function, with some more fanciful than others. However, none have been entirely convincing, including attempts to decipher the name "Cinq-Mars." A significant breakthrough in understanding the monument occurred in the early 21st century with the 2005 discovery of structures (podium, building) and decorative elements (statue) in its vicinity, revealing that the pile is part of a larger site. This larger site could potentially be a tomb or monument honoring a Turonian or Roman dignitary renowned for military achievements, likely constructed in the second half of the 2nd century or early 3rd century. The Cinq-Mars pile, possibly a later addition, may have been built to mark the location of this mausoleum or cenotaph and to enhance the prestige of this individual. It is speculated that the family of this dignitary resided nearby, possibly at a site as yet undiscovered, on the plateau north of the pile.

The site underwent developments in 2010 to enhance visitor reception and information. Since 2014, the podium walls have been undergoing restoration.

== Location and toponymy ==
The Cinq-Mars-la-Pile commune is located 18 km downstream from Tours, along the Loire. The village center is on the right bank, at the base, and on the slope of the hill.

The Cinq-Mars pile is located 1.5 km east of the main town of the commune. It sits on the slope of a hill on a small artificially leveled terrace (Note: The leveling of the terrace ground was done before the construction of the pile. However, it is unclear how much time passed between these two operations or if the leveling was specifically done in preparation for the pile's construction. (Note: Marot & Marlet 2005, p. 29: Construction du podium et des murs de soutènement)) measuring 50 × 19 m (Note: Audin 1977, p. 353) at an altitude of 60 m. The plateau is 250 m north of the pile reaches an altitude of 80 m, while the valley at 40 m altitude is only 100 m south of the pile. In the 21st century, the confluence of the Loire and the Cher rivers is located in this area.

The Cinq-Mars pile was located on private land in 1840 when it was designated as a historical monument. Over the years, through legal proceedings, (Note: Bordeaux & Seigne 2006, pp. 135–136: Acquisition et premiers travaux de restauration) the monument and the surrounding land parcels are now owned by the Indre-et-Loire departmental council in the 21st century. (Note: Marot 2008a, p. 2: Introduction)

The toponym Cinq-Mars [la-Pile] is probably derived from Sanctus Medardus (Saint Médard), as seen in texts from the 10th to 16th centuries (Rabelais mentions "sainct Mars auprés de Langés" in the 1542 edition of Gargantua). Attempts to explain this toponym by the presence of five pillars (five marks or milestones) at the top of the pile, or by the existence of the tomb of five warriors (quinque martes) or a famous character (Quintus Marcius) are not convincing, even if they cannot be definitively ruled out.

== The pile in the 21st century ==
=== General architecture ===
==== Structure and general dimensions ====
Pile is a generic term used to describe ancient monuments, typically assumed as funerary structures in the form of solid towers. This particular pile stands at a height of 29.60 meters, equivalent to one hundred Roman feet. It bears resemblance to other piles found in the Centre-Val de Loire region, such as those in Marcé-sur-Esves (Indre-et-Loire) and Mazangé (Loir-et-Cher), as well as in Charente-Maritime (Tour de Pirelonge). Similar structures can also be found near Auch, with twelve examples recorded, and in Saint-Bertrand-de-Comminges, where at least five exist, despite their varied appearances. The Cinq-Mars pile also shares similarities with funerary monuments in Germania, like the Igel Column.

The pile consists of five superimposed structures from the foundation to the capstone.

==== Foundations ====
At the base of the pile, the tufa terrace on the hillside was levelled and then overcut. A layer of fine gravel (dry stone masonry) was placed at the bottom of this excavation to complete the levelling of the ground, and on this base a 1.30 m high masonry mass was built, composed of a mixture of limestone and siliceous stones bonded with pink tuileau mortar, which forms the base of the monument's structure. (Note: Meffre 1844, p. 184) (Note: Audin 1977, p. 356)

==== Three elevation levels ====
In the construction of the pile, two types of materials are used, excluding the capstone. The facing consists of rectangular bricks measuring on average 0.36 × 0.24 m with a thickness of 0.04 m. (Note: Bèche 1999, p. 17: Architecture) These bricks are laid flat in five rows, alternating in width and length to avoid vertical joint alignment. An estimated 104,000 bricks are used in 580 rows from the base to the top of the pile. The bricks may have been locally made, as suggested by the continued presence of brick-making in Cinq-Mars-la-Pile until the 1930s. The facing, with a smooth inner face, (Note: Bèche 1999, p. 18: Architecture) encloses a rubble masonry core about 1.90 m thick. The core contains larger stones in the center, decreasing in size towards the face. The limestone stones in the core, bound with mortar, likely originate from local quarries, possibly from the hill itself. (Note: Meffre 1844, p. 181)

No putlog holes are visible on the pile walls, indicating that the scaffolding used during the construction was placed directly against the structure. The pile's elevation consists of three sub-assemblies above the foundations.

Stack second stage offset.

Eastward offset. (Note: The excavation seen in the pile wall, about 20 meters high, is the outcome of unauthorized digging.)

Northward offset.

The base of the pile measures 5.80 meters per side, equivalent to 20 Roman feet at ground level, with a height of 4.75 meters. Gradually narrowing towards the top, its width decreases to slightly over 5.00 meters, resembling a truncated pyramid. This design, with slightly protruding brick rows, aims to replicate the cornices and moldings of Roman architecture, showcasing a significant aesthetic endeavor. (Note: Bèche 1999, p. 24: Architecture)

The first floor of the main body of the pyramid is 16.50 meters high and measures only 4.40 meters per side, equivalent to 15 Roman feet. It is adorned with a protruding cord made of two rows of bricks at the top. This pyramid section is notably uniform, with occasional variations in mortar color suggesting possible restoration efforts. (Note: Bèche 1999, p. 25: Architecture)

The third component of the pile's elevation (second floor), which is 9 meters high, has a slight setback compared to the previous one (with a square base of 4.30 meters per side). However, this setback is not consistent on all four sides of the pile; it is smaller to the north and non-existent to the east. As a result, this part of the pile appears to be "placed" on the previous one but offset to the northeast. This misalignment could be attributed to a construction error or it may have been intentional to rebalance the structure. There is no definitive evidence to determine between the two possibilities. (Note: Bèche 1999, pp. 26–27: Architecture)

==== Capstone ====
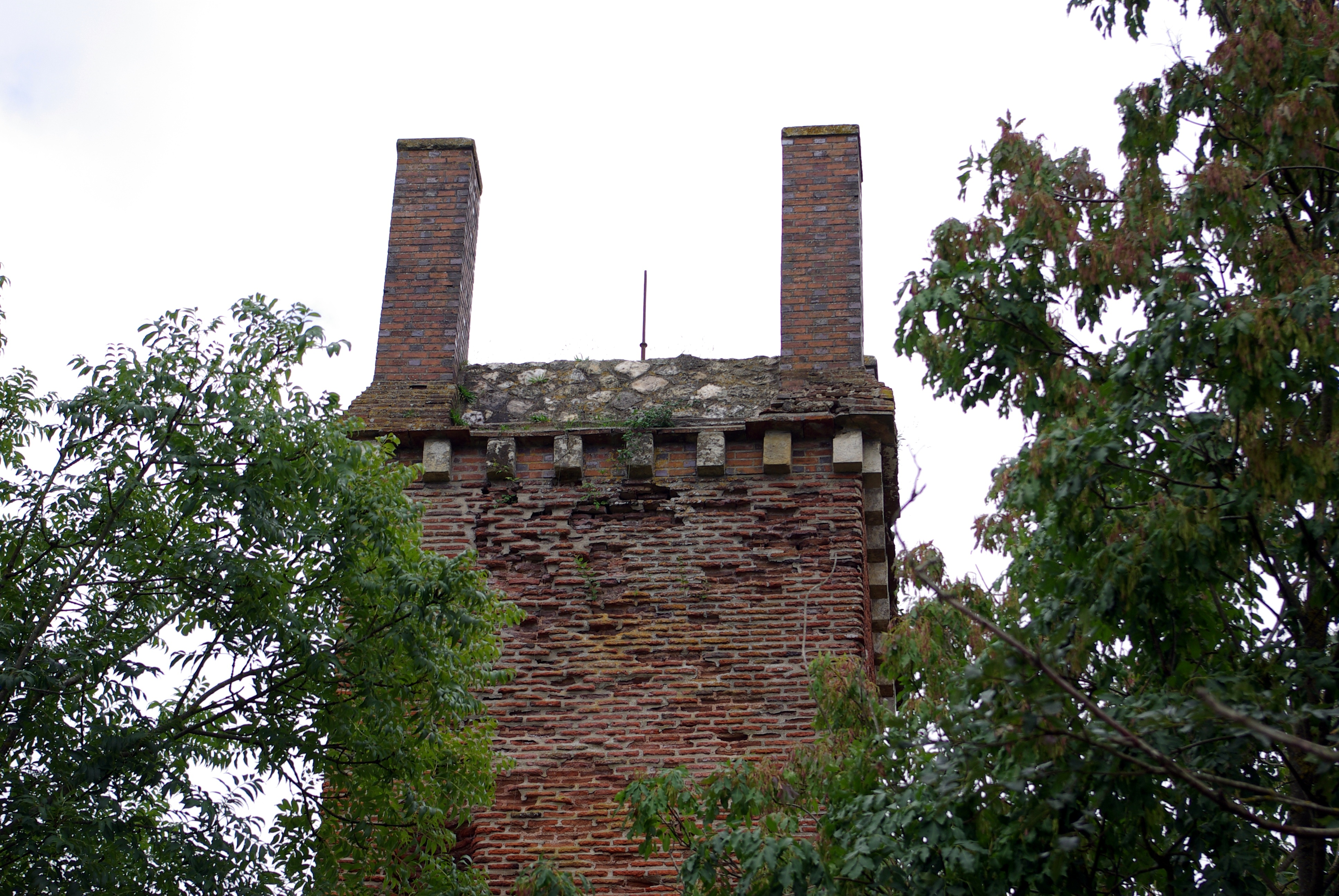
Pile capstone, north face.

The modern capstone of the stack includes a series of corbels (eight on each side) alternating with recessed bricks. These corbels support a flattened rhomboidal pyramid at each corner, each equipped with a small square-sectioned brick pillar (0.37 m per side and 3.25 m high). These pillars, resting on the corner corbels at the base of the capstone, are embedded in the corners of the rhomboidal pyramid and are topped with a small pyramid with jagged edges. (Note: Bèche 1999, p. 29: Architecture)

The architecture of this capstone, as it appears in the 21st century, has undergone significant changes from its original form. Successive repair and restoration projects have altered its appearance, making it difficult to determine its original configuration. Many questions remain unanswered about the sculptures on the modillions due to their degraded state in the 19th century. The shape of the large upper pyramid may have been a smooth-sided pyramid, and the exact number of pilettes is uncertain. The debate continues regarding the fifth pilette at the top of the large pyramid, (Note: Bordeaux & Seigne 2006, p. 139: Acquisition et premiers travaux de restauration) with local tradition suggesting it was overturned in 1751 after a hurricane. (Note: Meffre 1844, p. 179) If this fifth pilette did exist, it may have supported a funerary urn at its top, similar to the arrangement seen in Pompeii on the monument to Herennius Celsus, where a funerary urn sits atop a column. (Note: Bèche 1999, p. 78: Les recherches faites aux xixe et xxe siècles)

=== Decoration ===
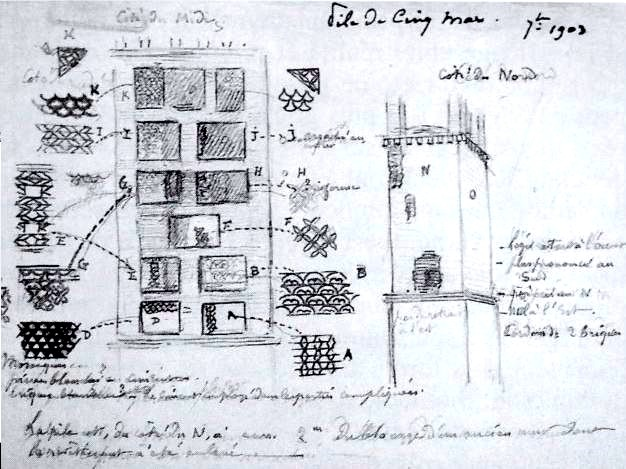
Reconstructed drawing of the stack decoration (Anonymous, 1903).

The south face of the pile, the most visible, features twelve panels in its upper part. Initially, there was debate over the number of panels, which was set at eleven due to the poor conservation state of some. However, the twelfth panel, proposed by Louis de La Saussaye in 1835, now seems to be the consensus. (Note: Bèche 1999, pp. 34–37: Décor) The panels are made of red bricks and white limestone stones arranged alternately with mortar. The mortar, sometimes heavily red-tinted due to crushed brick, even contributes to the decoration of some panels. (Note: Bèche 1999, p. 30: Décor) The panels are embedded in the facing of the pile to a depth of 0.36 m and measure about one meter per side for the nine largest. They are arranged in six rows, with three, two, two, one, two, and two panels from top to bottom. Four layers of bricks separate each row of decorative panels. There are no molding frames around the decorative panels. In contrast to other funerary piles in Aquitaine, where the most visible face is carved with a niche for a statue, this pile features decorative panels on its face.

Detail of the decoration on the south face. Panels are numbered from left to right and top to bottom.

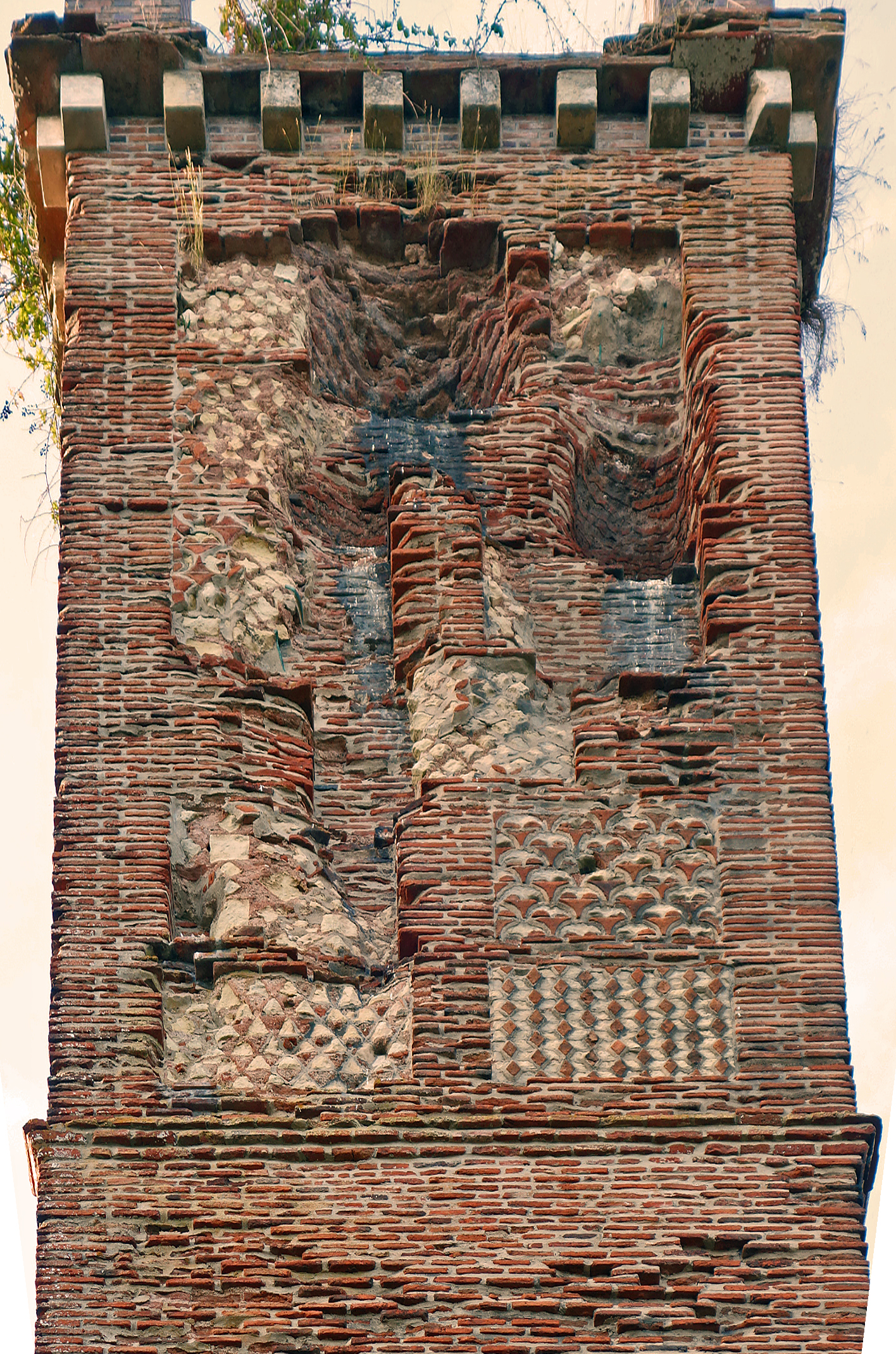
Cinq-Mars pile. Brick decoration, south face.

Four of these panels are almost intact, allowing for a possible reconstruction of their decoration. Four of them are destroyed, and their original appearance cannot be predicted. The remaining four are damaged, but the surviving parts do not allow for a plausible reconstruction of their decoration, (Note: Audin 1977, p. 354) except for panel no. 3, which can be attributed, by symmetry, to the same decoration as panel No. 1. (Note: The panels are numbered from left to right and top to bottom.) Attempts to reconstruct this decoration have been more or less successful, with one of the most accurate seeming to be from 1903. Several hypotheses have been put forward to explain the deterioration of the decorations: cannonballs were allegedly fired at the pile from Villandry, more than 3 km southeast of the pile, or the bricks were "eaten by the moon. (Note: Bordeaux & Seigne 2006, p. 139: Les « mosaïques » de la face sud)" The reality seems much simpler: besides natural erosion, it is known that before the 19th century, people climbed along the face of the pile using ropes or scaffolding to attack the decoration with picks. The tool marks were visible during the restoration campaign that started in 1843. This was likely done to recover elements or, more likely, to find a "treasure" as the cavities made exceed the thickness of the decorative panels. (Note: Meffre 1844, p. 189)

Possible reconstruction of the decoration of the best-preserved panels of the pile

Panels No. 1 and 3.

Panel No. 10.

Panel No. 11.

Panel No. 12.

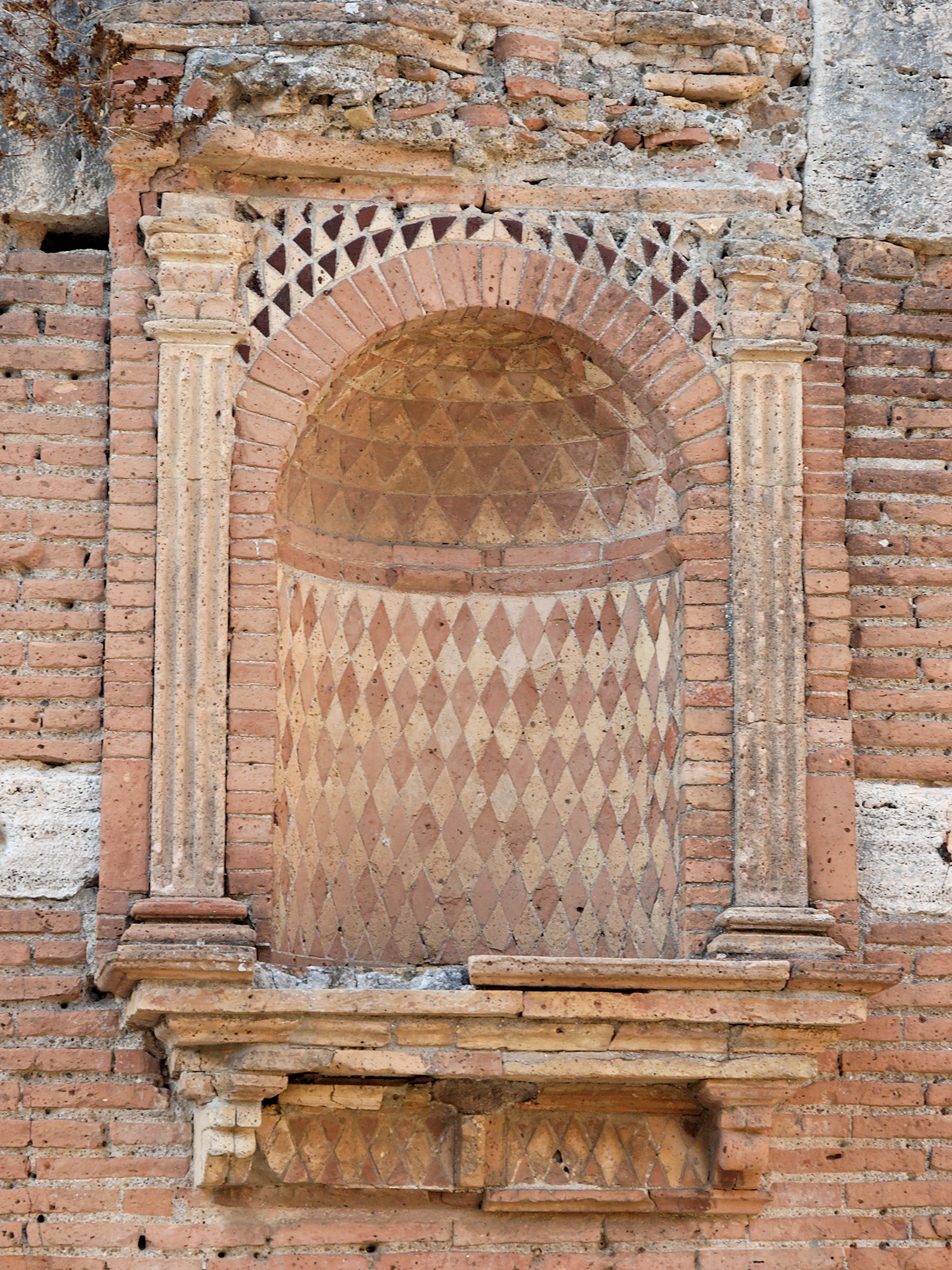
Niches decoration of Ostia's lars.

The motif on the Cinq-Mars pile is unique among Gallo-Roman monuments in France, both in its ornamentation and the materials used. Similar decorations related to opus sectile, found only in the region of Rome or Ostia (such as lararium niches of the Caseggiato del Larario, Horrea epagathiana, and Horrea epaphroditiana) and precisely dated to the second half of the 2nd century, suggest that the builder or commissioner of this pile may have traveled to this part of the Roman world. They could have been inspired by the motifs they encountered and "imported" them to Gaul a few years or decades later, setting the maximum age of the pile. (Note: Bèche 1999, p. 38: Décor) The enigmatic decoration of the Cinq-Mars pile has led to numerous interpretations, (Note: Bèche 1999, p. 77: Les recherches faites aux xixe et xxe siècles) with a 19th-century historian suggesting it depicted Roman board games, or La Sauvagère imagining trompe-l'œil windows.

Two seemingly unrelated sources have mentioned an inscription on a marble or cast iron plaque attached to the pile, which supposedly refers to the burial of five individuals under or near the pile. This inscription, which is undated and no longer exists in the 21st century, may have once been real, but its authenticity is highly doubtful. (Note: Bordeaux & Seigne 2006, p. 140: Une inscription de dédicace sur la face nord ?) It appears to have been created later to reinforce the local legend of five warriors (quinque martes) believed to be the source of the name Cinq-Mars-la-Pile. (Note: Marot 2008a, p. 7: Recherches anciennes)

== The pile surroundings ==
Restored plan of the pile site. The red star marks the site where the statue was found.

The Cinq-Mars pile is not a standalone ancient structure. Other elements dating from the first centuries of our era are either confirmed or highly probable near the monument. Various constructions that no longer exist have been mentioned in historical texts in connection with the pile. The slope, both east and west of Cinq-Mars-la-Pile, once housed several dwellings or secondary settlements. (Note: Marot 2008a, pp. 4 et 5: Environnement du site) Some constructions or place names referenced in ancient texts hint at the ancient buildings near the pile, but their existence is not well-documented.

=== Nearby ancient roads ===
At the base of the slope, directly below the south face of the hill and approximately 15 meters down, lies the ancient road that connects Tours to Angers. This road is identified a little further west, in front of the Cinq-Mars church. There may have been a parallel ridge path on the northern slope of the site. The road is bordered on both sides of Cinq-Mars-la-Pile by well-documented ancient sites: to the east, the Malliacum complex in Luynes, possibly a secondary settlement, and to the west, a necropolis at Saint-Patrice. (Note: Bèche 1999, p. 13: Environnement éloigné)

The accessibility of the site is uncertain. (Note: Bèche 1999, p. 5: Environnement immédiat) It is possible that the northern terrace and its associated building were accessible via the slope. However, direct communication between the two terraces is less certain, and the necessity for access to the pile itself remains unclear. (Note: Marot & Marlet 2005, p. 45: Aménagement du podium : construction d'un édifice semi-excavé)

=== A constructed podium ===
==== A monumental terrace ====
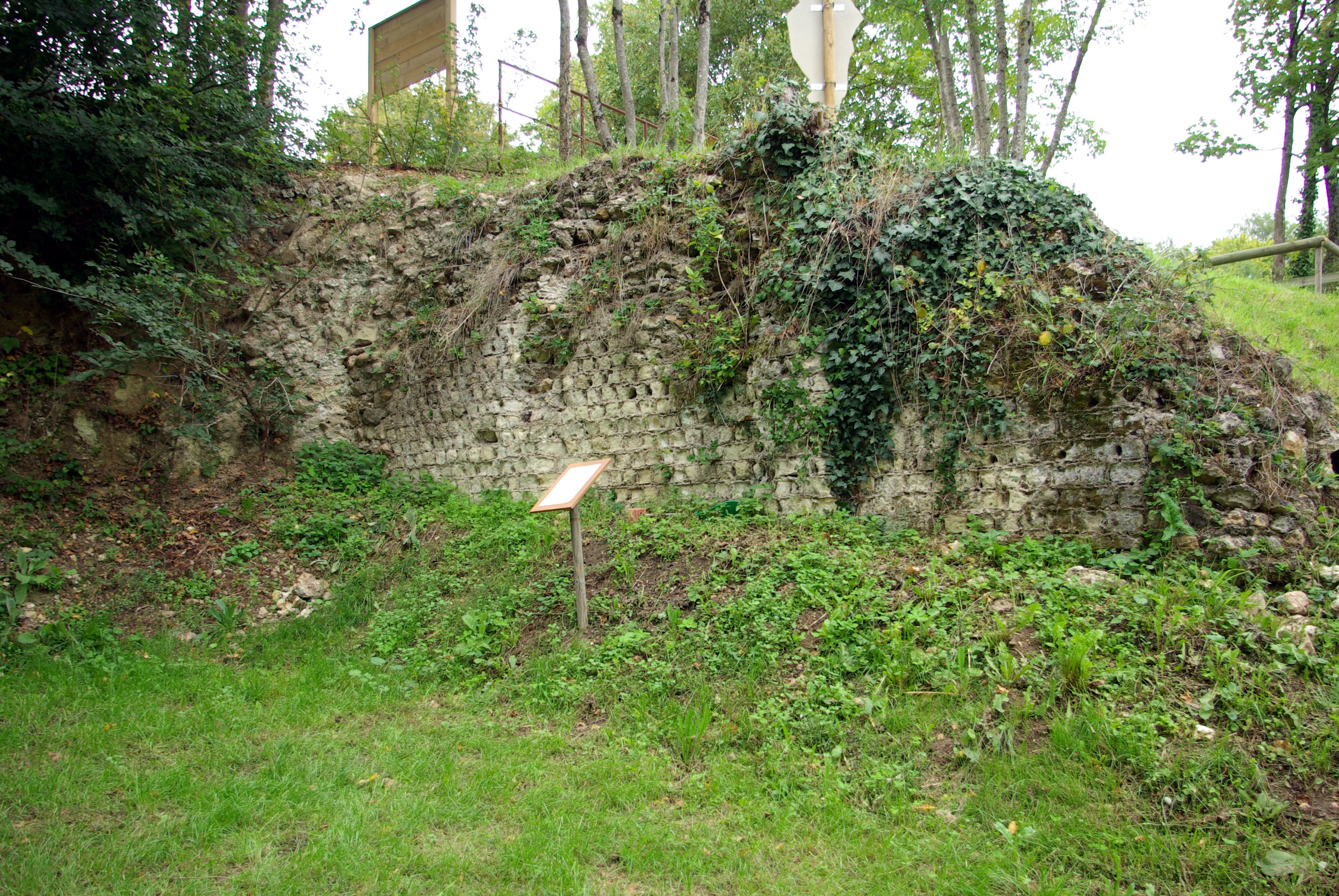
North-south podium wall in its current state.

The 2005 excavations revealed the remains of a monumental terrace located a few meters north of the pile. These masonry structures had been mentioned previously but had not received much attention from researchers primarily focused on the pile. (Note: Marot & Marlet 2005, p. 16: Historique des recherches) The terrace consists of at least three walls made of small, rectangular, very regular rubble stone, jointed with mortar. These walls create a podium that extends from the rock, with two walls running east-west, one extending southward and the other northward, while a perpendicular wall connects the two and defines the terrace's western boundary. (Note: Marot & Marlet 2005, pp. 33–35: Construction du podium et des murs de soutènement) Due to erosion at the site, it is unclear whether another wall or a staircase once bordered the podium to the east.

Principle of veneering a pilaster against the north-south wall.

The site developers utilized the natural topography effectively, especially by incorporating a small rocky spur. They likely sculpted the rock in certain areas to create two terraces: one lower terrace at the level of the pile and another higher terrace on the natural rocky outcrop, which served as the podium to the north. The gap between the rock and the chemise and retaining walls was filled with backfill as construction progressed. This backfill contains pottery elements from the Tasciaca workshops, dating back to the second half of the second century. (Note: Marot & Marlet 2005, p. 40: Remblai de construction et niveau de circulation interne) The walls do not display any visible putlog holes on their outer faces, indicating that they were constructed from the upper terrace, with masons gradually building up their work using construction backfill.

The north retaining wall, which runs along the rock and shields the lower terrace from rockfalls, is equipped with a tile-lined gutter at its top, likely used for draining water from the podium. Although only a short section of this wall is preserved, it likely extended westward for several dozen meters. (Note: Marot & Marlet 2005, pp. 31–32: Construction du podium et des murs de soutènement)

The north-south oriented wall features pilasters that appear to be purely decorative, as they lack proper foundations and are simply attached to the wall they adorn.

The south wall of the podium features similar architecture, possibly with pilasters on its exterior face, although this is not confirmed. It terminates to the east without clear evidence of continuation, but it did likely extend further. This wall was designed to support the backfill of the podium, but it appears to have collapsed under the weight, gradually crumbling from the top. (Note: Marot & Marlet 2005, pp. 37–39: Construction du podium et des murs de soutènement)

==== A small building ====
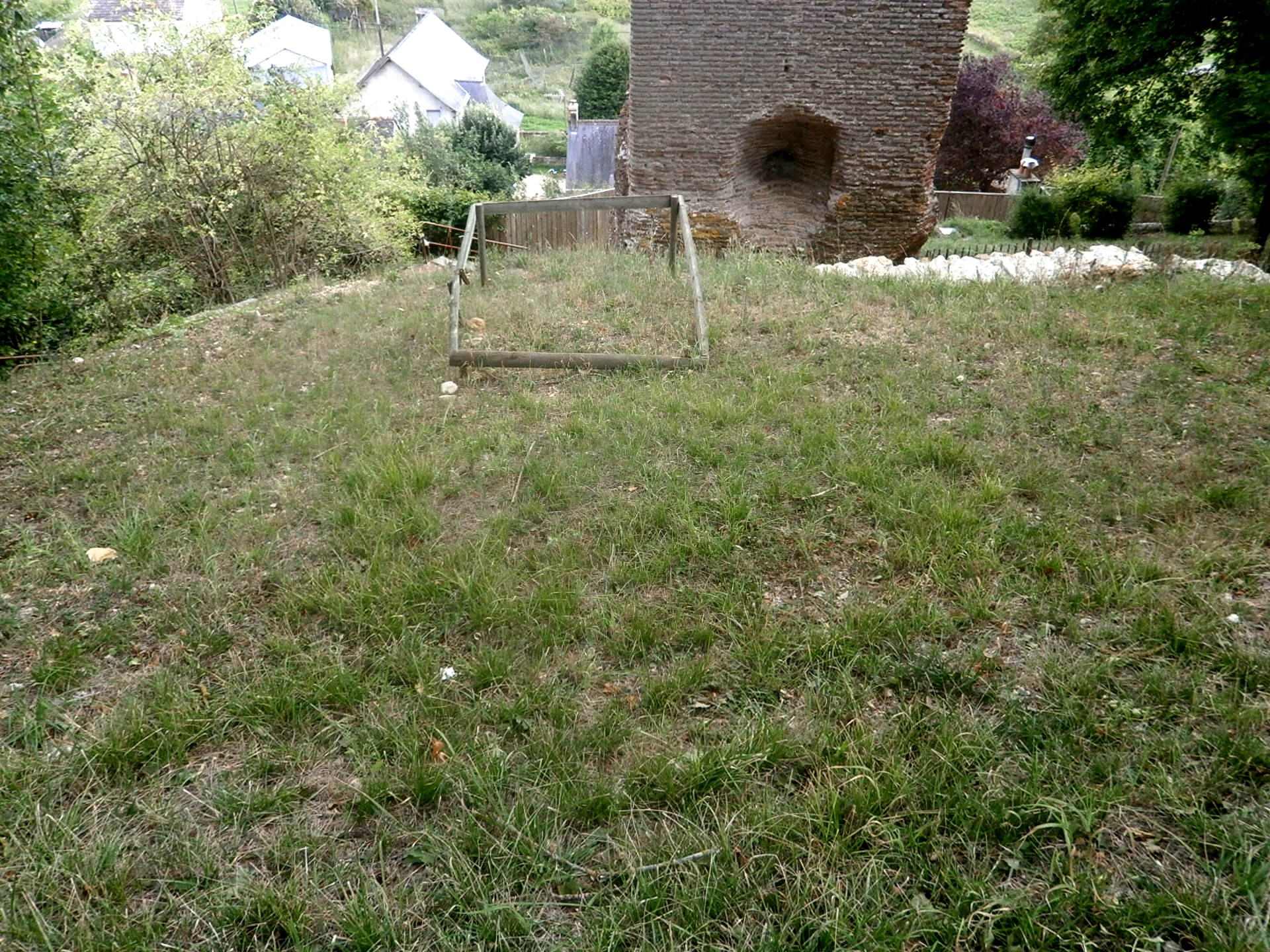
Podium, looking south with pile below. (Note: The wooden rectangle indicates the position of the building supported by the podium.)

The podium supports a building of uncertain purpose, believed to have been built around the same time as the terrace in the second half of the second century or early third century. It is partially carved into the rock that forms the core of the terrace, with its floor estimated to be 1.25 meters below the podium level, likely made of wood. (Note: Marot & Marlet 2005, p. 44: Aménagement du podium : construction d'un édifice semi-excavé) The building is approximately 4.5 by 3.5 meters in size with an unknown height. Its masonry is irregular, except for the carefully cornered angles. (Note: Marot & Marlet 2005, p. 42: Aménagement du podium : construction d'un édifice semi-excavé) Tiles found on site, similar to those used for the retaining wall's gutter, suggest the roofing method. The interior layout is mostly unknown, with a possible niche in the north wall. It likely faced south towards the valley, accessible via a staircase leading to the podium's floor, with a doorway framed in whole or part by bricks.

The function of this building is strongly influenced by the role of the niche inside. It could house a statue of a deity (a sanctuary), an urn with a deceased's ashes (a mausoleum), or a figurative representation of someone buried elsewhere (a cenotaph). (Note: Marot & Marlet 2005, pp. 67–75: L'ensemble monumental au nord de la pile)

==== A statue ====
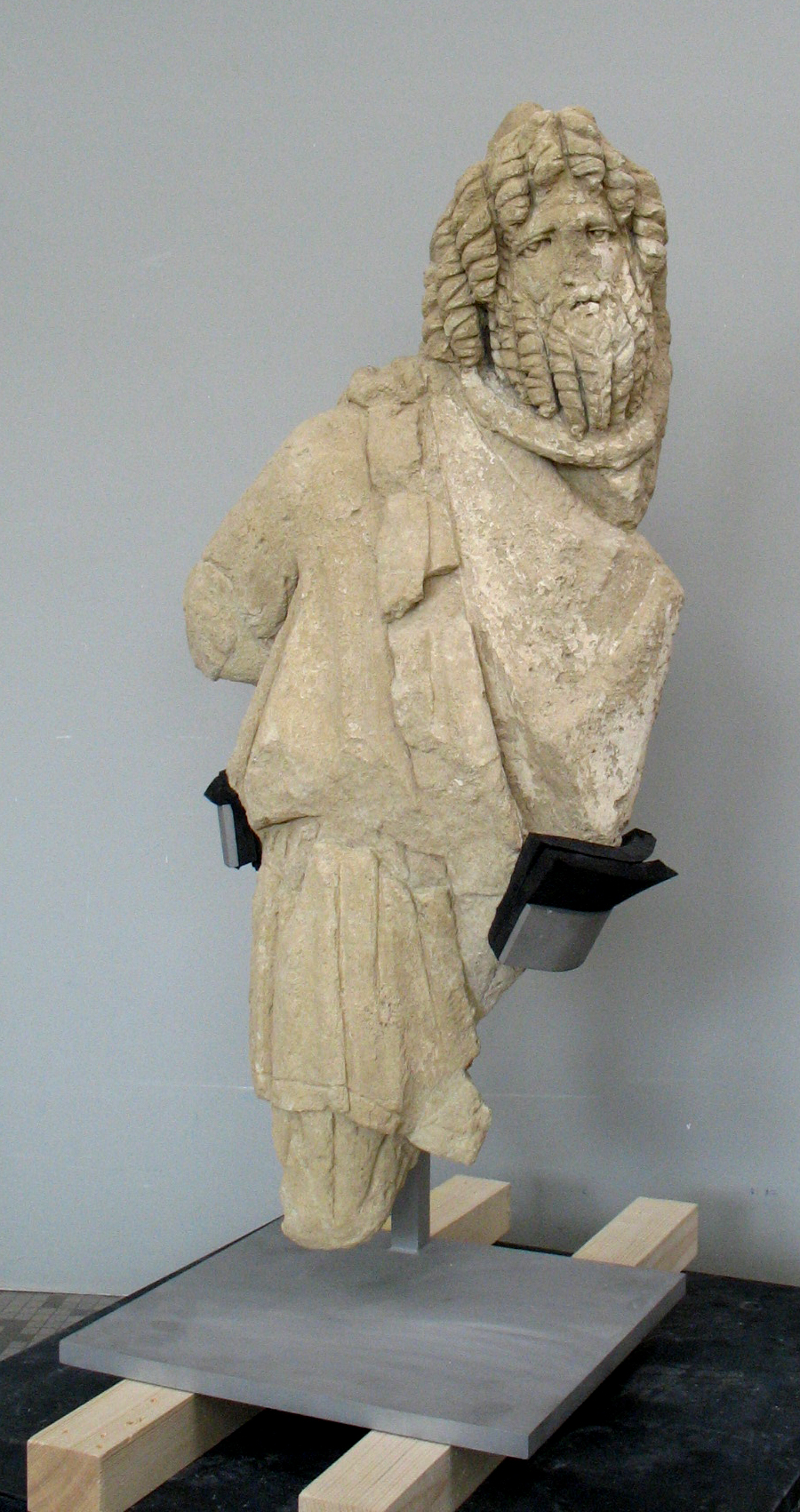
Statue of the Cinq-Mars pile restored.

A human-sized statue in the round was discovered on the site, missing its base and with its head, adorned with a Phrygian cap, detached from the body. (Note: Chédeville 2009, p. 44: Description) The statue was carved from yellow Turonian tuff, dating back around 90 million years, with nearby outcrops. (Note: Chédeville 2009, pp. 47–48: Matériau constitutif) Following carving, a fine plaster layer was applied to the statue to smoothen its surface, potentially as a base for paint that has since disappeared. (Note: Chédeville 2009, p. 48: Taille et traitement de surface) Initially thought to depict the god Sabazios, a rare representation in the West, (Note: Chédeville 2009, p. 45: Une représentation de Sabazios ?) a 2007 restoration by Amélie Chédeville-Aubry revealed details such as a sorrowful expression, a hunched posture with possibly bound arms, and a potential shackle around the neck, indicating it likely represents an eastern captive, (Note: Chédeville 2009, p. 52: Apports de la restauration aux données archéologiques) possibly of Parthian origin. (Note: Marot 2008a, p. 30: Un captif oriental?)

This statue appears to be part of a larger ensemble, the rest of which has not yet been found. Its original placement is unknown, but it was discovered on the upper terrace, possibly deliberately placed there and then covered by a thin layer of colluvium. The most likely, though unconfirmed, theory is that the statue was originally part of a group located on the podium north of the pile, on a structure that has either been destroyed or has yet to be uncovered. The statue likely fell from its original location and was later found at its current site. (Note: Marot 2008a, p. 24: La statue)

Since September 2016, this statue has been displayed alongside other Gallic and ancient statues in a permanent exhibition room at the Grand-Pressigny Prehistory Museum.

=== Poorly attested ancient remains ===
Various authors have reported ancient constructions near the pile, but recent research has not confirmed these hypotheses. The Cinq-Mars castle is believed to have been built on ancient foundations. In 1843, "ancient masonry" was discovered 20 meters west of the pile. However, since the site was not excavated in 2005, this hypothesis remains unverified. Close to the pile, at a location known as La Salle César, the existence of a chapel is mentioned in texts and local tradition. This chapel, situated east of the pile and incorporating ancient masonry, was destroyed in 1868 by a "treasure hunter." (Note: Marot 2008a, p. 4: Environnement du site) Other remains, including in-situ masonry, pottery shards, ceramic elements, human bones, and a sarcophagus lid, have been found around the pile, mostly on the slope and occasionally in the valley. (Note: Bèche 1999, p. 10: Environnement éloigné) This abundance suggests a long history of human occupation in the area, but the lack of precise data has limited the identification of specific sites. (Note: Marot & Marlet 2005, pp. 174–175: Informations orales et prospections)

The archaeologists who conducted the 2005 excavation campaign believe that the funerary complex at the site was likely associated with a villa whose owner or family commissioned its construction. According to this hypothesis, the habitation, which has not yet been located, should be close to the pile, possibly further north on the plateau. (Note: Marot & Marlet 2005, pp. 83–84: Nouvelles questions et perspectives)

== Chronology and function ==
=== A long-controversial origin and purpose ===
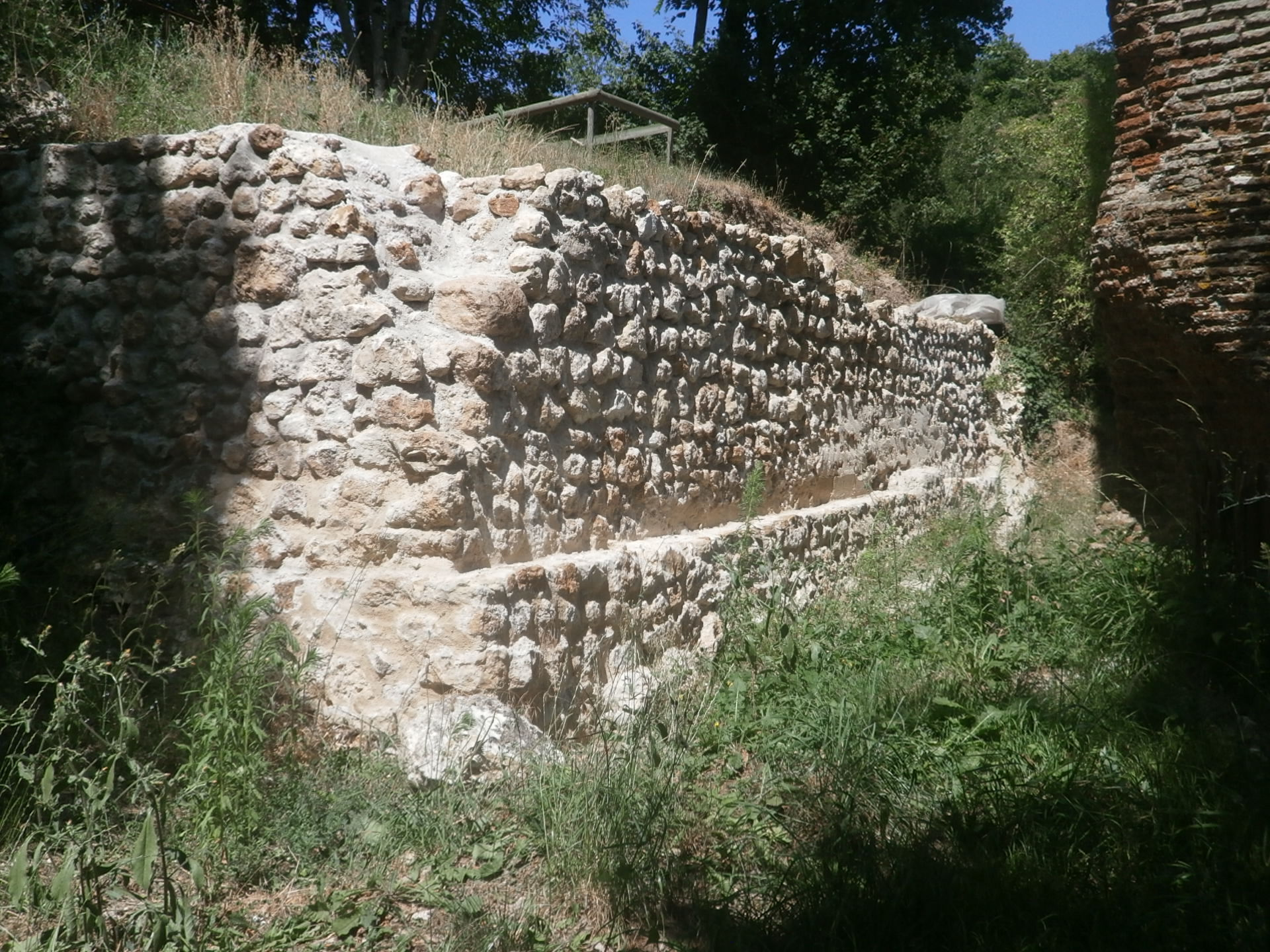
Antique podium to the north of the tower being restored by Les Amis de la Pile association.

For almost five hundred years, authors and historians have attributed various functions to the pyramids, with some suggesting a single purpose and others viewing them as multi-functional monuments. Dating proposals for the monument, which are closely linked to its intended function, vary widely. Some hypotheses are considered plausible, while others are dismissed as "delirious."

The mound has been interpreted as a territorial boundary or marker by Jacques-Antoine Dulaure, (Note: Meffre 1844, p. 182) who suggests it represents the evolution of architectural styles from the Barbarians to the Egyptians and Greeks. Jean-Louis Chalmel, in 1821, believed it delineated the boundary between Frankish and Visigothic territories. (Note: Audin 1977, p. 351) However, Louis de La Saussaye strongly opposes this idea, stating, "Despite Chalmel's credibility on other topics, he lacks the necessary expertise to identify ancient monuments." According to La Saussaye, if the mound is indeed a boundary marker, it must be ancient and signify the limit between the Andecavi and Turones territories.

Until the 20th century, most scholars considered the pile to be a "funerary monument" in a broad sense, encompassing various interpretations. In 1681, Michel de Marolles described it as a monument marking the tomb of "five brave" men from the Roman era. In 1977, Gilbert Picard suggested that graves, yet to be discovered, may exist within the enclosure surrounding the pile. Jean-Mary Couderc, in 1987, mentioned a mausoleum commemorating a 2nd-century merchant engaged in trade with the Ostia region.

Another widely held belief is that the pile is a military trophy. This perspective was shared by La Sauvagère in 1770, who drew parallels between the Cinq-Mars pile and other similar structures in Gaul that were erected to honor Roman warriors after the Gallic Wars. He also suggested that it could have been built to commemorate a Roman consul and friend of Caesar, Quintus Marcius, which could explain the toponym Cinq-Mars. The construction of the pile is believed to be connected to the revolt of Sacrovir in the year 21, which was suppressed by Tiberius and involved the Turones. Some believe that it may also symbolize the end of Norman raids in the Loire Valley in the 10th century.

The pile is also considered a building with a religious purpose, either a temple dedicated to Mars or Mercury, or an astronomical monument built by the Celts. The twelve decorated panels symbolize the twelve months of the year and the twelve signs of the Zodiac. However, La Saussaye dismisses this suggestion, noting that the panel decorations are typically "Roman." Philippe Lauzun suggests a legal function for the piles in general, likening them to “temples where justice was administered, serving as open-air praetoria.”

The pile is considered a navigational landmark associated with the Loire River. It is featured in the French edition of Mercator's atlas from 1609 (folio 151) as Pile Saint-Nicolas, dedicated to the patron saint of boatmen. An 18th-century text describes it as a beacon marking the confluence of the Cher and Loire rivers, despite the impossibility of reaching the top to light a fire. Additionally, the confluence area was not originally located opposite the pile but further downstream. Some authors attribute the pile's construction to a shipowner who supposedly traveled to Rome via waterways, including the Loire, but this theory is not universally accepted.

Some historians, unable to determine the role of the monument, have proposed various dates for its construction. The attribution of the pile's construction to Julius Caesar in a text from 1589 does not surprise La Saussaye, as it was common at that time to attribute any ancient building to the Roman general. The Count of Caylus, on the other hand, believes the pile cannot be ancient because its decoration features heraldry that he considers too recent; therefore, he does not mention this monument in Recueil d'antiquités égyptiennes, étrusques, grecques et romaines. Noël Champoiseau dates its construction to the time of the Alans (5th century), while La Sauvagère, before suggesting it as a monument of the Visigoth era, suggests a construction during the Saracen invasions.

=== Achievements and uncertainties in the 21st century ===
==== Site chronology ====
The 2005 research did not reveal any human presence on the site before the construction of the upper terrace.

The complex is likely datable to the 2nd or 3rd century. This hypothesis is based on the examination of the pile's decorations, which are similar to those used near Rome in the second half of the 2nd century. Additionally, the discovery of two coins from Marcus Aurelius in the 19th century and artifacts (pottery elements) found in the construction fill of the podium support this dating. (Note: Marot & Marlet 2005, p. 58: Réexamen de la date de construction) The upper terrace may have been developed in the second half of the 2nd century or the early 3rd century, (Note: Marot & Marlet 2005, p. 109: Diagramme stratigraphique) with the pile's construction following shortly after, in the late 2nd or early 3rd century. An archaeomagnetic analysis conducted in 2007 on the pile's bricks confirms this date range. (Note: Marot 2008a, p. 34: Datation archéomagnétique)

The site underwent a period of looting and destruction, possibly as a result of a fire that may have occurred between 230 and 380, (Note: Marot 2008a, p. 21: Bâtiment semi-excavé (Str. 3)) leading to its abandonment. The southern wall of the podium has suffered significant erosion, likely due to the pressure of the soil it holds, hastening erosion on the southern part of the terrace. Over time, natural erosion and potentially agricultural activities have gradually erased all evidence of the ancient ground levels since the early Middle Ages.

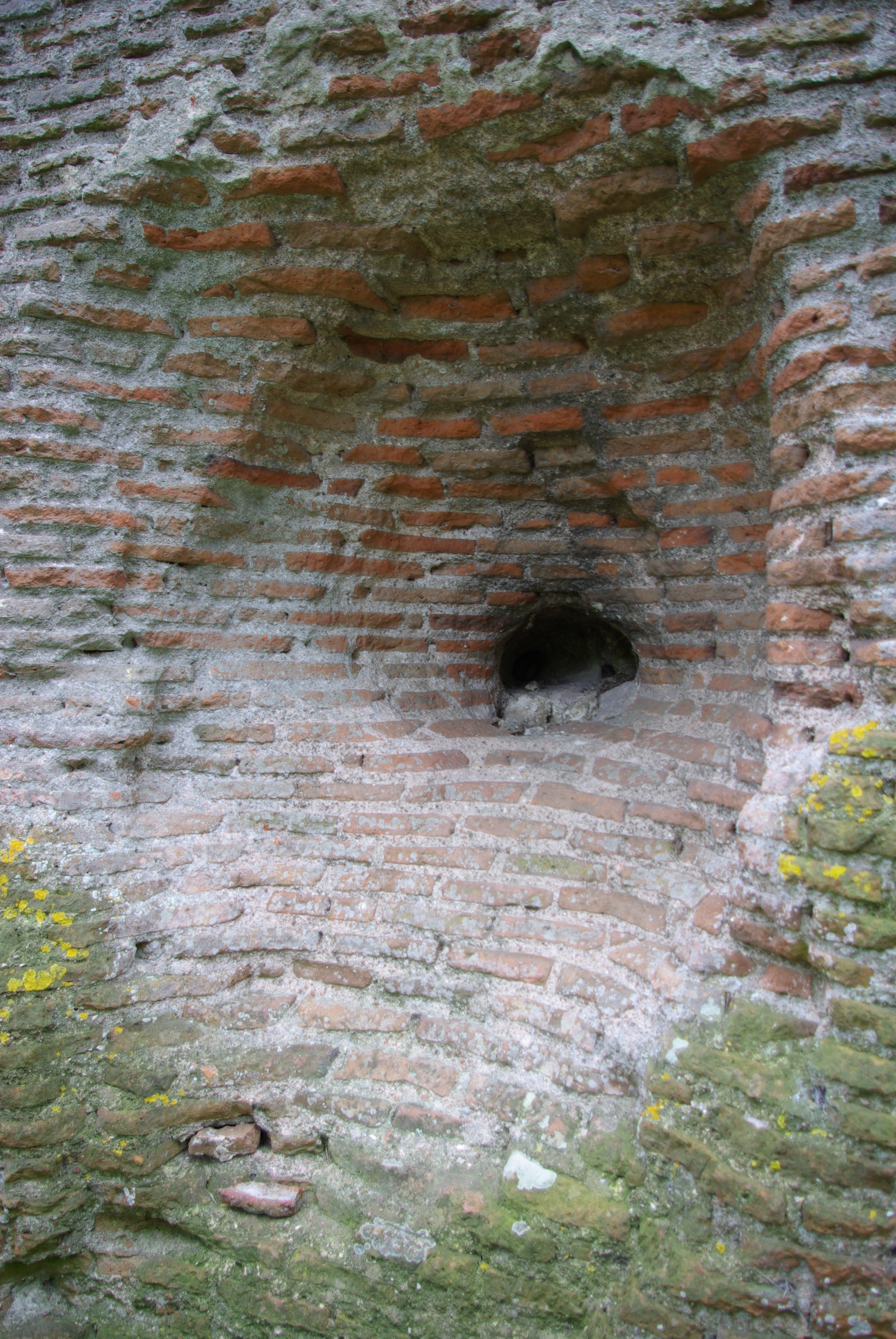
Excavation caused by a “wild dig”, showing the internal structure of the pile.

The history of the site and the pile up to the 19th century is poorly documented. There are no mentions of any interventions on the monument in writings from that time. Some unauthorized excavations by pseudo-archaeologists or looters may have occurred during this period, but there is no concrete evidence to confirm this. (Note: Marot & Marlet 2005, p. 18: Historique des recherches) The damage they caused is still visible on the brick walls of the pile, particularly on the panels decorating the south face.

On September 19, 1830, during the enthronement of Louis-Philippe, a French flag was placed at the top of the terminal pyramid in the presence of the prefect of Indre-et-Loire. It was accompanied by a lead booklet explaining the reasons for this addition. (Note: The booklet contained the following text: “Cinq-Mars-la-Pile * Prefect, M. d'Entraigues * Sub-prefect, M. Desvarennes * Today XIX September MCCCCCCCCXXX, the tricolor flag was placed at the top of this monument in honor of the accession to the throne of H.M. Louis-Philippe, King of the French. * This memorable day was celebrated with joy and gratitude by the inhabitants of this commune and a significant number of visitors with repeated cries of Long live the King of the French. * And was placed by the care of MM. Roux, Lespagnol René, Martin Joseph, and others. * M. Allain, mayor; M. Chivert, deputy; 1830.” (Note: Meffre 1844, p. 188)) Concurrently, archaeological excavations were carried out at the base of the pile. Significant restoration work was undertaken in 1843-44, including filling cavities created by unauthorized excavations, reinforcing the support of the lower terrace, and replacing severely degraded modillions that supported its crown. During this restoration, only six corbels per face were reinstalled, with a 45° angled corbel in each corner replacing two right-angled modillions. The lower terrace was also leveled, and retaining walls were constructed to protect the pile at this level. Unfortunately, this operation disturbed the site's stratigraphy, preventing further understanding of its history. (Note: Marot & Marlet 2005, p. 62: Aménagements tardifs)

A new phase of restoration in 1913 focused on the pile's crowning, restoring its original appearance with eight corbels per face made of Tercé limestone. (Note: Bèche 1999, p. 28: Architecture) Bricks inserted between the corbels were replaced, and a weakened pilaster was dismantled and reassembled. Cavities in the walls were filled, and the flag and lead booklet honoring Louis-Philippe, installed at the pyramid's point in 1830, were removed. (Note: Bèche 1999, p. 92: Les recherches faites aux xixe et xxe siècles) A document details all the work carried out during this restoration in the summer of 1914, including the use of copper clamps to consolidate the decorative panels. (Note: Bordeaux & Seigne 2006, pp. 141–142: Les travaux de restauration de l'été 1914) The bases of the pilasters were repaired and reinforced in 1996.

In 2014, nine years after the excavations that revealed the north terrace walls and four years after the site's tourist development, reconstruction of the podium walls commenced. By the end of 2015, the core of the southern section was built using opus incertum, while the exterior facing in small apparatus, similar to the original, had not been completed yet.

==== Funerary function ====
The recent research findings, including the discovery of the podium, building, and statue, highlight the need to consider the pile site as a unified entity and suggest a holistic approach. The construction of the podium, which involved significant effort, indicates the builders' deliberate intention to create a theatrical setting for the site's different elements. Additionally, the deliberate choice to not align the pile with the podium building, thereby ensuring an unobstructed view from the valley, likely reflects a strategic decision rather than a coincidence, especially if we consider a two-phase construction hypothesis. (Note: Marot 2008a, p. 35: Fonction et destination des édifices)

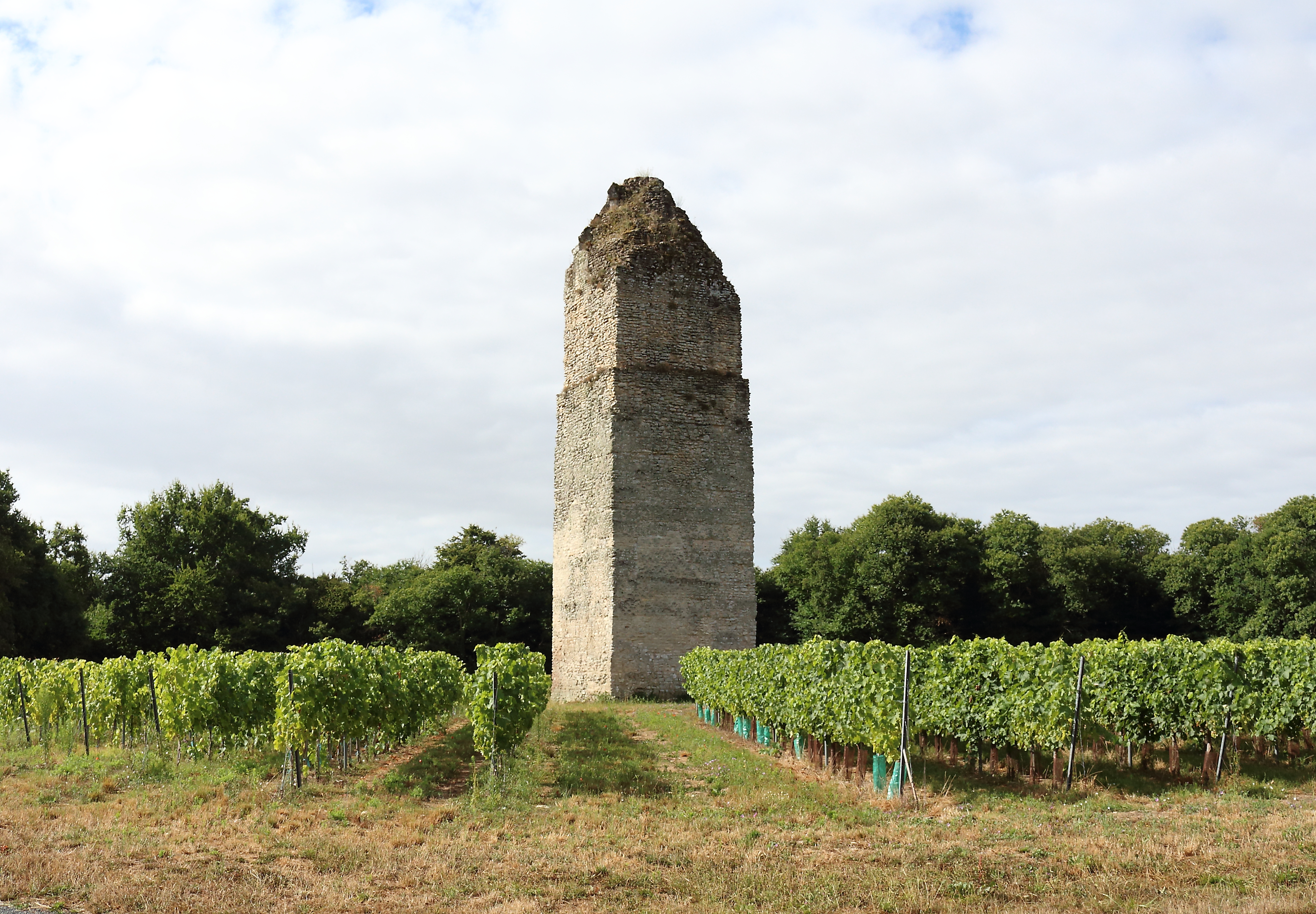
Tour de Pirelonge, Saint-Romain-de-Benet (Charente-Maritime).

It is plausible to interpret the site as a funerary complex rather than just a sanctuary dedicated to a deity, similar to other sites in Aquitaine. The mausoleum-like structure of the building suggests that it may be the tomb of a Turon or Roman dignitary. It is also possible that the person honored by the site is buried elsewhere, with the building serving as a cenotaph to perpetuate their memory. (Note: Marot 2008a, p. 38: Fonction et destination des édifices) Unlike some structures in the Southwest that contain graves within an enclosure, the Cinq-Mars pile may be linked to a tomb or cenotaph but built outside the podium's enclosure. (Note: Marot 2008a, pp. 36–37: Fonction et destination des édifices) In this scenario, the main building on the site would be the small structure on the podium, possibly a mausoleum or cenotaph. The construction of the pile, following the north terrace and its building, would have been intended to mark its location more prominently.

The presence of a statue depicting a prisoner of war may also suggest that the site served a military trophy function, with the individual it honors being renowned for notable military achievements. However, it is not confirmed whether the building and possibly the statue were commissioned by the same benefactors, whether the dignitary or his descendants. The only certainty is that they were associated with an elite group, either Roman or of local origin, (Note: Marot 2008a, p. 40: Fonction et destination des édifices) heavily influenced by Roman culture. (Note: Marot 2008a, pp. 85–86: Conclusion)

The funerary site of the pile may be just one component of a larger complex, which could include the residence of the person who commissioned it, their family, and other structures related to agricultural activities. It is also plausible to posit that additional structures, such as brickmakers' kilns, may have been constructed in the same area in conjunction with the construction of the pile. However, further excavation at the monument's base has not revealed any significant findings, likely due to deep stratigraphic disturbances on the south side and previous excavations on the north side.

== Archaeological studies and mentions ==
This non-exhaustive list aims to highlight the main references and studies that demonstrate the evolution of knowledge about the pile and its immediate surroundings.

The pile was first mentioned in 1534 by Rabelais, who, as a close neighbor, referred to it in Gargantua, XV, as "the Saint Mars pile near Langeais." In the world of gigantism typical of his work, the mention of the pile highlights its massive and imposing nature. In 1589, Canon Bailly, in the Registre de remembrance du fief de la salle César, credited Julius Caesar with its construction; this marks the first historical reference to the monument.

In the 17th and 18th centuries, various historians debated the Roman origin of the monument. Michel de Marolles, in 1681, supported and elaborated on the legend of the five warriors buried beneath the pile. (Note: Bèche 1999, p. 43: La vision des érudits des xvie, xviie et xviiie siècles)

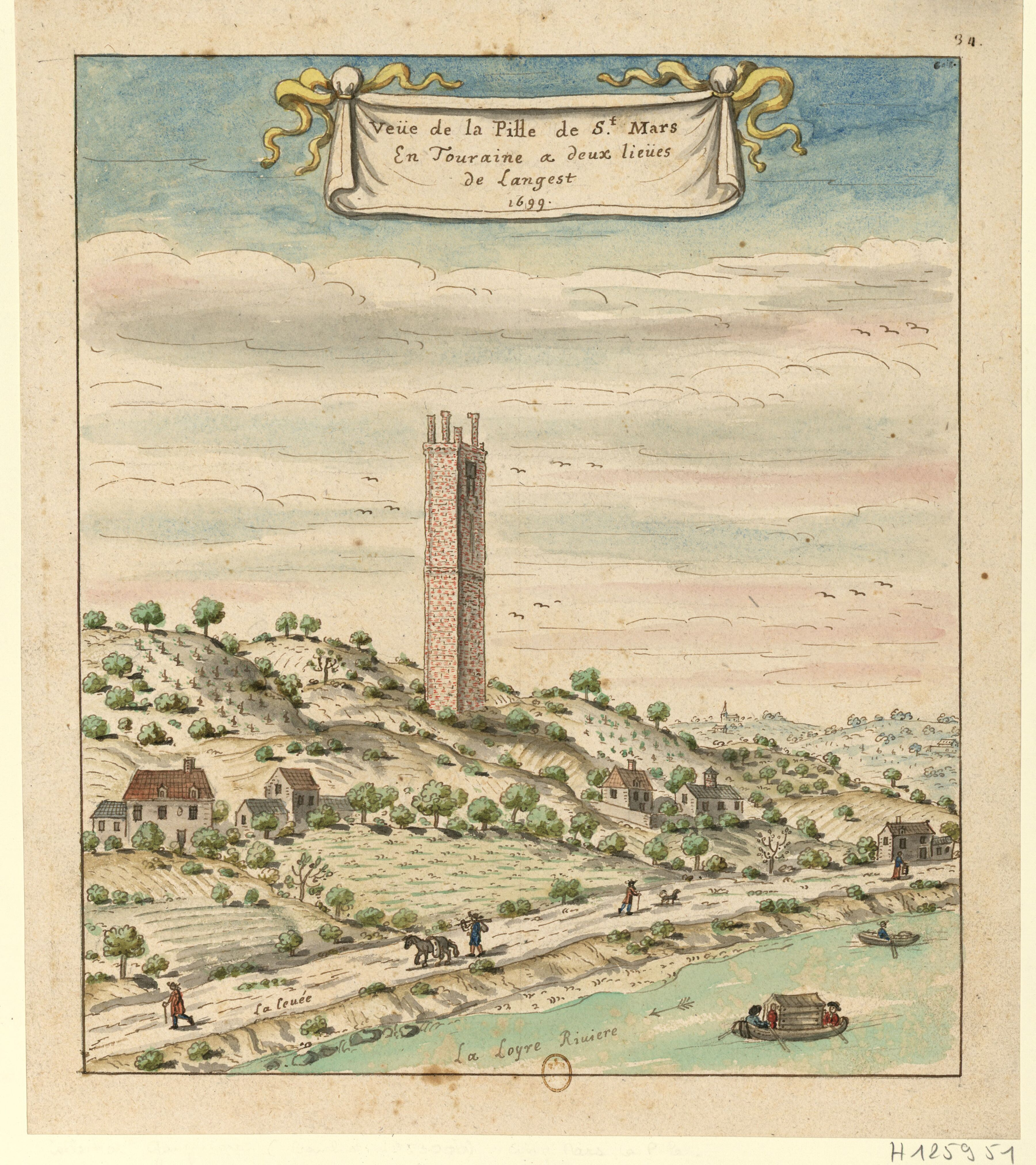
Watercolor of the Cinq-Mars pile. (François Roger de Gaignières, 1699).

Several drawings of the Cinq-Mars pile complement written texts, but the oldest iconographic representation of this monument is François Roger de Gaignières' watercolor, dated around 1699.

In 1770, Félix Le Royer de La Sauvagère published Recherche sur quelques antiquités des environs de Tours, the first detailed study of the building. By gathering existing writings and closely examining the structure with accompanying drawings, he argued convincingly for its Roman origins, dismissing alternative theories about its age.

Louis de La Saussaye conducted a study of the pile in 1835, examining its architectural and historical aspects. He published his findings in Dissertation sur la pile de Cinq-Mars. Although some of his theories regarding the purpose of the pile (such as its potential function as a temple or a structure associated with a temple dedicated to Mars) have been contested, he was the first to observe that the decorative panels numbered twelve, rather than eleven, after a meticulous examination of the structure.

In 1843, three years after its establishment, the Archaeological Society of Touraine (SAT), under the leadership of Henry Goüin, commissioned a team of three members to investigate the date and purpose of the pile's construction. The SAT funded an excavation campaign at the base of the pile and advocated for the sale or donation of the relevant parcels, which were then privately owned, to the general council. This excavation campaign seems to be the only "official" one organized at the site before the 21st century. (Note: Marot & Marlet 2005, p. 17: Historique des recherches) At the same time, a series of restoration works were carried out, although some, such as the reconstruction of the crowning modillions, did not adhere to the original architecture.

After a visit to France, Charles Roach Smith published a paper titled Notes on some of the antiquities of France, observed during a two-week trip in the summer of 1854. In this publication, he dedicated several pages to the Cinq-Mars mound. While the paper did not contribute significantly to the knowledge of the monument, it highlighted the attraction of the structure to travelers and archaeologists, including those from other countries, as evidenced by the pile being featured on the book's cover.

Marie Bèche conducted a thorough study of the pile, its surroundings, and its history in 1999 as part of a master's thesis in archaeology. Although this work was not completely published, many subsequent articles have extensively referenced or quoted it.

In 2005, a significant excavation project concentrated on the area surrounding the monument, specifically the two terraces to the north and south, in anticipation of enhancing the tourist site with amenities (such as stairs, secure pathways, and informative panels). The excavation of the southern terrace yielded disappointing results due to previous disturbances that had disrupted the site's stratigraphy. However, the northern terrace excavation proved to be more successful, uncovering a podium with a building and a statue. This excavation led to a new interpretation of the site's history, viewing the pile as an integral part of its overall context rather than a standalone monument.

In 2006, Patrick Bordeaux and Jacques Seigne conducted a comprehensive review of all known and previously overlooked bibliographic data related to the aqueduct of Luynes. They made several clarifications regarding the architecture and dating of the pile. Despite being aware of Emmanuel Marot's work in 2005, the researchers elected not to incorporate it into their study.

The statue discovered in 2005 was restored in 2007 by Amélie Chedeville-Aubry. In 2009, she published a detailed article on the restoration work in the bulletin of the Société archéologique de Touraine. Emmanuel Marot incorporated the results of this restoration and the new interpretation of the statue into his excavation report a year earlier, revising some of his earlier proposals.

== See also ==
=== Bibliography ===
==== Archaeological and historical studies specific to the Pile de Cinq-Mars ====
- Bèche, Marie (1999). La pile de Cinq-Mars, mémoire de maîtrise en archéologie (in French). Vol. 1 et 2. Tours: Université François-Rabelais. pp. 142 et n.p.
- Bordeaux, Patrick; Seigne, Jacques (2006). "Notes de lecture et de relecture : La pile de Cinq-Mars à travers les archives". Société archéologique de Touraine (in French). LII: 135–142.
- Chédeville, Amélie (2009). "Étude de restauration de la sculpture en tuffeau de Cinq-Mars-la-Pile. iie – iiie siècle, Tours, musée de l'Hôtel Goüin, inv. 2005.029.0001". Société archéologique de Touraine (in French). LV: 43–58.
- Gatian de Clérambault, Édouard (1909). "La pile de Cinq-Mars". Société archéologique de Touraine. 2 (in French). I: 57–67.
- Marot, Emmanuel; Marlet, Olivier (2005). Cinq-Mars-La-Pile (Indre-et-Loire). La fouille des abords de la Pile : rapport de fouilles du 27 juin au 31 juillet 2005 (in French). Conseil général d'Indre-et-Loire, Service archéologique départemental, Université François Rabelais, UMR 6173 CITERES, Laboratoire "Archéologie et Territoires".
- Marot, Emmanuel (2008a). "La pile gallo-romaine de Cinq-Mars-la-Pile (Indre-et-Loire) : réexamen du dossier à la lumière des récentes découvertes". Société archéologique de Touraine (in French). 47.
- Marot, Emmanuel (2008b). "La pile de Cinq-Mars-la-Pile (Indre-et-Loire) : résultats de la fouille de 2005 et dernières hypothèses". Société archéologique de Touraine (in French). LIV: 49–54.
- Meffre, Jacques-Aimé (1844). "Pile Saint-Mars ou Cinq-Mars". Société archéologique de Touraine (in French). II: 180–190.
- Picard, Gilbert (1977). "La pile de Cinq-Mars". Société des Antiquaires de France (in French): 28–33.
- de La Saussaye, Louis (1835). Dissertation sur la pile de Cinq-Mars (in French). Paris: Duverger.

==== Publications partly or wholly devoted to funerary piles and architecture in Roman antiquity ====
- Audin, Pierre (1977). "La pile de Cinq-Mars et les piles gallo-romaines". Annales de Bretagne et des pays de l'Ouest (in French). 84 (3): 351–367. doi:10.3406/abpo.1977.2883.
- Bedon, Robert; Pinon, Pierre; Chevallier, Raymond (1988). Architecture et urbanisme en Gaule romaine: L'architecture et la ville. Les Hespérides (in French). Vol. 1. Paris: Errance. ISBN 2-903442-79-7.
- Bossebœuf, Louis-Auguste (1900). "Les piles romaines". Bulletin de la société archéologique de Touraine (in French). XII, part 2: 175–190.
- Coulon, Gérard (2006). Les Gallo-Romains. Civilisations et cultures (in French). Paris: Errance. ISBN 2-87772-331-3.
- Duby, Georges (1980). Histoire de la France urbaine. L’univers historique (in French). Paris: le Seuil. ISBN 2-02-005590-2.
- Lauzun, Philippe (1898). Inventaire général des piles gallo-romaines du sud-ouest de la France et plus particulièrement du département du Gers (in French). Caen: A. Delesques.
- Provost, Michel (1986). Le Val de Loire et les pays de la Loire à l'époque romaine. Essai de synthèse. Thèse de doctorat d'État (in French). Paris: Université de Paris IV-Sorbonne.
- Le Royer de La Sauvagère, Félix (1770). Recueil d'antiquités dans les Gaules, enrichi de diverses planches et figures, plans, vues, cartes & autres dessins, pour servir a l'intelligence des inscriptions de ces antiquités. Ouvrage qui peut servir de suite aux Antiquités de feu M. le comte de Caylus (in French). Paris: Hérissant le fils. pp. 159–180.
- Seigne, Jacques (2014). "Atlas archéologique de Touraine : Les piles funéraires gallo-romaines" (PDF). Revue archéologique du Centre de la France (in French) (53). Tours: FERACF.

==== Former mention ====
- Rabelais, François (1535). La vie inestimable du grand Gargantua… (in French). Juste.

=== Related articles ===
- Roman funerary practices
- List of French historic monuments protected in 1840

=== External links ===
- Geography resource: Digital Atlas of the Roman Empire
- Architectural resource: Mérimée
- La pile on the town hall website.
