= Tamworth Town Hall =

Municipal building in Tamworth, Staffordshire, England

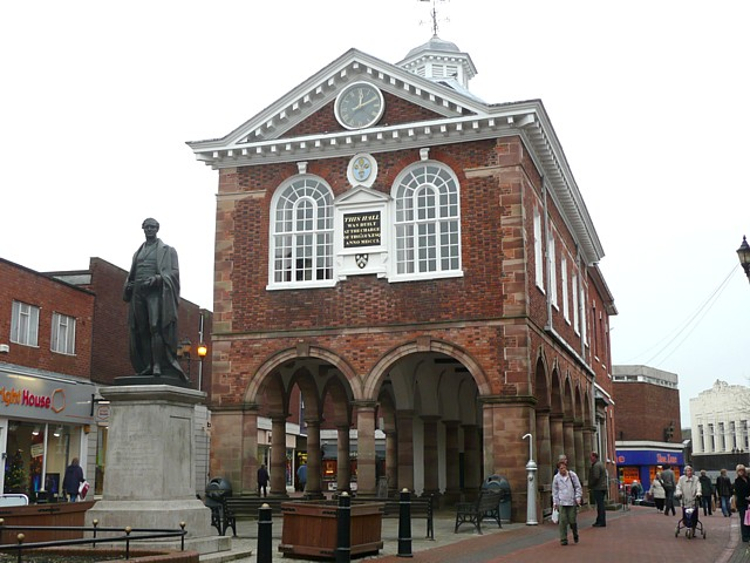
- Tamworth Town Hall

- Shown in Staffordshire
- 52.6330°N 1.6953°W
- Location: Market Street, Tamworth

History
- Built: 1701

Site notes
- Architect: William Gilkes
- Architectural style: Neoclassical style

Listed Building – Grade II*
- Official name: Town Hall
- Designated: 11 May 1950
- Reference no.: 1293012

Tamworth Town Hall is a municipal building in Market Street, Tamworth, Staffordshire, England. The town hall, which is the meeting place of Tamworth Borough Council is a Grade II* listed building.

== History ==
The first town hall was a medieval structure in Market Street which had vaults under the Butter Market. In the late 17th century the local member of parliament, Thomas Guy, who had already funded some local alms-houses decided to finance a new town hall for the town on the same site.

The new building, which was designed in the neoclassical style almost certainly by William Gilkes, was built in red brick with stone dressings at a cost of £1,000 and completed in 1701. The structure consisted of arcading on the ground floor so that markets could be held and 18 Doric order columns which supported a double-cube assembly hall on the first floor. The western elevation featured two arches with archivolts and keystones on the ground floor, two round headed windows on the first floor and a cornice with modillions as well as a pediment above. A plaque was erected between the two windows on the first floor with the words "This hall was built at the charge of Thos. Guy Esq. Anno MDCCI" (1701). A shield bearing Guy's coat of arms was installed below the plaque while the town's coat of arms was erected above it. There was a cupola with a weather vane at roof level. The first meeting of bailiffs and burgesses in the new town hall took place on 20 July 1702.

The building was extended eastward with two extra extra rooms in 1771 and a more substantial extension to the east was completed in 1811. A clock was installed in the pediment on the western front as a gift from the then owner of Tamworth Castle, John Robbins, in 1812. The local member of parliament and future Prime Minister, Sir Robert Peel, during campaigning the forthcoming general election, read his manifesto to the local people at the town hall in December 1834. Peel's basic message was that the Conservative Party "would reform to survive". The area became a municipal borough with the town hall as it headquarters in 1836.

In 1845, a substantial rebuilding of the structure took place. A bronze statue by Matthew Noble depicting Peel standing on an ashlar pedestal was unveiled outside the town hall in 1853. A horse-drawn fire engine was installed in the arcaded area on the ground floor in 1880 and further works were carried out to create a town clerk's office in the late 18th century and a mayor's parlour in the early 19th century.

By the 1880s the council had outgrown the limited office space at the town hall. In 1888 it purchased the White House, an early nineteenth-century house at 21 Church Street, and converted it to become their municipal offices. New assembly rooms and a library were built on the land behind the White House the following year.

Council meetings continued to be held at the town hall, where the main room on the first floor was converted for use as a council chamber in 1934. The town hall and the municipal offices at the White House remained the local seat of government after the old council was reformed in 1974 to become Tamworth Borough Council.

In 1980 the council sold the White House and bought Burlington House in Lichfield Street, a tower block which had been built in 1960. Burlington House was converted to become both the council's offices and main meeting place, opening in May 1981, when it was renamed "Marmion House", after the local Marmion family who were the owners of Tamworth Castle from c.1100 to 1294.

The town hall continued to be used for occasional meetings of the council until 2022, when the council transferred most council and committee meetings back to the town hall as part of plans to dispose of Marmion House.

== See also ==
- Grade II* listed buildings in Tamworth (borough)
- Listed buildings in Tamworth, Staffordshire
