= Amington =

Area of Tamworth, Staffordshire, England

Coordinates: 52.63°N 01.66°W

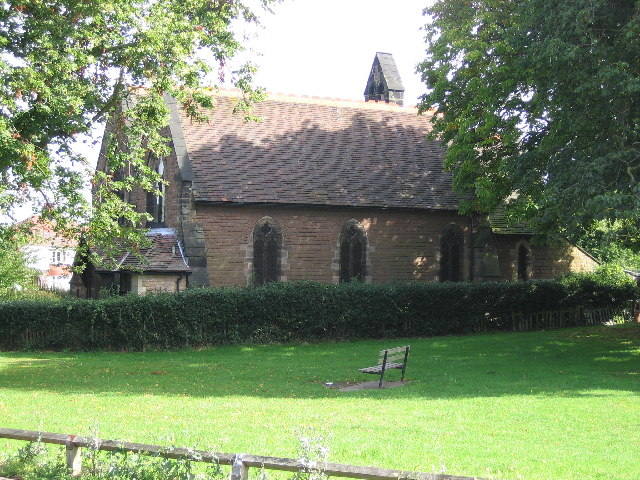

- Location within Staffordshire
- Population: 7,919 (2011.Ward)
- OS grid reference: SK2304
- District: Tamworth
- Shire county: Staffordshire
- Region: West Midlands
- Country: England
- Sovereign state: United Kingdom
- Post town: Tamworth
- Postcode district: B77
- Police: Staffordshire
- Fire: Staffordshire
- Ambulance: West Midlands
- UK Parliament: Tamworth

Amington is an area and suburban village Tamworth in Staffordshire, England. Formerly a distinct village, it is now part of the Tamworth borough, with no gap between it and the neighbouring wards of Bolehall, Glascote, Glascote Heath and Stonydelph. Consisting of both residential and industrial areas, Amington is situated 1.5 miles northeast of Tamworth town centre and borders the North Warwickshire district directly to the east.

== History ==
Amington and Stonydelph formerly formed one "township" and were part of the ancient parish of Tamworth. Amington, now in Staffordshire, was previously part of the county of Warwickshire; the county boundary between Staffordshire and Warwickshire formerly running along Tamworth high street. The village became part of Tamworth Rural District in 1932, thus becoming part of the administrative county of Staffordshire. Amington became a parish on 1 April 1935 being formed from "Amington and Stonydelph". On 1 April 1965 the parish was abolished and merged with Tamworth. In 1961 the parish had a population of 1811.

The village's Parish Church, St. Editha's, is a chapel-of-ease, part of Tamworth Parish. However, as formerly in Warwickshire, Amington church falls under the Diocese of Birmingham, whereas its mother church in Tamworth, also dedicated to St. Editha, is part of the Diocese of Lichfield.

Amington is the site of Amington Hall. On the eve of the English Civil War there was some opposition to the paying of poor rate levies from the local gentry, in particular Cecil Warburton, the occupant of the Hall. The justices at the quarter sessions for Easter, 1642 heard that Cecil Warburton of Hall End, Amington, “did lock up the overseer of the poor (George Payne)…and drew his sword upon him there in a very outrageous manner”.

== Transport ==
Amington is near the Coventry Canal, the River Anker, and also the Trent Valley Line of the West Coast Main Line, all of which pass east/west just to the north of the village.

== Amenities ==
In the village there is one convenience store, a Tesco Express. There is also a post office and a fish and chip shop.

Amington has four pubs: The Gate Inn, The Old Liberal, The Amington Inn and The Winning Post.

In the 1990s two developers built a 1000-home estate in the village which is now known as Amington Fields. In 2006, Antler Homes built a 17-house estate named Ashby Grange.

In 2016 work began on the development of over 1100 new homes on the site of the former Tamworth Municipal Golf Course.

Landau Forte Academy, Amington, one of the high schools in Tamworth, is situated in Amington. The school reached national headlines in 2016 when one of the pupils was recorded being assaulted.

== Local Culture ==
Amington Band are a traditional British brass band based in their own band room. They have been associated with the village since the 1910s.

== See also ==
- Listed buildings in Tamworth, Staffordshire
