= Moat House, Tamworth =

Grade II* listed building in Tamworth, Staffordshire, England

Coordinates: 52°38′2″N 1°42′9″W

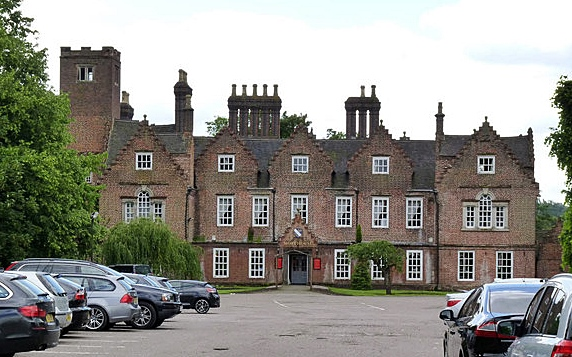
The Moat House

The Moat House is a Grade II* building in Tamworth, Staffordshire, England, in what were once the grounds of Tamworth Castle. The summer house, in the rear beer garden, is a Grade II listed building.

== History ==
Built in 1572 by William Comberford as a family home, it sits on the banks of the River Tame. Charles I stayed in the property in August 1619. A rare family of black swans lived around the grounds.

Having been in the possession of various families for nearly 300 years, it was opened for a local horticultural show and was later used as a private nursing home for twelve people one of whom was cared for while having mental health issues. Immediately prior to its current ownership the property was a Berni Inn, and a Schooner Inn. The house has occasionally been used for filming.

In Summer 2018 the building came under new management and has undertaken restoration and in 2019 opened as an Event and Function venue for Birthday Parties, Wedding Receptions. and in 2020 as a Real Ale Pub, Gin Bar and in 2021 additionally a Cocktail bar.

== See also ==
- Grade II* listed buildings in Tamworth (borough)
- Listed buildings in Tamworth, Staffordshire
