= St Editha's Church, Amington =

St Editha’s Church, Amington
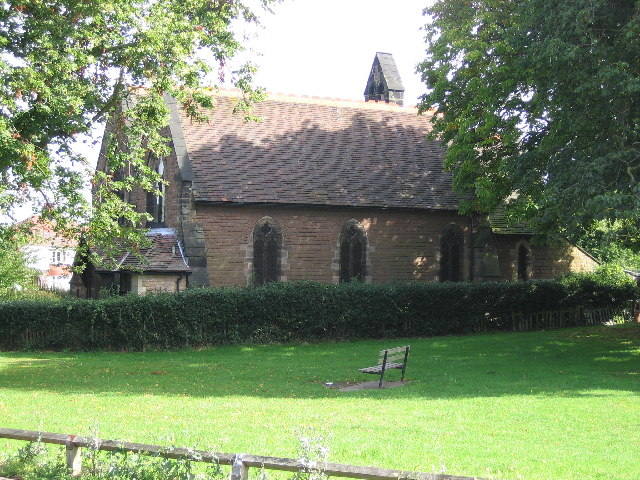
- St Editha’s Church, Amington
- St Editha’s Church, Amington
- 52°38′15.87″N 1°39′15.03″W
- OS grid reference: SK 23533 04519
- Location: Amington, Staffordshire
- Country: England
- Denomination: Church of England
- Website: https://amington.church

History
- Dedication: St Editha

Architecture
- Heritage designation: Grade II listed
- Architect: George Edmund Street
- Completed: 1864

Administration
- Diocese: Anglican Diocese of Birmingham
- Archdeaconry: Aston
- Deanery: Polesworth
- Parish: Amington

Amington Parish Church (dedicated to St Editha) is a Grade II listed parish church in the Church of England in Amington.

== History ==
The church was built in 1864 by the architect George Edmund Street. Edward Burne-Jones noted it for its stained-glass windows.

== Today ==
The church is part of the Diocese of Birmingham, the Archdeaconry of Aston, the Deanery of Polesworth, and the parish of Amington.

Services take place every Sunday at 10:30 a.m. (contemporary) and 6:30 p.m. (sung BCP Evening Prayer), and every other week, there is a BCP Holy Communion service at 8:30 a.m. Additionally, there is a service of Wholeness and Healing on the second Monday of every month at 7:30 p.m.

Every Thursday morning during term-time, the church is open for a Stay Play and Pray group called The Ark.

The church opens every Thursday throughout the year, between 2 pm and 4 pm, as part of the national Places of Welcome scheme.

Full details of all current activities can be found on the church's website.

== Organ ==
The church has an organ which was originally built by George Holdich. A specification of the organ can be found on the National Pipe Organ Register.

== See also ==
- Listed buildings in Tamworth, Staffordshire
