= Bolehall Viaduct =

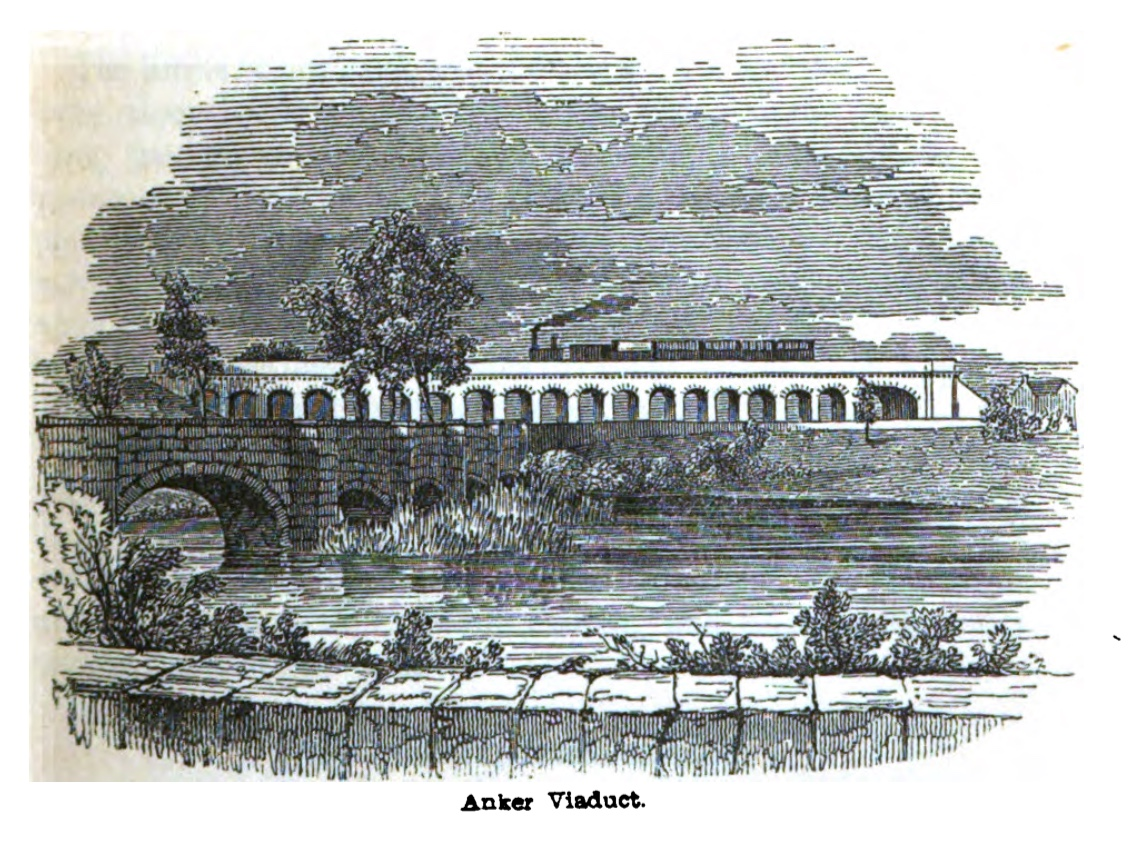
- Anker Viaduct from the Midland Counties' Railway Companion of 1840
- Coordinates: 52°37′50.8″N 1°41′10.5″W
- Carries: Cross Country Route
- Crosses: River Anker
- Locale: Tamworth, Staffordshire
- Official name: Bolehall Viaduct
- Other name: Anker Viaduct
- Maintained by: Network Rail
- Heritage status: Grade II listed

Characteristics
- Total length: 807 ft (246 m)

History
- Opened: 1839

Location
- Interactive map of Bolehall Viaduct

Bolehall Viaduct, also known as Bolebridge Viaduct or the Anker Viaduct, and known locally as the 19 Arches, is a railway bridge in Bolehall, Tamworth, Staffordshire, England. It was designed by George Stephenson and opened in 1839 for the Birmingham and Derby Junction Railway. It remains in use and crosses the River Anker. It is a Grade II listed building.

== History ==
George Stephenson and George Parker Bidder surveyed the route for the Birmingham and Derby Junction Railway (BDJR) and designed Bolehall Viaduct. Stephenson relinquished his position as the railway's chief engineer in favour of his son, Robert Stephenson, when construction work began. The resident engineer was John Birkinshaw, formerly an assistant engineer to the Stephensons on the London and Birmingham Railway. The BDJR issued tenders for the contract in May 1837 and the contracts were let in August 1837. By February 1839 the construction was completed and the ballasting was being prepared for the permanent way. The first engine traversed the viaduct on 1 July 1839 and the first train on 6 July. Passenger services began on 12 August 1839.

== Description ==
The viaduct carries the railway across the River Anker, its shallow valley, and two local roads at Bolehall on the south-eastern edge of Tamworth. It consists of 19 arches—18 segmental arches of 30 feet (9.1 metres) span and one skew arch of 60 feet (18 metres), which crosses a road junction. Arches 6 and 7 from the south-east (Birmingham end) to north-west (Derby end) span the river, arch 10 crosses a road, and the skew arch is number 19. The bridge is 240 yards (220 metres) reaches a maximum height of 45 feet (14 metres). It is built from rock-faced sandstone blocks. It has stepped voussoirs and a substantial cornice which is supported by large, closely spaced modillions and rises to form the bridge parapet. The piers in the river have rounded cutwaters. The abutments at each end are swept forward. Under two of the arches are low stone walls which flank entrance gates.

The viaduct is a Grade II listed building, first designated in November 1972, a status which provides it with legal protection. Its list entry calls it "an important landmark at the south east end of Tamworth". The railway historian Gordon Biddle noted that "what it lacks in height and grace is made up for in a boldly rugged appearance".

== See also ==
- Listed buildings in Tamworth, Staffordshire
