= Maurice Debate =

1918 UK Parliamentary debate

The Maurice Debate was a debate in the British House of Commons which took place on 9 May 1918, during the First World War. A senior British Army officer, Major-General Sir Frederick Maurice, alleged that the War Cabinet had misled Parliament about troop strengths on the Western Front. The leader of the Liberal Party, H. H. Asquith, took up the allegations and attacked Prime Minister David Lloyd George, also a Liberal. The debate ripped apart the Liberal Party. While Asquith's attack was ineffective, Lloyd George vigorously defended his position, treating the debate like a vote of confidence. He won over the House with a powerful, if misleading, speech, rebutting all of Maurice's allegations. The debate did not cause the profound split in the Liberal Party, but did make it more visible and harder to heal. The main results were to strengthen Lloyd George, weaken Asquith, end public criticism of overall strategy, and strengthen civilian control of the military.

== Background to the affair ==
Prime Minister David Lloyd George and those close to him had long grown exasperated by the unreliable statistics produced by the Army about both British and German strength. Cabinet Secretary Maurice Hankey had written in his diary (20 December 1917) "The War office figures and statements are utterly unreliable, and their facts are twisted to support their arguments. If they want men they make out that they can hardly hold the line … If they want to do an offensive they make out that the enemy is exhausted and demoralised, and that they have lots of men".

General Sir William Robertson was removed as Chief of the Imperial General Staff (CIGS – professional head of the Army) in February 1918 after months of argument with the government about manpower and deployment of resources between fronts, and was suspected of engaging in political intrigues to return to power.

Shortly after Robertson's removal, the German Spring Offensive of 21 March 1918 came close to inflicting catastrophic defeat on Hubert Gough's Fifth Army. With the British forces still hard-pressed in April, the causes of the near debacle became a matter of political controversy. Lloyd George felt that Field Marshal Haig had squandered British manpower to little useful effect in his offensives of 1916–17, whilst the British military and their political and press allies felt, not without reason, that the Government had left the BEF starved of men (John Grigg argues that he had been justified in doing so, as Haig had been intending to resume the offensive at the start of 1918). Lloyd George quoted official War Office figures in a speech in the House of Commons on 9 April 1918, stating that the BEF had been stronger on 1 January 1918 than a year previously (the eve of the German offensive in March might have been a better comparison than January, in John Grigg's view). Lloyd George also said that there had been only one "white" division in Mesopotamia and three in Egypt and Palestine, the rest of the divisions in those theatres being Indian divisions containing only a small proportion of British troops.

Maj-Gen Maurice, a long-standing protégé of Robertson's, was now in his final weeks as Director of Military Operations (DMO). He paid a visit to Haig's GHQ in France (where he was offered, but apparently declined, a staff position) and recorded (15 April) that officers at Haig's staff were dissatisfied with Lloyd George's speech of 9 April.

On 18 April a Liberal backbencher asked whether Lloyd George's figures included non-combatants (e.g. labourers, many of them Indian, Chinese or black South Africans, who built roads and railways and helped to move heavy equipment). Ian Macpherson, Under-Secretary at the War Office, replied using figures from the Adjutant-General's Department, sent by Colonel Walter Kirke, Deputy DMO (Maurice was still technically DMO until 20 April).

On 22 April a weekly summary from the same department informed the War Office that the Germans had had a rifle superiority of 330,000 at the start of the year. Lloyd George was furious at this contradiction of his own 9 April figures and the 18 April figures used by Macpherson. He wrote an angry letter to Milner (Secretary of State for War), calling the figures "extraordinarily slipshod". The German superiority was then pared back to 262,000 by including troops in Italy in the British total.

Then on 23 April came questions in the House to the Conservative Leader Bonar Law (the Conservatives were supporting Lloyd George's coalition government) about how Gough's Army had been thinly stretched after taking over a section of French line earlier in 1918. Law replied somewhat disingenuously (see below) that Haig and Philippe Pétain (French Commander-in-Chief) had agreed the extension of the British sector to Barisis between themselves, rather than being leant on by the Supreme War Council at Versailles. The Morning Post was calling openly for the fall of the government at this stage.

== Maurice's letter ==
Maurice had a meeting with Robertson on 29 April. From the context (letters from Robertson 29 and 30 April) it is clear that Robertson suggested writing to Henry Wilson, Robertson's successor as CIGS, and then, if necessary to the press. Robertson initially suggested he speak to Liberal leader and former prime minister Asquith, but Maurice did not do so (in Grigg's view Asquith probably would have advised against going to the press), and Robertson changed his mind later the same day.

Robertson encouraged Maurice to write the letter, but did not back him openly, causing Lloyd George's biographer John Grigg to conclude, "Robertson is the person who comes worst out of the affair." There is, however, little evidence to confirm Lloyd George's suspicions of a wider plot involving senior military and political figures, to bring down the government.

Maurice wrote to Wilson on 30 April. Wilson did not reply to Maurice's letter. There is no evidence of Wilson's views, or whether he launched any inquiry of his own about the different figures being produced. However, Hankey later told Liddell Hart in 1932 that he had a friendly conversation with Maurice on the eve of his press letter, telling him that Lloyd George thought highly of him and suggesting a number of suitable jobs for him; Grigg speculates that the conversation might have been at Wilson's behest after Maurice's letter to Wilson, and that the staff post in France (which he had declined on 15 April) might have been one of the mooted jobs.

Maurice composed his letter to the press on 2 May but did not yet send it. Robertson wrote to him on 4 May, writing that not too much credence should be given to imminent predictions of Lloyd George's downfall, that Maurice should take especial care to get his facts exactly right, and adding: "You are contemplating a great thing – to your undying credit".

Maurice wrote to Asquith (6 May) saying he had decided against seeing him as it would be forcing Asquith to take responsibility for the letter, and Maurice wanted to take all responsibility himself.

== Maurice's allegations ==
Maurice's letter appeared in The Times on 7 May. The letter also appeared in The Morning Post, the Daily Chronicle and The Daily News. The Daily Telegraph refused to print it.

In his letter, Maurice wrote that ministers in the coalition government of Prime Minister David Lloyd George and Unionist Party leader Bonar Law, had given false information to Parliament about the strength of British troops on the Western Front to cover up the fact that the number of British troops there had been reduced following Lloyd George's decision (against military advice) to send additional forces to Palestine. In his letter he accused both Bonar Law and Lloyd George of misleading the House. As Thomas Jones put it, Maurice challenged:

statements ... made by Lloyd George in the House of Commons on 9 April: first, that notwithstanding the heavy casualties in 1917, the army in France was considerably stronger on 1 January 1918 than on 1 January 1917, and second, that in Egypt and Palestine there was a very small proportion of British as compared with Indian troops; and by Bonar Law on 23 April that the extension of the British Front which took place before the battle of 21 March was an arrangement made solely by the military authorities.

The government's statements indicated that the British forces on the Western Front were adequate, and therefore implied that the near-defeat inflicted by Germany in March was the responsibility of General Headquarters.

Maurice wrote that his letter was "not the result of a military conspiracy" and had been "seen by no soldier" (a dubious claim, as he had in fact conspired with Robertson). He said that he was as "sincere a democrat as the Prime Minister" but that "My duty as a citizen must override my duty as a soldier".

== Reaction to the letter ==
Wilson mentioned to the War Cabinet on the morning of Maurice's letter that he had “heard from Maurice” but did not mention the contents of Maurice's letter, nor that he had apparently not replied to it. To add further to the statistical confusion, the War Office now supplied yet another set of figures (7-8 May). These now showed that the BEF had been inferior to the German forces opposite by "only" 100,000 combatants. To Lloyd George's irritation, these figures treated artillerymen, machine gunners and tank crews as non-combatants.

Asquith tabled a private notice question and Bonar Law, on behalf of the government, offered to establish a Court of Honour consisting of two judges to look into the matter. Asquith would have been free to choose the judges, but he thought the proposal insulting to the independence of Parliament and declined the offer on the evening of 7 May. Instead Asquith demanded a Select committee to inquire into the allegations and pressed for a Parliamentary debate.

On 8 May 1918 Howell Arthur Gwynne, editor of The Morning Post, wrote to Asquith admitting that he was a long-standing political enemy of his, but that it was in the national interest that he be restored as Prime Minister in Lloyd George's place.

The letter provoked serious concern in the press both on the substantive issue of the right levels of manpower on the Western Front and their adequate support and because of the allegation that MPs had been misled. However, on 8 May the Times editorial likened the letter's innuendos, such as that it “had been seen by no soldier” whereas Maurice had in fact conspired with Robertson, to the very sort of “disingenuous Parliamentary answer” which Maurice professed to deplore. Grigg argues that Maurice claimed to be acting for the sake of Army morale, yet his actions were likely to worsen it by sowing discord, and that it is more plausible that he was hoping to bring down the government.

As with the Fall of Robertson earlier in the year, Asquith's vanity and resentment at having been deposed as Prime Minister (by Lloyd George, in December 1916) made it impossible for him to stay entirely aloof, especially with his wife and his political associates egging him on. However, he was conscious of his own lack of stomach for the fight and others’ lack of appetite for his return. On the eve of the debate The Westminster Gazette, edited by his friend and future biographer J. A. Spender, had climbed down from its previous position of calling for the fullest possible investigation of Maurice's allegations, and instead called for national unity.

Maurice did not stay in London to coach those ready to attack ministers.

== The debate ==
On the morning of 9 May The Times carried a report of a speech by G. H. Roberts, Minister of Labour, complaining of constant "sniping" at the government, a phrase which Lloyd George would use in his peroration.

Asquith rose to speak at about 3.45 pm. His performance in the debate was thought to be dry, formal and pedantic. According to his biographer, "... there was no sense of a great Parliamentary occasion about his speech. He had chosen a minor key and he had played it without his usual sureness of touch." He concentrated on explaining why he was calling for a select committee and insisted that he was not seeking to displace the government. He had no answer when a heckler suggested that setting up a select committee had not worked over the Marconi scandal. At one point he asked rhetorically "What is the alternative?" and as he paused for effect Charles Stanton, the pro-war independent labour MP for Merthyr Tydfil, shouted "Get on with the war!" to cheers and laughter. Even Asquith's friends saw that he had lost his fighting spirit and would not be acceptable as a wartime Prime Minister.

Lloyd George guessed, largely correctly, that the whole affair had been stirred up by General Robertson. He also sensed that Asquith had lost the will to rule. He had had Hankey prepare a brief, using the War Office figures of 18 April, not the DMO figures of 22 April, which had since been heavily amended, or the final set of DMO figures from 7 to 8 May. Whether or nor his statement on 9 April had been honest, a claim accepted by some historians, there is no doubt that he spoke dishonestly in the debate a month later. Lloyd George spoke for one and a quarter hours, twice as long as Asquith. He was direct and combative. He treated the issue as if it were a vote of confidence in the government and rebutted Maurice's charges in a powerful, if misleading speech, based on doubtful material. He pointed out that Asquith had not set up a select committee of the House of Commons over the disastrous Kut Campaign (he had instead set up an independent inquiry).

Lloyd George attacked Maurice, pointing out that his letter constituted a breach of King's Regulations. Lloyd George pointed out that the figures which the Government had presented to the House on 18 April, showing an increase in the number of BEF "combatants" between 1 January 1918 and 1 January 1917, had technically come from Maurice's department. He admitted, in response to an interruption, that Maurice had not actually seen the 18 April figures (he had been away at the time) but they had been initialled by a deputy (Colonel Walter Kirke). The figure of three "white" divisions in Egypt/Palestine had been given at a Cabinet meeting at which Maurice had been in attendance. Furthermore, he argued that Maurice's statement that he had been at Versailles where the extension of the British line had been agreed was misleading – Maurice had been in Versailles but not at the Supreme War Council, and the issue had not been discussed there but had already been agreed between Haig and Pétain.

Lloyd George also reminded MPs that the debate might bring down the Government and restore Asquith as Prime Minister, urging them to "Make no mistake!" Lloyd George was judged to have demolished the charges Maurice had laid against him. One commentator, Dingle Foot, noted that "at the time it appeared that Lloyd George had completely routed his critics."

Hankey listened to Lloyd George's "superb parliamentary effort" from the gallery, although he thought it "not the speech of a man who tells 'the truth, the whole truth and nothing but the truth'". He recorded that Lloyd George was "discreetly silent" about the Adjutant-General's figures of 22 April which did not show an increase in the combat strength of the BEF. Hankey was asked by MPs of all "complexions" to tell them the real truth of the matter, but supported the Prime Minister in public.

Amongst other speeches of note was that of Edward Carson, who had recently resigned from the government over Irish conscription. The previous day (8 May) Carson had tried to persuade the Unionist Business Committee (Conservative backbenchers) to support neither Lloyd George nor Asquith, but they decided to back the government rather than see Asquith return as Prime Minister or fight an election on an electoral register five years out of date. In his speech Carson pointed out that the House must either support or bring down the government, and that the former was preferable. He supported the government.

By this time further speakers were being interrupted by shouts of "Divide! Divide!", as MPs were keen to move to a vote. Because of the high number of absentees (many MPs were away serving with the forces) less than half the House actually supported the government. However, Parliament had no desire to displace the government and in the vote on the debate the House of Commons divided in support of the Government by 295 votes to 108.

One historian of the Liberal Party has commented that this was a larger majority than had appeared likely. 98 Liberal MPs supported the Asquith motion, 70 Liberal MPs supported Lloyd George's government, while 93 Liberal MPs either abstained or were absent. Labour MPs were also split by the debate with 15 MPs supporting the government, eight supporting Asquith's motion and 12 being either absent or abstaining.

== The validity of Maurice's charges ==
After the debate Lloyd George told George Younger that he had been "caught out telling the truth". Lloyd George chose to disregard any figures provided after 18 April, and as Hankey put it was “discreetly silent” about the Adjutant-General's figures of 22 April (or, for that matter the figures of 7–8 May). Lord Milner later, after the debate, suggested that Lloyd George should issue a correction to the 18 April figures but did not press the point – this suggestion, which John Grigg describes as "politically foolish," contributed to Lloyd George's loss of confidence in Milner as War Secretary.

Lloyd George's figure of 3 "white" divisions in Egypt/Palestine had been given in good faith at the time, but Henry Wilson had since informed him that the correct number was in fact seven (some were redeployed to the Western Front after the German Offensive began on 21 March, replaced by Indian divisions from Mesopotamia).

Bonar Law said on 23 April that the extension of the British line had already been agreed between Haig and Pétain and, in response to a supplementary question from William Pringle, MP for Penistone, declared somewhat ambiguously that "this particular matter" had not been discussed at Versailles. Maurice said in his letter that he had been present at Versailles when the matter had been discussed. In fact the actual extension of the line had been agreed in principle at the political level between Lloyd George and Paul Painlevé (French Prime Minister at the time) in September 1917, and Haig had (somewhat grudgingly) agreed the details with Pétain in October. However, there had then been further pressure from the French that the British take over yet more line, to the displeasure of Lloyd George as well as Haig. The matter was referred to the Supreme War Council at Versailles, who recommended that the BEF take over about half of what the French were demanding. In the event, Pétain did not press the matter and Barisis remained the rightward point of the BEF positions at the time of the German attack on 21 March 1918. It is unclear whether Law was being deliberately evasive.

== Later allegations muddy the waters ==
Whilst Lloyd George was writing his memoirs in the 1930s, his secretary (and mistress) Frances Stevenson made a diary entry which later came to light when Lord Beaverbrook published Men and Power in 1956. Beaverbrook wrote that after Lloyd George's 9 April statement J. T. Davies had revealed a War Office correction to her, but had burned the incriminating document in front of her.

Frances (the widowed Countess Lloyd-George as she was by then) wrote to The Spectator (23 November 1956) stating that the incident had in fact occurred some time after the Maurice Debate. She wrote in her autobiography (1967) that on writing her diary entry she had telephoned J.T. Davies who claimed to have "no recollection" of the incident. Nancy Maurice (in her book The Maurice Case p. 174) suggested that Davies had staged the discovery and destruction of the document and made Frances Stevenson his unwilling tool. Grigg points out that even if such an incident did take place, it had no effect on the Maurice Debate itself.

== The impact of the debate ==
Maj-Gen Maurice was put on half-pay on 11 May, and soon retired from the Army. However, he was far from disgraced and shortly became military correspondent of the Daily Chronicle. He later enjoyed a distinguished career as an author and lecturer in military history and as a university administrator. However, he was never officially exonerated. In his memoirs in the mid-1930s Lloyd George was harsh about Maurice and did not come clean about his own disingenuous use of statistics in the debate.

The military writer Repington was also a casualty of the affair, as he had annoyed Milner's disciples by attacking him. On 12 May a two-page editorial in The Observer (written by the editor JL Garvin at the behest of the owner Waldorf Astor) denounced him and his reputation never fully recovered.

The Times newspaper reported that as a result of the debate it now sensed the existence of an organised opposition. This was not the first time that Liberals had voted against the government but it was the first time that Asquith had led the opposition from the front. Thoughts about formalising the Coalition Liberals into a distinct party group now began to take shape. The beginnings of separate Lloyd Georgeite Liberal constituency organisations began to appear. In the summer of 1918 there were talks between Lloyd George's Chief Whip, Freddie Guest and the Conservatives prepared to guarantee Coalition backing for 150 Liberal MPs in the next general election. This was the birth of the coalition coupon and the formal divide in Liberal ranks which took place at the 1918 general election.

At Newcastle on 29 October 1918, with the general election imminent, Lloyd George claimed that the Maurice Debate had determined which of the 159 Liberals received coalition "coupons", but research has shown that this was not strictly true. Lloyd George also talked about the Maurice Debate at length in a speech at Wolverhampton on 23 November 1918.

The Maurice debate may not have been the sole identifying factor for those Liberals granted or denied the coupon but the personal rift between Lloyd George and Asquith was deepened by it. The disunity in the Liberal Party was transparent for all to see, to the clear electoral detriment of the party. By 1924 the Liberal Party had been reduced in Parliament to 40 seats and was never again able to form a government in its own right.

== See also ==
- History of the Liberal Party (UK)
- Douglas Haig, 1st Earl Haig
- Biography of Maurice at Spartacus Educational
