= Charles à Court Repington =

British Army officer and writer (1858–1925)

Lieutenant-Colonel Charles à Court Repington CMG
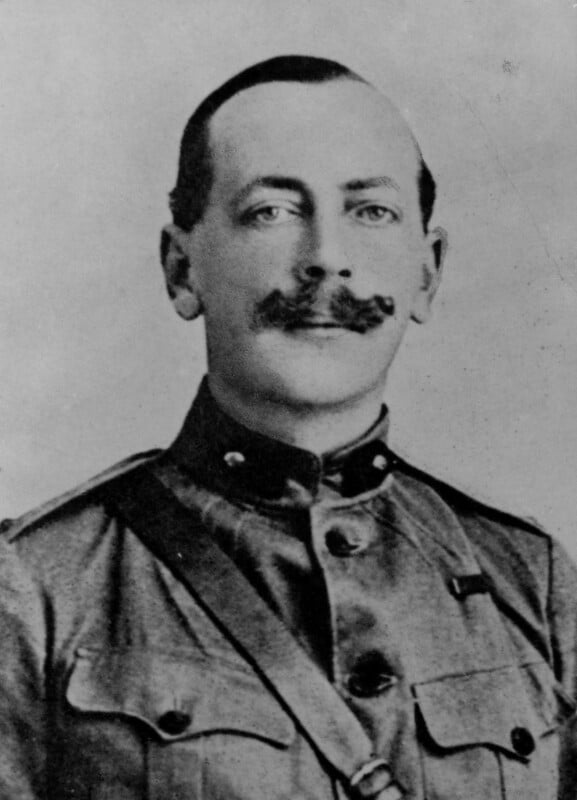
- Repington in 1900–1902
- Born: Charles à Court; 29 January 1858; Heytesbury, Wiltshire
- Died: 25 May 1925 (aged 67); Hove, Sussex
- Military career
- Allegiance: United Kingdom
- Branch: British Army
- Service years: 1878–1902
- Rank: Lieutenant colonel
- Unit: Rifle Brigade
- Conflicts: Second Boer War
- Other work: Writer

Lieutenant-Colonel Charles à Court Repington, CMG (born Charles à Court; 29 January 1858 – 25 May 1925) was a British Army officer and writer. Forced to resign from the army in disgrace in 1902 following the end of the Second Boer War, he went on to have a prominent career as an influential war correspondent during the First World War. Repington is credited with coining the terms "First World War" and "Second World War" and being one of the first people to use the term "world war" in general.

== Early life ==
Charles à Court was born on 29 January 1858 in the Wiltshire village of Heytesbury, the son of the MP Charles A'Court. In his memoir, he later wrote: "The à Courts are Wiltshire folk, and in old days represented Heytesbury in Parliament... The name of Repington, under the terms of an old will, was assumed by all the à Courts in turn as they succeeded to the Amington Hall Estate, and I followed the rule when my father died in 1903." He studied at Eton College and Royal Military College, Sandhurst.

== Military career ==
He commenced his military career as a commissioned infantry officer in 1878 with the British Army's Rifle Brigade. After serving in Afghanistan, Burma, and Sudan, he entered the Staff College at Camberley, where he was a brilliant student, and where his peers included the future senior generals Herbert Plumer and Horace Smith-Dorrien. On graduation from Staff College he served as a military attaché in Brussels and The Hague, following which he was promoted to lieutenant-colonel. He served as a staff officer during the Second Boer War in South Africa 1899–1901, and was appointed a Companion of the Order of St Michael and St George (CMG) during the conflict.

After returning from the war, what had appeared to be a promising military career was cut short during a posting to Egypt in 1902 where Repington re-engaged a romantic affair dating back to the late 1890s with Lady Garstin, the wife of a British official, William Garstin, which became public. He was reprimanded by senior military authorities, as he had given a written promise "upon his honour as a soldier and gentleman" previously to have no further dealings with her. He had given this "parole" to Henry Wilson (a friend of Mary Garstin's late father, who had been asked by her family to get involved) on 9 October 1899. Repington told Wilson – at Chieveley, near Colenso in South Africa, during the 2nd Boer War campaign in February 1901 – that he regarded himself as absolved from his promise to give Mary Garstin up after learning that her husband had been spreading rumours of his other infidelities. During the divorce proceedings, it was revealed that Repington had ignored warnings about his behaviour (i.e. had "broken his parole") and had continued with the affair. Wilson was unable or unwilling to confirm Repington's claim that he had released him from his parole in South Africa. Repington believed that Wilson had betrayed a fellow soldier in this, but was forced to resign his commission and retire from the British Army in social disgrace with the rank of Lieutenant Colonel on 15 January 1902. In a subsequent career as a journalist, specializing in military matters, he was a strong critic of Wilson whenever the opportunity presented itself.

== Military correspondent ==
On returning to London, he took a position as a military correspondent with the Morning Post (1902–1904), and The Times (1904–1918). His reports as a war correspondent from the scene of the Russo-Japanese War in 1904–1905 were later published as a book entitled The War in the Far East. Repington was an advocate of the creation of a larger British Army (at the expense of the then all-powerful, in Edwardian England, Royal Navy), which brought him into conflict with Admiral Fisher). He supported the creation of a British Army General Staff pre-World War I, feared a German "bolt from the blue" (i.e. an attack upon the British Isles by the German Empire before a declaration of hostilities), and was a "Westerner" (i.e., supported during the war the defeat of the German Empire by heavy fighting on the Western Front rather than pursuing an alternative indirect strategy). According to his memoir Vestigia, an unnamed Radical paper once called him "the gorgeous Wreckington", but this was a personal attack in reference to his divorce scandal.

During World War I Repington relied on his personal contacts in the British Army and the War Office for his information, and his early reporting of the war acquired important material from his personal friendship with the first Commander-in-Chief of the British Expeditionary Force, Sir John French, via which he was able to visit the Western Front during the opening moves of the conflict in late 1914, at a time when most of his rival journalists were prohibited by the British Government from going to the war front. Repington appears to be the first person to have used the term "First World War" on 10 September 1918 in a conversation noted in his diary, hoping that title would serve as a reminder and warning that a "Second World War" was a possibility in the future.

=== "Shells Scandal" ===
In May 1915, Repington personally witnessed the failed British attack at Aubers Ridge in Artois, and was particularly moved by the casualties sustained by his old unit the Rifle Brigade in the action. He dispatched a telegram to The Times blaming a lack of artillery ammunition available for the British Expeditionary Force, which, despite being heavily censored, was printed after Sir John French's aide Brinsley Fitzgerald assured him of French's tacit approval. Repington later emphatically denied that French had spoken to him on the issue, but French had in fact supplied Repington with information for the story. The appearance of this story in The Times and later in the Daily Mail, resulted in a political scandal which contributed to the creation of a separate Ministry of Munitions under the future Prime Minister David Lloyd George, and a reduction in the power of the War Secretary Lord Kitchener. Such blatant meddling in politics also damaged the authority of Sir John French as Commander-in-Chief of the B.E.F. and contributed to his enforced resignation from the post at the end of 1915. The affair had given Repington substantial influence over military policy via his newspaper reports, but he was personally temporarily prohibited from visiting the Western Front again until March 1916.

=== Prosecution under the Defence of the Realm Act ===
He resigned from The Times in January 1918 due to a disagreement with its proprietor, Lord Northcliffe, who after the German counterattack at the Battle of Cambrai had distanced himself from Field Marshal Douglas Haig's conduct of the war, and required journalists in his employ to do the same. Repington, unwilling to go along with this editorial policy returned to The Morning Post. On 16 February 1918, as part of the power struggle between Lloyd George (Prime Minister since December 1916) and the Chief of the Imperial General Staff, General Robertson, Repington along with the Morning Post's editor Howell Arthur Gwynne appeared at Bow Street Magistrates' Court charged with having contravened DORA Regulation 18 by publishing articles (on 11 February 1918) disclosing Lloyd George's attempts to bypass Robertson by setting up a rival staff under Henry Wilson at Versailles; Lloyd George's plans to re-focus British military effort away from the Western Front towards defeating the Ottoman Empire, and the Government's failure to keep the British Army on the Western Front up to required troop strength for offensive operations. Repington claimed that the crowd in attendance was the largest since the trial of Dr Crippen, and later claimed that Robertson had told him that he could no more afford to be seen with him than either of them "could afford to be seen walking down Regent Street with a whore". Repington was found guilty and was fined.

Repington was also a casualty of the Maurice Debate. On 12 May a two-page editorial in The Observer (written by the editor J. L. Garvin at the behest of the owner Waldorf Astor) attacked him and his reputation never fully recovered.

== Later life ==
After the end of the war Repington joined the staff of The Daily Telegraph, and subsequently published several books. These works included The First World War (1920), and After the War (1922), which were bestsellers, but cost Repington friendships for his apparent willingness to report what others considered to have been private conversations.

== Death ==
He died on 25 May 1925 at Pembroke Lodge in Hove, East Sussex. He was 67 years old. His body was buried at Hove Cemetery, Old Shoreham Road.

== Personal life ==
On 11 February 1882, Repington married Melloney Catherine (died 1934), daughter of Colonel Henry Sales Scobell, of Abbey House, Pershore, High Sheriff of Worcestershire in 1872; she was a sister of Major-General Henry Jenner Scobell. The marriage produced four children: Charles Edward Geoffrey (1888–1889), (Melloney) Catherine ("Kitty") Isabel (1891–1965), Elizabeth Frances (1892–1950), and Violet Emily (1895–1898); they were judicially separated in 1902. Repington subsequently married Mary North (formerly Lady Garstin), and had a daughter, Laetitia Frances Mary, born in 1911.

== Selected works ==
- 1905 – The War in the Far East, London, J. Murray.
- 1919 – Vestigia, Reminiscences of Peace and War, Boston & New York: Houghton Mifflin Co.
- 1920 – The First World War, 1914–1918, Vol. I & Vol. II, London : Constable & Co.
- 1922 – After the War; London–Paris–Rome–Athens–Prague–Vienna–Budapest–Bucharest–Berlin–Sofia–Coblenz–New York–Washington; a Diary, Boston & New York: Houghton Mifflin Co.

== Sources ==
- Victor Bonham-Carter (1963). Soldier True: The Life and Times of Field-Marshal Sir William Robertson. London: Frederick Muller Limited.
- Holmes, Richard (2004). The Little Field Marshal: A Life of Sir John French. Weidenfeld & Nicolson. ISBN 0-297-84614-0.
- Jeffery, Keith (2006). Field Marshal Sir Henry Wilson: A Political Soldier. Oxford University Press. ISBN 978-0-19-820358-2.
- Reid, Walter (2006). Architect of Victory: Douglas Haig. Edinburgh: Birlinn Ltd. ISBN 1-84158-517-3.
