= Amington Hall =

Coordinates: 52.6492°N 1.6613°W

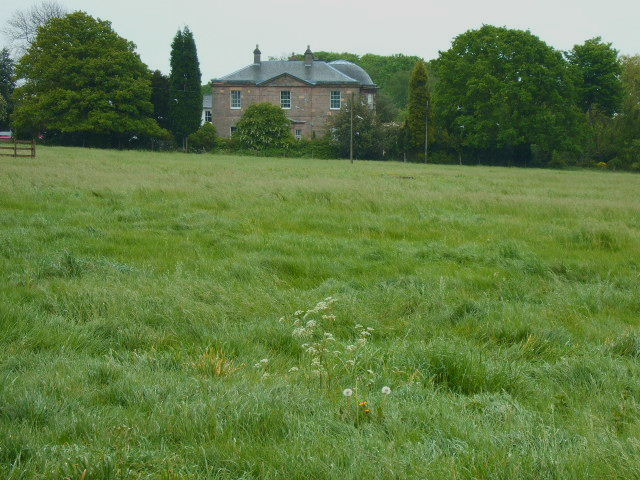

General information
- Town or city: Amington
- Country: England

Design and construction
- Architect(s): Samuel Wyatt

Amington Hall is an early-19th-century former country house at Amington, near Tamworth, Staffordshire, which has been converted into residential apartments.

== History ==
The manor of Amington was anciently owned by the Clinton family. In 1422 William Repington purchased some 1,400 acres (5.7 km^{2}) of land from the Clintons and in 1539 his descendant Francis purchased the manor and remaining land.

The Repingtons replaced the ancient manor house early in the 18th century. This house, later a farmhouse, and now known as Amington Old Hall farmhouse, still stands and is a Grade II listed building.

The Repingtons prospered. In 1617 they acquired the neighbouring manor of Atherstone where they built a new Atherstone Hall.

At Amington they had a new house designed by Samuel Wyatt and built in about 1810 close to the old manor. It is a Grade II* listed building. The two-storey building has an entrance front of three bays, the central bay pedimented and with a Tuscan porch. The unusual garden front has seven bays, of which the central three are bowed to full height and carry a domed roof. The brick rear service wing was added later in the 19th century.

The last of the Repingtons died in 1837 and the estate passed to a cousin Henry à Court. When Charles à Court Repington sold the Hall in 1910 to Sidney Fisher a local paper manufacturer. In 1963 the building was converted into apartments.

== Owners and residents ==
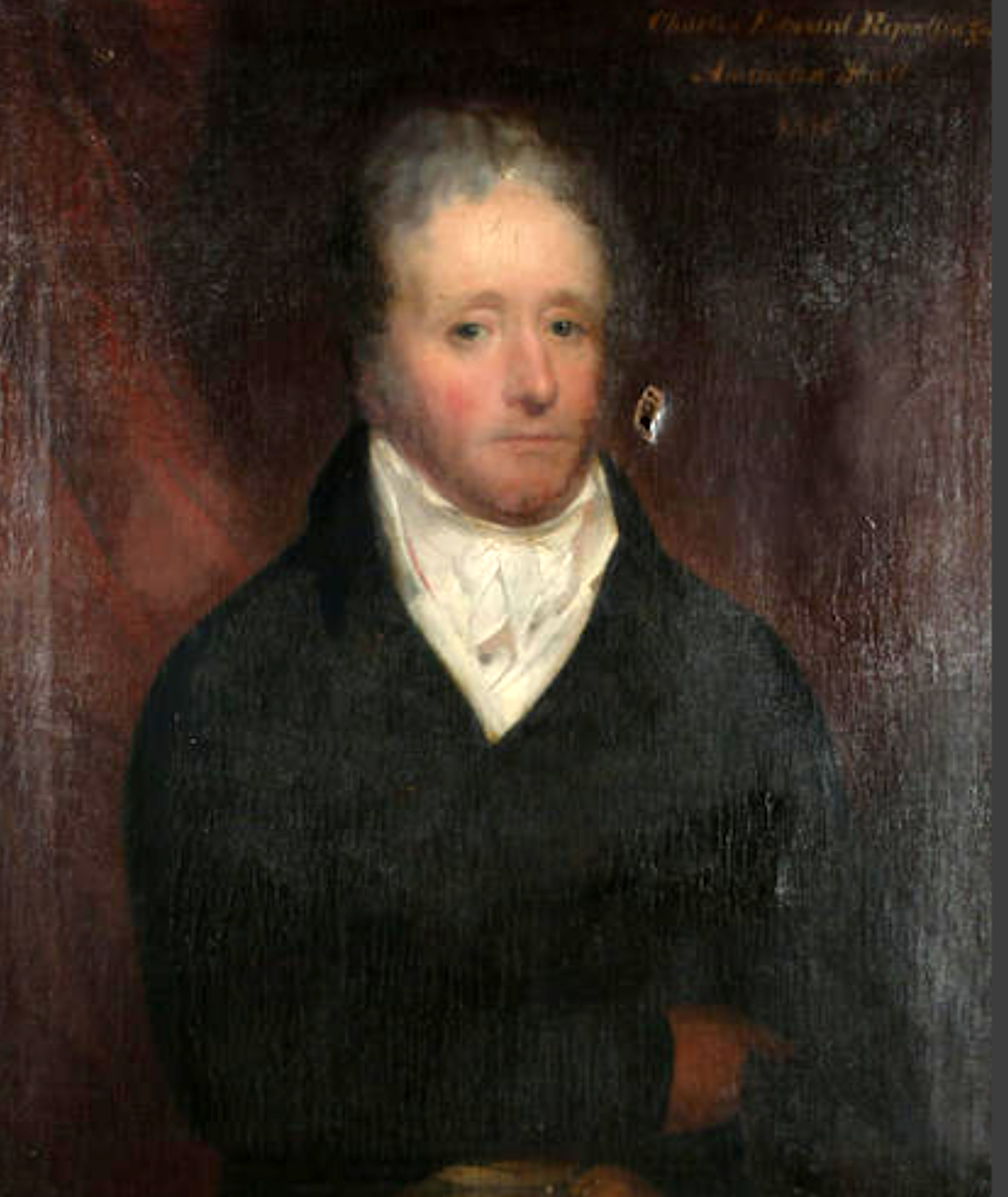
Charles Edward Repington 1810

The Repington family built Amington Hall in about 1810. At this time it was owned by Charles Edward Repington (1755–1837) who inherited the estate in 1764 from his father. At this time there was residence to the south of the present building which still exists and is called Amington Old Hall. Charles was a magistrate and Deputy Lieutenant of Warwickshire. In 1805 he married Catherine Jesse Cholmley (1776–1847), eldest daughter of Henry Fane Cholmley of Whitby and Howsham. However they had no children so when he died in 1837 the Hall was inherited by his relative Edward Henry à Court.

Edward Henry à Court (1783–1855) was the son of Sir William Pierce Ashe A’Court. He took the additional name of Repington after he inherited Amington Hall. In his youth he served in the navy but when his father died in 1817 he received a large allowance and left the military to help manage the family estate in Heytesbury, where he became a Member of Parliament. When he inherited the Hall he became the Member for Tamworth. He did not marry, so when he died in 1855 the property was inherited by his younger brother General Charles Ashe A'Court.

General Charles Ashe A'Court (1785–1861) also added the surname Repington when he became the owner of Amington Hall. He was a British military commander and Member of Parliament. In 1815 he married Mary Elizabeth Catherine Gibbs the daughter and heiress of Abraham Gibbs merchant, of Naples and Palermo. The couple had one son and one daughter. Their daughter was Elizabeth Herbert, Baroness Herbert of Lea who was a famous author of that time. When he died in 1861 his son Wyndham à Court Repington became the owner.

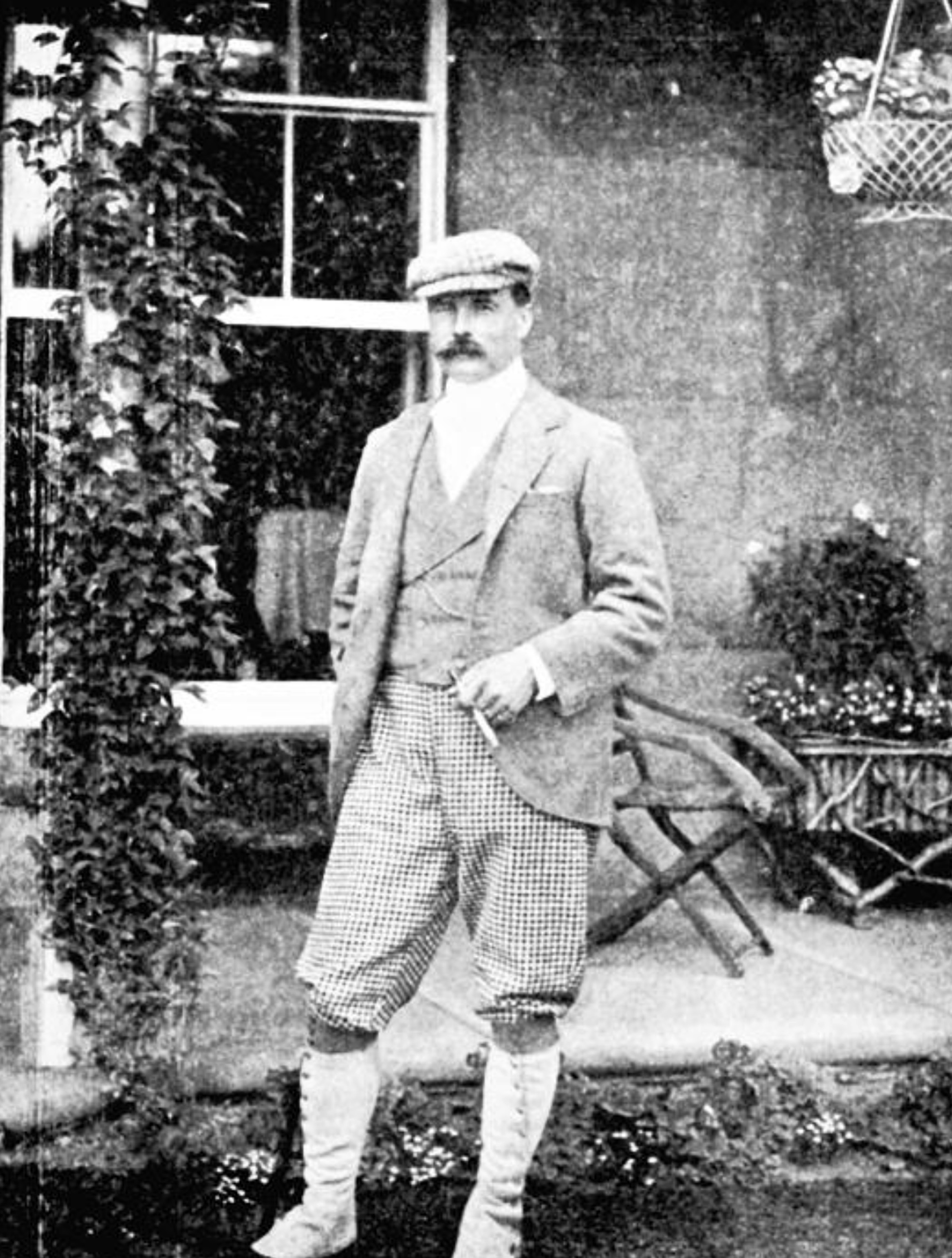
Sydney Fisher at Amington Hall in about 1900

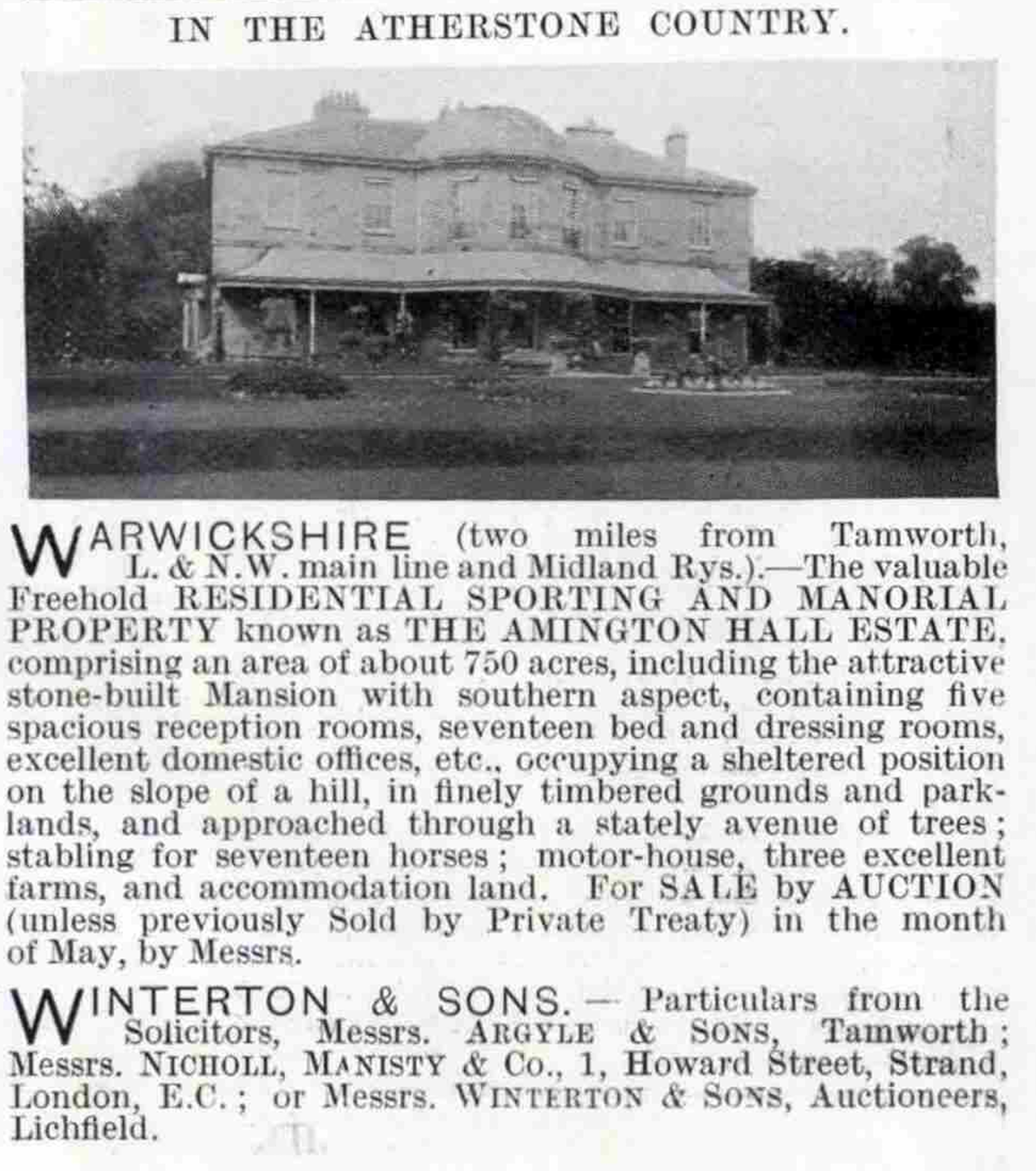
Sale notice for Amington Hall 1900

Charles Henry Wyndham A’Court Repington (1890–1903) did not live in the house but instead rented it to wealthy tenants. When he died in 1903 his son Charles à Court Repington inherited the Hall and continued this practice until he sold it in 1910. Their most notable tenant was Sydney Fisher who rented it from about 1890 and then subsequently bought the property when it was advertised for sale in 1910.

Sydney Fisher (1856–1927) was a wealthy paper manufacturer who owned the Kettlebrook Paper Mill. In 1886 he married Annie Louise Van Notten Pole who was the granddaughter of Sir Peter Van Notten Pole 3rd Baronet. The couple had four children. The 1911 Census records the family living at Amington Hall with a very large number of domestic servants including a butler, footman, hall boy, governess, two ladies maids and five house maids Sydney died in 1927 and in 1934 the property was sold.

== See also ==
- Grade II* listed buildings in Tamworth (borough)
- Listed buildings in Tamworth, Staffordshire
