= Grade II* listed buildings in Tamworth (borough) =

There are over 20,000 Grade II* listed buildings in England. This page is a list of these buildings in the district of Tamworth in Staffordshire.

== Tamworth ==
Name	Location	Type	Completed (Note: The date given is the date used by Historic England as significant for the initial building or that of an important part in the structure's description.)	Date designated	Grid ref. (Note: Sometimes known as OSGB36, the grid reference is based on the British national grid reference system used by the Ordnance Survey.) Geo-coordinates	Entry number (Note: The "List Entry Number" is a unique number assigned to each listed building and scheduled monument by Historic England.)	Image
Amington Hall	Tamworth	House	c. 1810	22 July 1953	SK2300805758; 52°38′57″N 1°39′41″W	1297342	Amington Hall More images
Dosthill Sunday School and Parish Room	Dosthill, Tamworth	Village Hall	1953	22 July 1953	SP2124599859; 52°35′46″N 1°41′16″W	1207811	Dosthill Sunday School and Parish Room More images
Spital Chapel of St James	Perrycrofts, Tamworth	Chapel	1909-1914	11 May 1950	SK2087905023; 52°38′33″N 1°41′34″W	1197039	Spital Chapel of St James More images
The Moat House	Tamworth	House	c. 1572	11 May 1950	SK2022303960; 52°37′59″N 1°42′09″W	1208600	The Moat House More images
Town Hall	Tamworth	Town Hall	1701	11 May 1950	SK2072803960; 52°37′59″N 1°41′43″W	1293012	Town Hall More images
