= Listed buildings in Tamworth, Staffordshire =

Tamworth is a market town and borough in Staffordshire, England. It contains 138 listed buildings that are recorded in the National Heritage List for England. Of these, three are listed at Grade I, the highest of the three grades, five are at Grade II*, the middle grade, and the others are at Grade II, the lowest grade. The town includes its central area and the districts of Amington, Bolehall, Dosthill, Fazeley, Glascote, and Wilnecote. The most important buildings in the town are the Church of St Editha, and Tamworth Castle and its causeway walls, all of which are listed at Grade I. Most of the listed buildings are houses and associated structures, shops and offices, many of which originated as houses. The Coventry Canal passes through the town and makes a junction with the termination of the Birmingham and Fazeley Canal. The listed buildings associated with the canals are bridges, an aqueduct, and a milepost. The other listed buildings include churches and items in churchyards, public houses, bridges over the River Tame, other structures associated with the castle, former schools, parts of medieval walls, a farmhouse, a barn, a hotel, a former workhouse, public buildings, banks, a milestone, a railway viaduct, a bowling clubhouse, statues, one of Sir Robert Peel and the other of Ethelfleda, and a war memorial.

== Key ==
Grade	Criteria
I	Buildings of exceptional interest, sometimes considered to be internationally important
II*	Particularly important buildings of more than special interest
II	Buildings of national importance and special interest

== Buildings ==
Name and location	Photograph	Date	Notes	Grade
Church of St Editha; 52.63420°N 1.69429°W		9th century	The church has been altered and extended through the centuries, particularly after a fire in 1345. It was restored in the 1850s by Benjamin Ferrey followed by George Gilbert Scott, and in 1871 by William Butterfield. The church is built in stone, and consists of a nave with a clerestory, north and south aisles, north and south transepts, north and south chapels, a chancel with a south vestry, and a west tower. The tower has three stages, gabled angle buttresses incorporating stair turrets, a west doorway, a west window with six lights and Perpendicular tracery, a niche with a statue of Saint George, a cornice with gargoyles, an embattled parapet with crocketed pinnacles, weathervanes, and a truncated spire.	I
Tamworth Castle; 52.63264°N 1.69687°W		Late 11th century	The castle has been altered and extended through the centuries, and has been converted into a museum. It is built in stone and brick, and has roofs of tile and lead. The castle has a shell keep with a northeast tower, a warden's lodge to the south, and later ranges forming an H-shaped house. The curtain walls have embattled parapets, and the tower has round turrets. The castle is also a scheduled monument.	I
Causeway walls, Tamworth Castle; 52.63276°N 1.69609°W		Late 11th century	The walls, which were extended in the 19th century, are in stone, they incorporate herringbone masonry, and have a 19th-century embattled parapet. The walls extend for about 28 metres (92 ft) to the east from the castle, and to the north for about a further 17 metres (56 ft).	I
Wall encircling Tamworth Castle; 52.63246°N 1.69684°W		Medieval (probable)	The wall has been rebuilt and repaired over the centuries. It is in stone with some brick, and with some stone coping. There are raking buttresses at intervals, and on the east side are piers with pineapple finials.	II
Dosthill Sunday School and Parish Room; 52.59614°N 1.68779°W		12th century	A chapel, later altered and used for other purposes, it is in stone with some brick, and has a tile roof. The building contains two Norman doorways and two Norman windows. The former chancel arch has been blocked, and it contains an inserted window with chamfered mullions.	II*
Spital Chapel of St. James; 52.64258°N 1.69292°W		Mid to late 12th century	Originally a chapel for a hospital, it has since been altered and used for other purposes. It is in stone with a tile roof, and consists of a small nave and chancel. The north doorway is late Norman, the south doorway is in Early English style, and the east window is Perpendicular.	II*
Wall north of 29 and 30 Church Street; 52.63431°N 1.69358°W	—	14th century	The wall was part of the medieval deanery, and is in stone with tile inclusions. The wall extends for about 20 metres (66 ft), and varies between 3 metres (9.8 ft) and 1 metre (3 ft 3 in) in height.	II
Wall west-southwest of 9 Lower Gungate; 52.63454°N 1.69372°W	—	14th century	The wall was part of the medieval deanery, it is in stone, and most of it is obscured by later buildings. At the west end is a blocked window opening and a buttress.	II
Cruck Barn; 52.59595°N 1.68703°W	—	15th to 16th century	A timber framed barn with cruck construction and brick infill, on a stone plinth, and with a tile roof. There are four bays, outshuts and a porch. The barn contains a threshing floor entrance and other openings, including a gabled dormer. Inside, there are cruck trusses.	II
1 George Street; 52.63334°N 1.69243°W	—	16th century (possible)	A house on a corner site that was altered and is a shop. It is stuccoed over a timber framed core, and has a parapet and a tile roof. There are two storeys, the upper storey jettied, and two bays. In the ground floor is a shop front with panelled pilasters, a bracketed fascia, and a recessed corner entrance. In the upper floor are casement windows.	II
139 Hockley Road; 52.60503°N 1.66675°W	—	16th century	The house, which has been altered, is timber framed with brick infill, and a tile roof. There are two storeys and two bays. The windows are 20th-century casements, and at the rear is a gabled porch.	II
The Moat House; 52.63303°N 1.70267°W		c. 1572	A house, later a restaurant, it is in brick with stone dressings and tile roofs, and is in Elizabethan style. There are two storeys and an attic, and an H-shaped plan, consisting of a range of six bays flanked by projecting gabled wings. On the front are three gables, and an entrance with a moulded surround, an armorial panel, and a gable with ball finial. All the gables are crow-stepped, in the outer bays are Venetian windows, and the other windows are sashes. At the east end is a three-stage tower with an embattled parapet.	II*
116 and 117 Lichfield Street; 52.63405°N 1.69862°W	—	Late 16th century (probable)	A house, later two shops, it is timber framed with a rendered front and a tile roof. There are two storeys, five bays, and a rear gabled wing. Both parts have doorways with segmental heads. The doorway of No. 116 is flanked by segmental-headed windows, and in the upper floor are casement windows flanking a blind window. No. 117 has a bow window with a frieze, a cornice and a canopy in the ground floor, and the upper floor contains a mullioned and transomed window and a blind window.	II
3 and 4 Lady Bank; 52.63271°N 1.69783°W	—	Late 16th or early 17th century	A pair of houses, later an office, it was remodelled in the 19th century. It has a timber framed core, with brick cladding, and a tile roof. There are two storeys, three bays, and two gabled rear wings. The two doorways and the ground floor windows have segmental heads. There is exposed timber framing on the right gable end, and in the interior.	II
110 and 111 Lichfield Street; 52.63401°N 1.69899°W	—	Late 16th or early 17th century	A house, later divided into two shops. It is timber framed with brick infill, and was originally a two-bay two-storey hall range with a gabled cross-wing to the right, and a small extension further to the right. The hall range has been rendered, and the roofs are tiled. The upper storey of the cross-wing is jettied, and the ground floor contains a 20th-century shop front and an entry to the right. In the hall range is an entry to the left and a doorway, both with segmental heads. Flanking the doorway are shop windows, and the other windows are casements.	II
Amington Old Hall; 52.64632°N 1.65901°W	—	16th to 17th century	Most of the house dates from the 18th century. It is in brick with a roof of tile and lead with coped gables. There are two storeys and a front of four bays, the second bay being a gabled cross-wing, and the fourth bay is gabled and projecting. The doorway has fluted pilasters and a triglyph frieze. The windows vary, and include sashes, small-pane casements, and windows with transoms.	II
Yew Tree House; 52.63772°N 1.65312°W	—	Late 16th or early 17th century	The house, which was extended in the 18th century, is timber framed, mostly plastered, with extensions in brick, and a tile roof. There is one storey and an attic, a front of four bays, and a single-storey rear wing. The three right bays are gabled, the windows are casements, and the left bay contains a gabled dormer. Inside the house is a priest hole.	II
5–9 Bolebridge Street; 52.63318°N 1.69187°W	—	17th century	Two shops with flats, they have a timber framed core, walls in brick, and a tile roof. There are two storeys, four bays, and a large rear extension. In the ground floor are two 20th-century shop fronts, and a central entry to the upper floor. The upper floor contains casement windows, and inside there is some exposed timber framing.	II
66 and 67 Church Street; 52.63388°N 1.69672°W	—	17th century	Most of the building dates from the 18th century; a house, later two shops, it is in painted brick, and has a dentilled frieze between the floors, another at the top, a coved cornice, and a tile roof. There are two storeys and an attic, five bays, and a single-storey gabled rear wing. In the upper floor, the middle bay projects forward, it is flanked by pilaster strips, and contains a blind window. The other bays contain sash windows with segmental heads, and there are two gabled dormers. In the ground floor are 20th-century shop fronts on a marble plinth with a black glass fascia.	II
68 Church Street; 52.63387°N 1.69687°W	—	17th century	A house that was altered in the 18th century and later used for other purposes, it is in painted brick with some timber framing and a tile roof. There are two storeys and an attic, two bays, and a rear gabled wing. The two bays differ, the right being lower, and containing a band, a modillioned cornice, a shop front in the ground floor, and a segmental-headed window above. The left part has a top frieze and coved cornice, a blocked doorway, a doorway converted into a window, and windows with segmental heads. Both parts have a gabled dormer.	II
10 Colehill; 52.63383°N 1.69263°W	—	17th century (probable)	A house, later offices, it was refronted in the 19th century. The building is in pebbledashed brick with stone dressings and a parapeted roof. There are three storeys, a double-depth plan, a symmetrical front of five bays, and a rear wing. In the centre is a Tuscan porch with columns on plinths, and the windows are sashes. Inside, there is exposed timber framing.	II
9 and 11 Lower Gungate; 52.63466°N 1.69342°W	—	17th century	A pair of timber framed shops with brick infill, some stone, and a tile roof. Each shop has two storeys, one bay, and gabled rear extensions. In the ground floor are small-paned windows with segmental heads and doorways, and the upper floor contains small-paned casement windows. Inside the shops are timber-framed partitions.	II
Hockley Hall; 52.59667°N 1.66859°W	—	17th century	The house is in rendered brick with floor bands, and a tile roof with gables on kneelers. There are two storeys and an attic, and a T-shaped plan, consisting of a main symmetrical range of three bays, a full-height gabled wing, and a single-storey rear wing with outshuts. The windows are small-pane casements with wedge lintels.	II
Manor Farmhouse; 52.60774°N 1.66780°W	—	17th century	The farmhouse, later a private house, has been altered and extended. It has a timber framed core, it is clad in brick, partly rendered, and has a tile roof with coped gables. There is one storey and an attic, and a symmetrical front of three bays. On the front is a two-storey gabled porch with a pointed opening and a door with a fanlight. The windows are cross-casements with segmental heads. Inside, there is much exposed timber framing.	II
Market Vaults public house 52.63322°N 1.69627°W	—	17th century	The public house was refronted in the 18th century. It is in painted brick, with a timber framed rear wing and a tile roof. There are two storeys and an attic and two bays. In the ground floor is a 19th-century pub front with panelled pilasters, an entablature, an etched plate glass window, and a doorway with a fanlight, and there is another entry to the right. In the upper floor are top-hung casement windows, and in the attic are two hipped dormers.	II
Queen's Head Inn; 52.60831°N 1.66504°W		17th century	The public house, which has been extended and altered, is in brick with a stuccoed front and a tile roof. The original part has one storey and an attic, and three bays. There are extensions on both sides; the left extension has two bays, the right has a single storey addition, and at the rear are gabled wings. The central doorway has columns and an entablature, the windows are small-paned casements, and there are three gabled dormers. Inside, there is a possible cruck base.	II
36 and 36A George Street; 52.63336°N 1.69292°W	—	Late 17th century	Two shops and flats that have been altered. They are in brick with a plastered front, a top cornice, and a tile roof. There are two storeys and an attic, an L-shaped plan, three bays, and a small gabled rear wing with an outshut. In the ground floor are two 20th-century shop fronts and a carriageway to the right. The upper floor contains three canted oriel windows with coved bases, pilasters, dentilled cornices, and sash windows, and in the attic are three hipped dormers.	II
32, 33 and 33A Market Street; 52.63310°N 1.69643°W	—	c. 1700	A house that was altered in the 19th century and is a shop and office. It is in chequered brick with stone dressings and a tile roof. There are two storeys and an attic, a double-depth plan, four bays, and a gabled rear wing. In the ground floor is an arcade on round columns, the arches with keystones, and above it is a cornice on facetted brackets. In the upper floor are cross-casement windows, and above is a gabled dormer. At the rear are casement windows with segmental heads.	II
Bole Hall; 52.63177°N 1.68528°W	—	c. 1700	A house, later offices, it is in brick with stuccoed dressings, a string course, a top cornice, a coped parapet, end pilasters with entablature blocks, and a tile roof, and is in early Georgian style. There are two storeys and an attic, a double-depth plan, and a symmetrical front of three bays, the middle bay projecting. The doorway has a rusticated surround, voussoirs cutting the entablature, and a segmental pediment. The windows are top-hung casements, with keystones, and there are three flat-roofed dormers.	II
15 Lower Gungate; 52.63472°N 1.69345°W	—	17th or early 18th century	A shop, later altered and converted into a public house, it is in painted brick and has a tile roof. There is one storey and an attic, two bays, and a rear two-storey two-bay wing. The central entrance is flanked by 20th-century small-paned bow windows, and above are two gabled dormers.	II
21 Lower Gungate; 52.63516°N 1.69374°W		17th or early 18th century	A small shop in stuccoed brick with a tile roof, two storeys, one bay, and a small gabled rear wing. In the ground floor is a shop window with pilasters and a bracketed cornice, and a canopy over the window and entrance, and in the upper floor is a casement window.	II
28 and 29 Market Street; 52.63302°N 1.69597°W	—	17th or early 18th century	A pair of shops that were refronted in about 1840. They are in brick with a timber framed rear wing and a tile roof. There are three storeys, three bays, and a rear gabled wing with an outshut. On the front is a central entrance with a fanlight, flanked by 20th-century shop fronts. In the upper floors are three-light leaded casement windows with plaster surrounds and rosettes in the angles.	II
Town Hall; 52.63307°N 1.69543°W		1701	The town hall was paid for by Thomas Guy, it was extended in 1811, and rebuilt in 1845. It is in chequer brick with stone dressings and a hipped tile roof. There are two storeys with an arcaded ground floor and a two-storey rear extension. In the ground floor are Doric columns with archivolts and keystones. The upper floor has quoins, a modillioned cornice and a pediment, and it contains round-arched windows and an inscribed plaque. On the roof is a hexagonal louvre with a modillioned cornice, an ogival cupola and a weathervane.	II*
New Meeting House; 52.63395°N 1.69189°W		1724	Originally a Presbyterian chapel, it was altered in 1879–80. The building is in chequer brick, the front is pebbledashed, and it has bands, a top cornice, and a hipped slate roof. The building is in early Georgian style and has a rectangular plan, with one storey and five bays. On the front to the left is a gabled porch, and there are two tiers of windows, which are small-pane casements. At the rear, the windows are cross-casements with segmental heads.	II
21 Church Street and wall 52.63397°N 1.69526°W	—	Early 18th century	A house, later a police station, an office, and a hotel, it is in brick with stone dressings, a cornice over the ground floor, a top modillioned cornice, and a tile roof with coped gables. It is in early Georgian style, and has two storeys, seven bays, and a rear gabled wing with an attic. There are two doorways with architraves, friezes and cornices. The windows are sashes with keystones, and in the upper floor they have rounded heads. At the rear is a garden wall.	II
19 Lichfield Street; 52.63385°N 1.69960°W	—	Early 18th century	A house in chequer brick with vitrified headers on a stone plinth, with a band, a top frieze and modillioned cornice, and a tile roof. There are two storeys and an attic, three wide bays, and two rear gabled wings. The central doorway has an architrave, a frieze, and a modillioned cornice. This is flanked by segmental-headed windows, on the left is a transomed casement, and on the right is a tripartite sash window. The upper floor contains five cross-casements, and in the attic are three gabled dormers.	II
6 Market Street; 52.63321°N 1.69638°W	—	Early 18th century	A house, later a shop, it was altered later. The shop is in stuccoed brick, with a top modillioned cornice and a fascia, and a tile roof. It is in Georgian style, and has two storeys and an attic, and four bays. In the ground floor is a shop front dating from the 1870s that has panelled and fluted Corinthian pilasters, a fascia with end blocks and decorative cast iron cresting, plate glass windows that have slender colonnettes with decorative brackets, and a recessed doorway with a fanlight. To the right is another doorway with a fanlight. The upper floor contains sash windows, and in the attic are two raking dormers.	II
30 Market Street; 52.63305°N 1.69615°W	—	Early 18th century	A house, later a shop and studio, it is in brick with a modillioned cornice, and a tile roof, and is in Georgian style. There are two storeys and an attic, four bays, and a rear gabled wing. In the ground floor is a shop front dating from about 1900 with Art Nouveau features on the pilasters, a fascia with end brackets and scrolled cast iron cresting, and a recessed entrance. To the left is a round-headed entry with a keystone. The upper floor contains sash windows with segmental arches, and there are two gabled dormers.	II
34 Market Street; 52.63312°N 1.69656°W	—	Early 18th century	A house, later two shops and flats, it was refronted in about 1850. The building is in brick with stone dressings, sill bands, bracketed eaves, and a two-span roof, the front span slated, and the rear span tiled. There are three storeys, a double-depth plan, and three bays. In the ground floor is a shop front with pilasters and an entablature, and a central doorway with a fanlight, and to the right is a doorway with a round head, an archivolt, and a keystone with a rosette. The upper floors contain sash windows in architraves with keystones, those in the middle floor also with scrolls, and to the right are 19th-century iron lamps. The rear range is in chequered brick and has casement windows with segmental heads and two dormer windows.	II
Castle Hotel and The Bow Street Runner; 52.63316°N 1.69727°W		Early 18th century	The hotel, which incorporates a public house, has been extended. It is in brick with stone dressings and tile roofs, and has an L-shaped plan. The original block, on a corner site, has three storeys, four bays on Holloway, and five on Market Street. The windows in the lower two floors are sashes, and in the top floor they are casements. On the Market Street front is a pub entrance with Ionic pilasters, a frieze and a cornice, and on the Holloway front is a Tuscan porch with a scrolled wrought iron balcony. The first extension along Holloway has four storeys and three bays, then three storeys and one bay; these contain windows with segmental heads. Beyond that is an extension with two storeys, four bays, and three shaped gables, containing two elliptical-headed carriage entries, a large oriel window on brackets with a bowed centre, and a doorway and windows with round heads, hoods and keystones. There is a further extension on Market Street of three storeys and two bays.	II
Old Stone Cross public house 52.63414°N 1.69330°W		Early 18th century	The public house has cellars dating from the 16th century, and the front was reconstructed in 1974. It is in brick with some timber framing, concrete dressings, quoins, and a tile roof, hipped to one end. There are two storeys, five bays, and a rear gabled plastered wing. On the front are two doorways with bracketed round-arched hoods, and the windows are 20th-century casements with wedge lintels and keystones.	II
1 Colehill; 52.63358°N 1.69277°W	—	Early to mid 18th century	A brick shop with a top cornice and a tile roof. There are two storeys and an attic, three bays, and a gabled rear wing. In the ground floor is a late 19th-century shop front with a canopy, the upper floor contains small-pane casement windows, and there are two gabled dormers.	II
1 King Street; 52.63383°N 1.69656°W	—	Early to mid 18th century	A house, later a shop and office, it was altered in the 20th century. The building is in brick with a top wooden cornice and a tile roof, and is in Georgian style. There are two storeys and an attic, and an L-shaped plan, with a front of three bays on Church Street. In the left two bays of the ground floor is an early 20th-century shop front that has a doorway with a fanlight on the canted corner. To the right is the entrance to King Street. The upper floor contains three sash windows with segmental heads, and there are two gabled dormers.	II
2 and 3 Market Street; 52.63328°N 1.69679°W	—	Early to mid 18th century	Two houses, later converted into a shop, it is in brick with a top cornice and a tile roof. The shop in Georgian style, and has two storeys and an attic, a front of five bays, and two gabled wings at the rear. In the right bay is an entrance with a lintel and a segmental relieving arch, and the other bays contain a 20th-century shop front. In the upper floor are sash windows, and the attic contains two gabled dormers. At the rear, most of the windows have segmental heads, and there is a stair window with transoms.	II
Gazebo south of the Moat House; 52.63279°N 1.70267°W	—	Early to mid 18th century	The gazebo is in brick with some stone, a top coved cornice, and a pyramidal tile roof, and is in Georgian style. It has a square plan and two storeys. Steps lead up to an upper floor doorway on the north side, and on the west side is a doorway with a pointed arch and a keystone. The window on the south side is a top-hung casement, and the other windows are sashes with segmental heads. On the top is a weathervane.	II
Brewery House, 1 Lady Bank; 52.63262°N 1.69844°W	—	1750	Originally a workhouse, later a brewery, the building is in brick with stone dressings on a stone plinth, and has a cornice and a hipped tile roof. It is in Georgian style, and has a U-shaped plan. The front facing the street has two storeys, and a symmetrical front of five bays, the middle bay projecting forward under a pediment. The central doorway has an architrave with a keystone, and a fanlight, and the windows are sashes with keystones. The left return has nine bays, the outer two bays at each end projecting, and there are later alterations and extensions at the rear.	II
Wall, railings and gate, Brewery House; 52.63255°N 1.69789°W	—	c. 1750	A low brick wall on a stone plinth with stone coping and cast iron railings with decorative heads extends along the east side of the garden. At the left end and flanking the gateway on the right are brick piers with stone caps. A higher wall extends for about 14 metres (46 ft) along Holloway.	II
10 Church Street; 52.63399°N 1.69656°W	—	Mid 18th century (probable)	A house, later a shop, it is in painted brick with a top cornice and a half-hipped tile roof. There are two storeys and an attic, two bays, and a gabled rear wing. In the ground floor is a 20th-century shop front flanked by two doorways, the left one blocked. The upper floor contains sash windows, and there are two hipped dormers.	II
28 Lichfield Street; 52.63394°N 1.70099°W	—	18th century	A house that was extended and refronted in the 19th century and used for other purposes. It is in brick with a stuccoed front, pilasters at the ends and between the bays, a top entablature, and a tile roof. There are two storeys, five bays, and at the rear are three gables and a small gabled wing. The main doorway has pilasters, a fanlight, and an entablature, and there is a smaller doorway to the right with a fanlight. The windows on the front are sashes. At the rear are segmental-headed windows, a stair window, and more sash windows.	II
1 Market Street; 52.63331°N 1.69708°W	—	Mid 18th century	The building, at one time a hotel, was extended in the 19th century. It is in brick with stone dressings. The original part has two storeys and an attic, and five bays. The doorway is in a blocked elliptical carriageway, and has a doorway with a pediment.. The windows are sashes and there are four dormers. The extension to the left has two storeys and four bays. The entrance is in a canted corner with a window in a distyle Ionic colonnade. In Silver Street is a window in a former doorway with an Ionic doorcase. The windows are a mix of sashes and casements.	II
26A, 27 and 27A Market Street; 52.63300°N 1.69578°W	—	18th century	Three shops that were refronted in the 19th century, they are in brick with stone dressings and have a tile roof. There are two storeys and four bays. In the ground floor are late 19th-century shop fronts with fascias and recessed entrances; No. 26A also has panelled pilasters. In the upper floor are sash windows with rusticated wedge lintels, and in the roof are skylights and a hipped dormer.	II
Church Farmhouse and Hawthorn Cottage; 52.59581°N 1.68741°W	—	18th century	A farmhouse later divided into two dwellings that are in brick with tile roofs. The house has three storeys, two bays, a rear gabled wing, and a two-storey porch wing. The windows are 20th-century casements with segmental heads. The cottage has a single storey and an attic, a rear gabled porch and gabled dormers.	II
Urn southeast of Holloway Lodge; 52.63226°N 1.69744°W	—	18th century	The urn in the grounds of Tamworth Castle is in stone. It stands on a plinth with fielded panels, it has scrolled handles and festoons, and is surmounted by a finial.	II
Urn southeast of Tamworth Castle; 52.63226°N 1.69636°W	—	18th century	The urn in the grounds of the castle is in stone. It stands on a plinth with fielded panels and an acanthus base, and is decorated with masks and festoons. The top is moulded and surmounted by a finial.	II
Urn southwest of Upper Lodge; 52.63259°N 1.69589°W	—	18th century	The urn in the grounds of Tamworth Castle is in stone. It stands on a rusticated plinth with a moulded base. The urn is decorated with heads, flowers, and shells, and is surmounted by a finial.	II
3, 4 and 4A Bolebridge Street; 52.63327°N 1.69201°W	—	c. 1760	Two houses, later shops and an office, the building is in brick on a blue brick plinth, with bands, and a tile roof with a coped gable on the left. It is in Georgian style, and has three storeys and three bays, and at the rear are two gabled wings and a later extension. At the left is a 20th-century shop front and an entry to mews on the right, with a frieze and cornice over both. Further to the right is an entry to a recessed doorway, and the windows are sashes.	II
11 Colehill; 52.63374°N 1.69256°W	—	Mid to late 18th century	A house, later a shop, in brick with a band, a top cornice, and a tile roof with coped gables. There are three storeys, an L-shaped plan, three bays, and a two-storey rear wing. In the ground floor is a 20th-century shop front and a doorway to the right, and the upper floors contain sash windows.	II
Lane House, Coton; 52.63947°N 1.71878°W	—	Mid to late 18th century	A brick house with stone dressings, a sill band, a top cornice, and a slate roof. There are three storeys, an L-shaped plan with later additions, and a front of three bays. The round-headed doorway has fluted pilasters, a fanlight, and an open pediment. To its left is a bow window with pilaster strips and a bracketed cornice, and the other windows are sashes.	II
11 Aldergate; 52.63539°N 1.69642°W	—	c. 1770	A house, later offices, it was extended in the 19th century. The building is in brick with stone dressings, on a plastered plinth, with sill bands, a top cornice and a two-span slate roof. There is tile hanging on the left return. The building is in Georgian style, and has three storeys, a double-depth plan, a symmetrical front of three bays, and a two-storey rear wing. The central round-headed doorway has panelled pilasters, entablature blocks, a fanlight, and an open pediment. Flanking the doorway are bay windows, each with angle pilasters, a frieze and a cornice, and in the upper floors are sash windows.	II
15 Aldergate; 52.63565°N 1.69570°W	—	c. 1770	A house, later divided into flats, it is in brick with a modillioned cornice and a tile roof. The building is in Georgian style, and has three storeys, and a symmetrical front of three bays. The central doorway has pilasters, a fanlight, a frieze, and a pediment. The windows are top-hung casements, those in the lower two floors with rusticated wedge lintels. At the rear is a gabled wing containing two elliptical-headed carriage arches and a canted oriel window.	II
16 and 17 Aldergate; 52.63572°N 1.69562°W	—	c. 1770	A pair of houses, later an office, the building is in brick with a tile roof, and is in Georgian style. There are three storeys, a symmetrical front of three bays, and two rear gabled wings. The ground floor has channelled plaster rustication, there is a sill band, and a top cornice. The central entrance is in a former elliptical-headed carriageway. The ground floor windows are tripartite sashes, and in the upper floors are top-hung casement windows with rusticated wedge lintels.	II
Amington House; 52.63747°N 1.65400°W	—	c. 1770	The house was extended in the 19th century with the addition of a rear wing. It is in brick with a cornice and a tile roof. The house has three storeys, a symmetrical front of three bays, and two rear wings. The central doorway has reeded pilasters, a fanlight, triglyph entablature blocks, and an open pediment, and the windows are sashes.	II
Tamworth Arts Centre; 52.63430°N 1.69323°W		c. 1770	Originally a theatre, in the 19th century it was a malthouse, in 1870 a Baptist chapel, the porch was added in 1908, and in 1970 it became an arts centre. The building is in stuccoed brick, on a plinth, with pebbledash and terracotta dressings, pilasters, and a tile roof with a dentilled pedimented gable. There are two storeys and a right-angle plan. At the entrance is a porch with a terracotta frieze and parapet, paired Ionic half-columns, a pulvinated frieze, a cornice, and a round-arched hood. Above the porch are three round-headed windows with angle pilasters, archivolts and keystones. Along the side of the buildings the windows in the upper floor have round heads, and in the ground floor are smaller square-headed windows.	II
The Manor House, Hockley Road; 52.60671°N 1.66761°W	—	c. 1770	The house is in stone with a tile roof, three storeys, a symmetrical front range of three bays, a parallel rear range, and a lower rear wing. The central doorway has panelled pilasters and a cornice on decorative consoles, and is flanked by bay windows with friezes. The windows are a mix of sashes and casements with segmental heads.	II
Dosthill House; 52.60569°N 1.68808°W	—	Late 18th century	The house is in stuccoed brick with stone dressings and a hipped slate roof. There are three storeys and a double-depth plan. The entrance front has four bays, the right two bays projecting. In the angle is a tetrastyle porch that has Doric columns with fluted capitals and an Ionic entablature with a fluted frieze, swags, and paterae. The windows are sashes. In the left return are two full-height canted bay windows, and in the right return are two wings and a stair window. At the rear is a two-storey wing containing a gabled pitching hole. To the right are pavilions with pilasters and pedimented gables, and between them is a stone-coped wall with a central entrance.	II
Tame House, Coton; 52.639658°N 1.719141°W	—	Late 18th century	A brick house with stone dressings, later used for other purposes, it has sill bands, a top cornice, a stone-coped brick parapet, and a slate roof. There are two storeys, a double-depth plan, a symmetrical front of three bays, and at the rear is a gabled wing and an extension. The central round-headed doorway has pilasters, a fanlight, and an open pediment. The windows are sashes with keystones.	II
The Alders, Coton; 52.63963°N 1.71933°W	—	Late 18th century	A house, later extended and used for other purposes, it is in brick with stone dressings, sill bands, a top cornice, a stone-coped brick parapet, and a slate roof. There are two storeys, a double-depth plan, a symmetrical front of three bays, a later two-storey wing to the left, and a rear gabled wing. The central round-headed doorway has pilasters, a fanlight, and an open pediment. It is flanked by canted bay windows with plastered parapets. The other windows are sashes with keystones.	II
The Old House, Coton; 52.64025°N 1.72148°W	—	Late 18th century	A brick house with stone dressings, a sill band, a top cornice, a stone-coped brick parapet, and a slate roof. There are two storeys, an L-shaped plan, and a symmetrical front of three bays. The central doorway has pilasters and an open pediment. The windows are sashes; in the ground floor they are tripartite, and in the upper floor they have keystones.	II
2 Bolebridge Street; 52.63335°N 1.69210°W	—	c. 1780	A house, later an office, it is in brick on a blue brick plinth, with a top cornice, a parapet, and a tile roof with coped gables. It is in Georgian style, and has three storeys, a double-depth plan, four bays, and a gabled rear wing. The doorway has panelled pilasters, a fanlight, entablature blocks, and an open pediment. In the right bay is an elliptical-headed carriage entrance, and the windows are sashes.	II
Bridge No. 65, Coventry Canal; 52.63811°N 1.65509°W		1785–90	The bridge carries Old Tamworth Road over the canal, it is in brick, and consists of a single segmental skew arch. The bridge has parapets with stone-coped piers and chamfered coping.	II
Bridge No 66 (Askew Bridge), Coventry Canal; 52.63757°N 1.65673°W		1785–90	The bridge carries Old Tamworth Road over the canal, it is in brick, and consists of a single elliptical skew arch. The bridge has parapets with stone-coped end piers and chamfered coping.	II
Bridge No. 67, Coventry Canal; 52.63635°N 1.66053°W		1785–90	The bridge carries a footpath over the canal, it is in brick, and consists of a single segmental arch. The bridge has parapets with stone-coped piers and rounded coping.	II
Bridge No. 68, Coventry Canal; 52.63583°N 1.66266°W		1785–90	The bridge carries a footpath over the canal, it is in brick, and consists of a single segmental arch. The bridge has parapets with stone-coped piers and rounded coping.	II
Bridge No. 69, Coventry Canal; 52.63500°N 1.66709°W		1785–90	The bridge carries a footpath over the canal, it is in brick, and consists of a single segmental arch. The bridge has parapets with stone-coped piers and rounded coping.	II
Bridge No. 70, Coventry Canal; 52.63442°N 1.67047°W		1785–90	The bridge carries a footpath over the canal, it is in brick, and consists of a single segmental arch. The bridge has parapets with stone-coped piers and rounded coping.	II
Bridge No. 75, Coventry Canal; 52.62114°N 1.68989°W		1785–90	An accommodation bridge over the canal, it is in brick with stone coping, and consists of a single segmental arch. The bridge has parapets with stone-coped piers, and the abutment to the west is pierced by a small round-vaulted tunnel.	II
Milepost near Bridge No. 65; 52.63880°N 1.65386°W		1785–90	The milepost is on the towpath of the Coventry Canal. It is in stone, and is square with a rounded top, and is set diagonally. The stone is inscribed with the numbers "8" and "24".	II
Tame Aqueduct and pill box 52.61741°N 1.69145°W		1785–90	The aqueduct carries the Coventry Canal over the River Tame. It is in brick with stone dressings, and is plastered on the north side. The aqueduct consists of three segmental arches with angular cutwaters. It has a parapet with brick coping, stone-coped piers on the south side, and iron railings to the north. At the west end of the south side is a rectangular pillbox dating from 1940.	II
Hopwas Bridge; 52.64364°N 1.73409°W		1796	The bridge carries the A51 road over the River Tame. It is in stone, and consists of five elliptical arches. The piers have pointed cutwaters and paired Tuscan pilasters. The bridge has a frieze, a moulded band, and a coped parapet.	II
Lady Bridge; 52.63170°N 1.69811°W		1796	The bridge, which carries Holloway over the River Tame was widened in 1840. It is in stone, and consists of six rusticated segmental arches, the middle two arches being larger. The bridge has a continuous hood band, a plain parapet to the east, a moulded parapet to the west, and octagonal piers at the south end.	II
12 and 13 Aldergate; 52.63550°N 1.69629°W	—	c. 1800	A pair of houses, later offices, they are in brick with a slate roof. There are three storeys, a double-depth plan, and a symmetrical front of two bays. In the top floor is a casement window, the other windows are sashes, and the entrances are on the sides.	II
14 Aldergate and outbuilding 52.63552°N 1.69609°W	—	c. 1800	A house, later a shop and offices, it is in brick with a modillioned cornice and a slate roof. There are three storeys, a double-depth plan, and a symmetrical front of three bays. At the rear are two gabled wings, and a workshop with an L-shaped plan. On the front is a 20th-century shop front, and the upper floors contain sash windows.	II
5 Lady Bank; 52.63282°N 1.69779°W	—	c. 1800	A house, later divided into flats, it is in brick with stone dressings, a sill band, a top cornice, and a tile roof. It is in Georgian style, and has two storeys and an attic, a symmetrical front of three bays, and three rear wings. The central doorway has an architrave, a fanlight, a frieze, and a cornice on consoles. The windows are sashes, and there are three hipped dormers.	II
3, 4 and 5 George Street; 52.63319°N 1.69282°W	—	Late 18th or early 19th century	A row of three shops with accommodation above, they are in brick with stuccoed dressings and a tile roof. There are three storeys, eight bays, and rear extensions. No. 3 has a 20th-century shop front with panelled pilasters, a fascia, a cornice, and a central entrance. No. 4 has a late 19th-century shop front that has end piers with turned balusters, a fascia with decorative iron cresting above, windows with slender colonnettes, and a recessed doorway. No. 5 has a 20th-century shop front. In the upper floors are sash windows with wedge lintels, and on No. 4 is a round clock face.	II
Glascote Cottage; 52.62694°N 1.66871°W	—	Late 18th or early 19th century	The house is stuccoed with some exposed stone, sill bands, and a tile roof. There are two storeys, a symmetrical range of three bays, a slightly lower range of two bays to the right, and a large single-storey extension with a hipped roof at the rear. The doorway has fluted pilasters, a fanlight, a frieze, and a cornice, and the windows are sashes.	II
Milestone, Upper Gungate; 52.63699°N 1.69478°W		Late 18th or early 19th century	The milestone, which has been relocated, consists of a flat stone with a rounded top and a cast iron plate. On the plate are the distances to Sutton Coldfield, Birmingham, Ashby de la Zouch, Breedon on the Hill, Castle Donington, Sawley, and Nottingham.	II
10 Bolebridge Street; 52.63312°N 1.69175°W	—	c. 1810	A house, later extended and used for other purposes. It is in brick, the front is stuccoed, the ground floor is rusticated, above are giant Tuscan pilasters, a dentilled cornice, a blocking course, and a slate roof. There are three storeys, a double-depth plan, two bays, a single-storey extension to the right, and a later extension at the rear. The central round-headed doorway has a rusticated surround, a fanlight and a cornice, and the windows are sashes.	II
8 Lady Bank; 52.63307°N 1.69767°W	—	c. 1810	A house, later part of an office, it is in brick, and has a stuccoed ground floor with quoin strips and a cornice. There is a top cornice and a slate roof. The building is in Georgian style, and has two storeys, a double-depth plan, three bays, and two rear gabled wings. In the centre is a round-headed doorway with panelled pilasters, a fanlight, and an open pediment, and there is another doorway to the right with a fanlight. The windows are sashes, and at the rear is a round-headed stair window.	II
Amington Hall; 52.64907°N 1.66146°W		c. 1810	A country house later converted into flats, it is in stone with band, a cornice and blocking course, and a hipped slate roof. There are two storeys, a T-shaped plan, and a front range of three bays. The entrance front has a bowed Tuscan porch, and the windows are sashes. The right return has seven bays, and the middle three bays form a full-height bow window with a dome. At the rear is a two-storey painted brick wing with casement windows.	II*
Holloway Lodge; 52.63241°N 1.69769°W		1810	The lodge to Tamworth Castle is in the form of a gatehouse, it is in brick, and has a hipped slate roof. It has bands and an embattled parapet, and at the angles are round turrets. In the centre is a carriage entrance with a four-centred arch and a hood mould, above which is a coat of arms. At the rear are windows with chamfered mullions.	II
Perrycrofts; 52.64957°N 1.69094°W	—	c. 1810	A house, later divided into flats, it is in brick with stone dressings on a stone plinth with a hipped tile roof. There are three storeys, a double-depth plan, three bays, and a two-storey rear wing. On the front is a Doric porch with a round-headed entrance, a triglyph frieze, a modillioned cornice, an archivolt and a fanlight. The windows are sashes and at the rear is a round-headed stair window.	II
The White House, 93 Lichfield Street; 52.63415°N 1.70142°W	—	c. 1810	A house, later an office, it is stuccoed, and has a tile roof. It is in Georgian style, and has two storeys and an attic, six bays, and a wing and an extension at the rear. Above the third, fourth and fifth bays is a gable, and the other bays have a modillioned cornice. The first bay contains a two-storey bow window with rustication below the windows, pilaster strips on panelled plinths between them, and it contains sash windows. In the second bay is a doorway with pilasters, a fanlight, entablature blocks, and an open pediment. The other windows in the ground floor are sashes, and in the upper floor and attic they are casements.	II
8 and 9 Colehill; 52.63401°N 1.69274°W	—	c. 1820	A pair of houses, later shops, they are in brick with stone dressings, a central pilaster, a sill band, a top cornice, and a slate roof. The shops are in Georgian style, and have three storeys, a double-depth plan, and three bays each. No. 8, to the left, has a 19th-century shop front on a polished granite plinth, with slender colonnettes, two recessed entrances with bowed approaches, and a large fascia. No. 9 has a 20th-century shop front with a central entrance that has a triangular head, a panelled surround, a fanlight, and a pedimented gable. In the upper floors are sash windows with rusticated wedge lintels and keystones.	II
Castle Coach house and wall 52.63277°N 1.69743°W	—	c. 1820	The coach house is in stone with a hipped tile roof. There is a rectangular plan, a single storey and a loft. The coach entrance, the central entrance and the window have four-centred arched heads, and there is a quatrefoil pitching hole. The wall is in stone with an embattled parapet, and extends for about 33.5 metres (110 ft) along Holloway to Holloway Lodge.	II
Cotford; 52.62733°N 1.66922°W	—	c. 1820	The house is in stuccoed brick with a top frieze, boxed eaves, and a tile roof. There are two storeys, and a symmetrical front range of three bays. In the centre is a doorway with panelled pilasters, and a fanlight with a bracketed lantern, flanked by full-height canted bay windows. Along the upper floor is an elaborate wrought iron balcony, and the windows are casements. At the rear are two lower wings, and a hipped projection with a gabled porch and a stair window above.	II
Upper Lodge, Tamworth Castle; 52.63278°N 1.69569°W	—	c. 1820	The lodge is in stone with a triangular plan, one storey, a bowed front of two bays, and an embattled parapet. In the centre is an entrance with a segmental pointed arch and a quatrefoil above. At the ends are piers with loopholes, and between are two-light windows with segmental pointed heads. To the right is a short wall.	II
Wigginton Lodge; 52.64420°N 1.70673°W	—	c. 1820	A house, later used for other purposes, it is stuccoed, and has a sill band and a hipped slate roof. There are two storeys, a double-depth plan, and four bays.In the centre is a hipped porch with a round-headed entrance with paired fluted columns, a fanlight, and a modillioned cornice, and the windows are sashes. In the garden front is a bowed French window and a bowed verandah with reeded columns and a swept roof with spiked ball finials.	II
70 Church Street; 52.63386°N 1.69696°W	—	1820–40	A shop in brick with stuccoed dressings, a sill band, and a slate roof. There are three storeys, two bays, and a long rear gabled wing. In the ground floor is a 19th-century shop front with pilasters, a frieze and a cornice, and to the right is a carriage entrance with a rusticated elliptical arch. The upper floors contain sash windows with rusticated wedge lintels.	II
Holy Trinity Church, Wilnecote; 52.60911°N 1.66758°W		1821	The vestry was added to the church later in the century. The church is built in brick and has roofs of tile and slate, and consists of a nave and a chancel in one unit, a south porch, a north vestry and organ chamber, and a slim west tower. The tower has three stages, string courses, and an embattled parapet. The windows on the sides of the church have pointed heads and contain Y-tracery.	II
21–22 Church Street; 52.63399°N 1.69551°W	—	Early 19th century	Two houses, later offices, possibly with an 18th-century core. They are in brick on a plinth, with cornices and a hipped slate roof, and the windows are sashes. The left part has two storeys and three bays, in the ground floor the two left windows are in round-headed recesses. The right part has three storeys and two bays. The doorway has reeded pilasters, a frieze, a cornice, and a fanlight.	II
71 Church Street; 52.63388°N 1.69710°W	—	Early 19th century	A shop in painted brick with a top cornice and a tile roof. There are three storeys, two bays, and a rear gabled wing. In the ground floor is an entrance at each end, a sash window, and a former bow window with panelled pilasters, a frieze, and a cornice. The upper floors contain a mix of sash and casement windows.	II
6 and 7 Lady Bank; 52.63293°N 1.69772°W	—	Early 19th century	A pair of houses, later part of an office, the building was extended later in the 19th century. It is in brick with stone dressings, a top cornice, a tile roof to the original part, and a slate roof to the extension. There are two storeys, four bays, an extension to the right of one bay, and a rear gabled wing and an outshut. The original part has two round-headed doorways, one with a fanlight, and sash windows. In the extension is a round-headed doorway to the left, and a doorway with a lintel to the right. The ground floor window also has a lintel.	II
20 and 21 Lichfield Street; 52.63389°N 1.69981°W	—	Early 19th century	A house, later a shop and office, it is in brick, the front is stuccoed, and the roof tiled. There are three storeys and three bays, and a two-storey single-bay extension to the left. The doorway has pilasters, a fanlight, and an entablature, and there is a similar, simpler doorway to the left. The windows in the main part are sashes with rusticated wedge lintels, and in the extension is a 20th-century window in the ground floor and a casement window above.	II
22 Lichfield Street; 52.63390°N 1.70002°W	—	Early 19th century	A house later used for other purposes, it is brick, with sill bands, a top cornice, and a tile roof. The house is in Georgian style, and has three storeys, a symmetrical front of three bays, and a three-span gable at the rear. In the centre is a doorway with pilasters, a fanlight, and an open pediment, and this is flanked by Venetian windows. In the middle floor are sash windows with rusticated wedge lintels, and the top floor contains casement windows.	II
71, 72 and 73 Lichfield Street; 52.63421°N 1.70389°W	—	Early 19th century	A terrace containing a public house, a shop, and a private house. They are in brick, the public house is stuccoed, and they have a tile roof. There are two storeys and seven bays, and at the rear is a wing and a stable range. There is a pub front and a shop front, and No. 73 has a doorway with pilasters, a frieze, and a cornice. The windows are sashes with rusticated wedge lintels.	II
92 Lichfield Street; 52.63417°N 1.70186°W		Early 19th century	A house, later an office, it is in brick with stone dressings, sill bands, a top cornice, and an M-shaped tile roof with coped gables. It is in Georgian style, and has three storeys, a double-depth plan, a symmetrical front of three bays, and a rear extension. Steps lead up to a central round-headed doorway that has pilasters, a fanlight, entablature blocks, and an open pediment. The windows in the lower two floors are sashes, and in the top floor they are casements.	II
103 and 104 Lichfield Street; 52.63404°N 1.69954°W	—	Early 19th century	A pair of houses, later an office and a restaurant, the building is in brick with a modillioned cornice, and a slate roof. It is in Georgian style, and has three storeys and four bays, and at the rear are gabled wings and an outshut. In the ground floor is a carriage arch with a rusticated surround and an elliptical arch, flanked by 20th-century shop fronts. The upper floors contain sash windows.	II
1 Silver Street; 52.63328°N 1.69757°W	—	Early 19th century	A house, later an office, it is in brick with stone dressings, a modillioned cornice, and a slate roof. It is in Georgian style, and has three storeys, a double-depth plan, and a symmetrical front of three bays. The central doorway has an architrave, a frieze, and a swan-neck pediment on consoles. In the ground floor are small-paned windows, and the upper floors contain sash windows.	II
3 and 5 Victoria Road; 52.63374°N 1.69204°W	—	Early 19th century	A pair of houses, later shops, they are stuccoed with a slate roof. There are three storeys, a double-depth plan, each shop has three bays, and there are two gabled rear wings. In the ground floor are 20th-century shop fronts, and the upper floors contain sash windows, those in the middle floor with cornices.	II
Canal towpath bridge 52.62711°N 1.68091°W		Early 19th century	The bridge is on the west side of the Coventry Canal, and carries the towpath over the entrance to Glascote Basin. It is in brick, and consists of a single elliptical arch. The parapets have rounded coping, stone-coped brick piers, and on the canal side they sweep down to ground level.	II
Walls, piers, gates and railings, Cotford; 52.62755°N 1.66923°W	—	Early 19th century	The low walls on the north and west sides of the garden are in brick with stone coping. The ends ramp up to octagonal piers that have two tiers of round-headed panelling, cornices, and urn finials. The railings and gates are in cast iron, and the gates have decorative finials.	II
Wall east of Holloway Lodge; 52.63216°N 1.69708°W	—	Early 19th century	The wall extends for about 87 metres (285 ft) from Holloway Lodge to the east along the south of the mound of Tamworth Castle. It is in stone, and on the east half is an embattled parapet.	II
Tamworth Masonic Rooms, 29 Lichfield Street; 52.63394°N 1.70122°W	—	Early 19th century	A house, later used for other purposes, it is in brick with stone dressings, sill bands, a top cornice, and a roof of slate at the front and tile at the rear. The building is in Georgian style, and has three storeys, a symmetrical front of three bays, and a rear wing with a hipped roof and an extension. The central round-headed doorway has pilasters, a fanlight, and an open pediment, and the windows are sashes.	II
The Manor House, 95 Lichfield Street; 52.63412°N 1.70088°W		Early 19th century	The remodelling of an earlier house, later an office, it is in brick with stone dressings, on a stone plinth, with a sill band, a top cornice, and a hipped tile roof. It is in Georgian style, with two storeys, a double-depth plan, and a symmetrical front of seven bays, the outer two bays at each end projecting forward. Steps lead up to the central doorway that has an architrave, a fanlight, a fluted frieze, and a cornice on consoles. The ground floor windows are sashes, and in the upper floor are top-hung casement windows.	II
The White House, wall and railings, Church Street; 52.63417°N 1.69575°W	—	Early 19th century	A house, later offices, it is stuccoed, and has a band, angle pilasters with entablature blocks, a top cornice, and a coped parapet. The building is in early Georgian style, and has three storeys, and a symmetrical five-bay front. Steps lead up to the central doorway that has a pediment. The windows are sashes with keystones, and at the rear is a full-height bow window. Attached to the building is a brick wall with cast iron coping and railings.	II
334 Glascote Road; 52.62764°N 1.67325°W	—	c. 1830	The house, which was extended later in the century, is in brick with a cornice and tile roof. There are two storeys, and three bays, the right bay later. The windows are small-paned casements; the windows in the ground floor and the doorway have segmental heads.	II
Shorthose Monument; 52.63417°N 1.69379°W	—	1830	The monument is in the churchyard of the Church of St Editha, and is to the memory of John Shorthose and his wife. It is a chest tomb in stone with inscribed slate side panels, reeded balusters, stone end panels, and a top slab with a moulded edge.	II
17 and 18 Lichfield Street; 52.63385°N 1.69936°W		1837	Originally a school, later used for other purposes, it is in brick with tile roofs. There are two parts at the front, both with coped gables, and extensions at the rear. The left part is painted, in the centre is an entrance flanked by smaller Tudor arched entrances with hood moulds and traceried spandrels. Over this is a window with intersecting tracery, a pointed head, and a hood mould, and there are three pinnacles. The right part projects slightly, and has a doorway with a cambered head, over which is a casement window with a segmental head.	II
Bolehall Viaduct; 52.63147°N 1.68652°W		1837–39	The viaduct was built by the Birmingham and Derby Junction Railway to carry its line over the valley of the River Anker, and was designed by Robert Stephenson and G. Bidder. It is in rusticated stone, and consists of 19 segmental arches. The viaduct has a modillioned cornice and parapet, round cutwaters, and abutments that sweep forward.	II
Monument, Church of St Editha; 52.63468°N 1.69506°W	—	1838	The monument in the churchyard is to the memory of six servants who died in a fire at the Castle Hotel. It is in stone, and consists of an obelisk on a square plinth with slate tablets on the sides.	II
2 Lady Bank; 52.63264°N 1.69788°W	—	c. 1840	A house, later an office, it is in brick with plaster dressings and a hipped tile roof. There are two storeys, one bay on the front, three bays on the side, and a rear outshut. Steps with railings lead up to a doorway on the left of the front that has panelled pilasters, a fanlight, and a hood on reeded brackets. The ground floor window is a small-pane casement, in the upper floor is a sash window, and both have wedge lintels and keystones. The windows on the side have segmental heads.	II
5 and 7 Lower Gungate; 52.63453°N 1.69334°W	—	c. 1840	A pair of shops in brick with a top cornice, a tile roof, two storeys, one bay each, and a rear gabled wing. Each shop has a 19th-century shop front, a doorway with a fanlight, and a fascia. No. 5 also has a bracketed cornice, and No. 7 has panelled pilasters. In the upper floor are sash windows.	II
Fazeley Junction House; 52.61562°N 1.70092°W		c. 1840	The house is near to Fazeley Junction, where the Birmingham and Fazeley Canal ends and joins the Coventry Canal. It is in brick with dressings in stone and plaster, a top cornice, and a hipped slate roof. There are two storeys and a symmetrical front of three bays, the middle bay occupied by a full-height canted bay window. The doorway is in the right return, and has a cornice on consoles, and the windows are sashes with rusticated wedge lintels and keystones.	II
9 Lady Bank; 52.63317°N 1.69754°W	—	1845	An office in buff brick with stone dressings, a stone plinth, a top cornice, a parapet, and a tile roof. There are two storeys, an L-shaped plan, a front of three bays, and a rear wing with a coped gable. The central doorway has a Tudor arched head, a hood mould, and cusped spandrels, and above is a narrow window. The outer bays contain two-storey canted oriel windows with moulded bases, and brattished cornices. Above them are gables containing the town coats of arms with mermaid supporters.	II
Former Peel School; 52.63408°N 1.69977°W	—	1850	The school, designed by Sydney Smirke and later used for other purposes, is in red brick with blue brick diapering, stone dressings, buttresses, and a tile roof with coped gables. It is in Tudor style, and has a rectangular plan, three bays, and a rear parallel range. The windows on the front have four lights and chamfered mullions, and above the middle window is a gablet containing an escutcheon. In the rear range are two hipped dormers.	II
Bowling Clubhouse and wall 52.63250°N 1.69824°W	—	Mid 19th century	The bowling clubhouse is in brick with stone dressings, a top cornice, and a tile roof. There is one storey and three bays, and the small-pane windows and doorway have plaster segmental arches with keystones. The wall to the left extends along the front of Brewery House. It is in brick with stone bands, stone coping, and is ramped up between piers that have stone capping.	II
Statue of Sir Robert Peel; 52.63310°N 1.69569°W		1853	The statue of Sir Robert Peel stands in front of the Town Hall. It was created by Matthew Noble, and consists of a bronze statue on a stone plinth. The statue is that of a figure in contemporary dress with a long cloak standing on a plinth with inscribed panels.	II
Amington Centre; 52.63643°N 1.65776°W	—	1863–64	A school, later a community centre, it was designed by G. E. Street and is in brick with a tile roof and cresting. There is one storey and five bays, the fourth bay protruding and gabled, and containing a segmental-headed window. The other windows rise above the eaves and have half-hipped gables. On the roof are two bell turrets, one square with a tile-hung base, open sides and a pyramidal roof, and the other with two posts and a flèche. At the rear is a parallel range.	II
St Editha's Church, Amington; 52.63794°N 1.65372°W		1864	The church, designed by G. E. Street, is in stone with tile roofs, and consists of a nave, a gabled south aisle, and a chancel with a south vestry and organ loft. On the east gable is a bell turret. Inside the church are stained glass windows by Edward Burne-Jones made by Morris & Co.	II
St Paul's Church, Dosthill; 52.59598°N 1.68812°W		1870–72	The church is in stone with a tile roof, and is in Early English style. It consists of a nave, a south porch, a chancel with a south vestry, and a south steeple. The steeple has a tower with buttresses and a broach spire with lucarnes. On the east gable of the nave is a bell turret, and the windows on the sides of the church are lancets.	II
Wall and railings, Lady Bank; 52.63276°N 1.69768°W	—	Late 19th century	The revetment wall runs along the west side of Holloway for about 92 metres (302 ft). It is in brick with chamfered stone coping. On the wall at intervals are brick piers with stone capping, between which are railings in cast and wrought iron with decorative scrolled panels.	II
St George's Church, Glascote; 52.62617°N 1.67710°W	—	1880	The church, designed by Basil Champneys, is built in brick with stone dressings and tile roofs. It consists of a nave, a north porch, a south aisle, and a chancel with a north vestry and a south organ chamber. At the crossing is a tower with buttresses, a round stair tower on the northwest, and a saddleback roof. In the gable of the roof is a three-light window, the sides of which rise to shafts and pinnacles. The gabled porch has a pointed archway with a moulded surround, above which is a niche containing a statue of Saint George with flanking pinnacles.	II
Assembly Rooms; 52.63452°N 1.69561°W		1889	The assembly rooms are in brick with stone dressings, bands, and a slate roof, and the building is in Italianate style. There are two storeys and an attic, a right angle plan, and a symmetrical front of five bays, the middle three bays projecting under a segmental pediment containing a coat of arms. In the ground floor three bays project further and contain doorways flanked by square columns, with balustrades above. In the upper floor are round-headed windows with archivolts, and the attic contains square-headed windows. The sides have seven bays, with similar windows in the upper floor.	II
37 George Street; 52.63341°N 1.69280°W		1898	A shop containing some 18th-century material, it is in brick with buff terracotta dressings, bands, and a tile roof with a coped shaped gable. There are three storeys and two bays. In the ground floor is a 20th-century shop front, banded piers, a bracketed entablature, and end finials. The middle floor contains two canted oriel windows with scrolled bases containing cartouches. In the top floor are two three-light windows with mullions, between them is a dated cartouche, and over them is a cornice with a central pediment. Above this is an elliptical recess containing terracotta voussoirs and a pinnacle.	II
Halifax Building Society, 22 Market Street; 52.63285°N 1.69497°W		c. 1900	The building is in stone, and has channelled rustication, a top entablature, and a balustraded parapet, and is in Edwardian Baroque style. It has a curved front consisting of six bays with one storey, and one bay to the right with two storeys. The left entrance has angle pilasters, an architrave, a frieze, and a cornice on consoles, and above it are two windows, a modillioned cornice, and on the roof is a cupola with a clock. The right entrance is simpler with an architrave, a pulvinated frieze and a pediment, and the cupola has a round window. Between them the bays have paired Tuscan three-quarter columns on a plinth, and round-headed windows with keystones.	II
Lloyds Bank, 17 George Street; 52.63280°N 1.69461°W	—	c. 1910	The bank is in brick with stone dressings, a rusticated plinth, a top entablature, a cornice with egg and dart decoration, a balustrade, and a slate roof with coped gables. There are two storeys and a symmetrical front of five bays. The left entrance has an architrave, a lettered frieze, and a doorway with an architrave, a fanlight, a frieze, and a cornice on consoles. The right entrance has an architrave with bead and reel moulding, a frieze, and a cornice on consoles, a doorway with a fanlight, and above is a panel. The windows are sashes with architraves, those in the ground floor also with friezes, and cornices on consoles.	II
Statue of Ethelfleda; 52.63243°N 1.69742°W		1913	The statue is in the grounds of Tamworth Castle, and commemorates Ethelfleda and her raising of the castle in 913. It is in ashlar stone with a granite base in the form of an octagonal seat. On this is a plinth with an inscription, a pier with a spiral pattern, and a moulded base to a capital with interlace carving, surmounted by the statue of Ethelfleda with a sword and a child.	II
War Memorial Cross, Amington Cemetery; 52.63562°N 1.65524°W	—	1917	The cross stands in the centre of the cemetery at the intersection of paths. It is in stone, and consists of an elaborate cross fleury on a short, square tapering shaft, on the base of three steps. There are sloping stones by the bottom steps with plaques recording the names of those lost in the First World War.	II
