= Bolehall =

Village in Staffordshire, England

Coordinates: 52.62°N 01.69°W

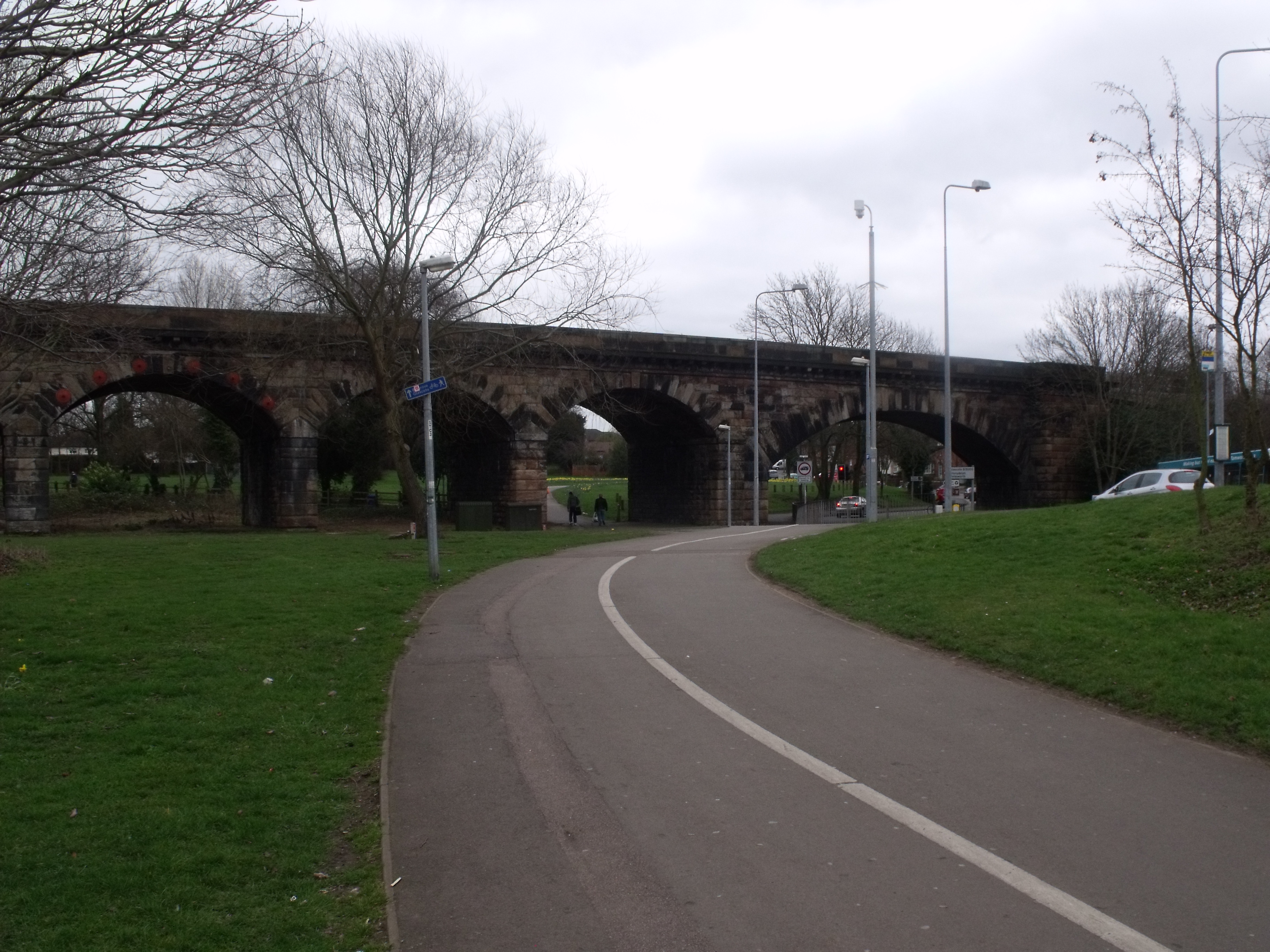
- Bolehall Viaduct

- Location within Staffordshire
- OS grid reference: SK2103
- District: Tamworth
- Shire county: Staffordshire
- Region: West Midlands
- Country: England
- Sovereign state: United Kingdom
- Post town: Tamworth
- Postcode district: B77
- Dialling code: 01827
- Police: Staffordshire
- Fire: Staffordshire
- Ambulance: West Midlands
- UK Parliament: Tamworth

Bolehall is a village in Staffordshire, England, part of the Tamworth Conurbation. The village sits on the south bank of the River Anker. The parish of Bolehall and Glascote, was historically part of Warwickshire.

== History ==
The manor of Bole Hall is first recorded in 1390 when it was owned by Lord John de Clinton and his wife Elizabeth, who held it after John's death. Following Elizabeth's death in 1423, the manor passed to the Earl of Warwick. The manor was reported as being in ruins by 1515.

In 1782, the manor passed to the Viscount Townsend of the nearby Tamworth Castle. The manor was purchased by the Corporation of Tamworth in 1897 with the castle.

== Notable places ==
- Bolehall Viaduct - Known locally as 'The 19 Arches' - Grade II listed railway viaduct.

== See also ==
- Listed buildings in Tamworth, Staffordshire
