= Tamworth Castle =

Norman castle in Tamworth, Staffordshire, England

- Tamworth, Staffordshire, United Kingdom
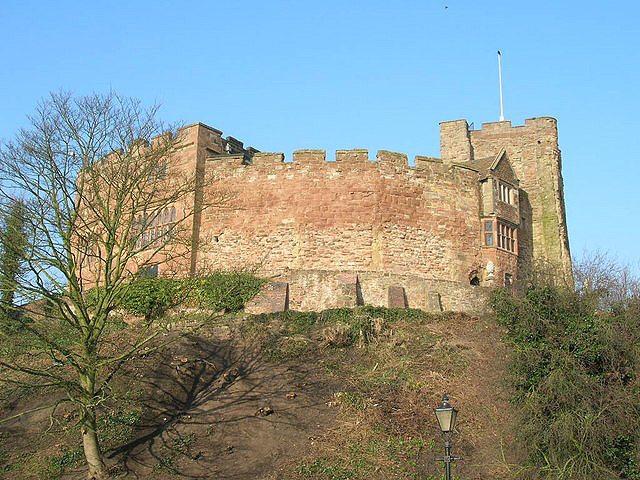
- Tamworth Castle

Site information
- Owner: Tamworth Borough Council
- Open to the public: Yes

Location
- Location within Staffordshire
- Coordinates: 52°37′58″N 1°41′48″W

Site history
- Built: 1080s
- Built by: Robert Despenser

Tamworth Castle, a Grade I listed building, is a Norman castle overlooking the mouth of the River Anker into the Tame in the town of Tamworth in Staffordshire, England. Before boundary changes in 1889, however, the castle was within the edge of Warwickshire while most of the town belonged to Staffordshire.

The site served as a residence of the Mercian kings in Anglo Saxon times, but fell into disuse during the Viking invasions. Refortified by the Normans and later enlarged, the building is today one of the best preserved motte-and-bailey castles in England.

== History ==
When Tamworth became the chief residence of Offa, ruler of the expanding Mercian kingdom, he built a palace there from which various charters were issued sedens in palatio regali in Tamoworthige, the first dating from 781. Little trace of its former glory survived the Viking attack in 874 that left the town "for nearly forty years a mass of blackened ruins". Then in 913 Tamworth was rebuilt by Æthelflæd, Lady of the Mercians, who newly fortified the town with an earthen burh. This, however, did little to defend the place when it was again sacked by the Danes in 943.

Over the following centuries there is no more mention of Tamworth as a royal residence, although a mint there struck coins for later Anglo-Saxon kings and eventually for the new Norman monarch, William the Conqueror. The place was then granted to William's steward, Robert Despenser, who built a wooden castle during the 1080s in the typical Norman motte and bailey fashion. Occupying the south western part of the earlier burh, this was the forerunner of the present building.

When Robert died childless, the castle passed to his nieces, one of whom, Matilida, married Robert Marmion. The Marmion family, hereditary champions of the Dukes of Normandy and then of the new Kings of England, held the castle for six generations from c.1100 to 1294. It was during their occupancy that the castle began to be remodelled in stone, although on one occasion it was also in danger of being demolished altogether. Robert Marmion, 3rd Baron Marmion of Tamworth, deserted King John in 1215 during the turmoil of his reign. As a consequence, the king ordered Robert's son Geoffrey to be imprisoned, all of Robert's lands to be confiscated and Tamworth Castle to be demolished (slighted). The archaeologist Tom McNeill says it is unclear whether the order was followed, after John's death in 126 Robert's sons were able to regain their father's lands.

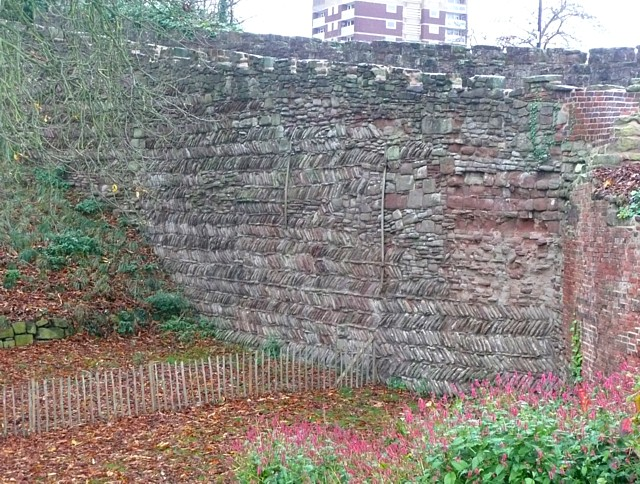
Early Norman herringbone masonry on the castle causeway

The last male of the family to own the castle was Philip Marmion. Since he had no legitimate sons, the castle passed on his death (c.1291) to his daughter and, after she died without an heir in 1294, to her niece Joan. As she was the wife of Sir Alexander Freville, Joan's descendants initiated the next dynasty of owners who held the castle until 1423. The male line then came to an end with Baldwin de Freville, whose son died a minor, and the castle passed to the eldest daughter, Elizabeth, and her husband, Thomas Ferrers of Groby.

Numerous additions were made to the castle over the centuries, especially in the Jacobean period, from which time the arms of the Ferrers family and those with whom they intermarried came to dominate the interior. The shell keep contains a 12th-century gate tower and later residential accommodation in an H plan comprising a 13th-century three-storey north range, and a 17th-century Jacobean three-storey south range linked by an oak timbered Great Hall of the 15th century. A notable exterior feature surviving from early times is the herring-bone pattern of masonry laid diagonally at the base of the causeway up to the gate tower.

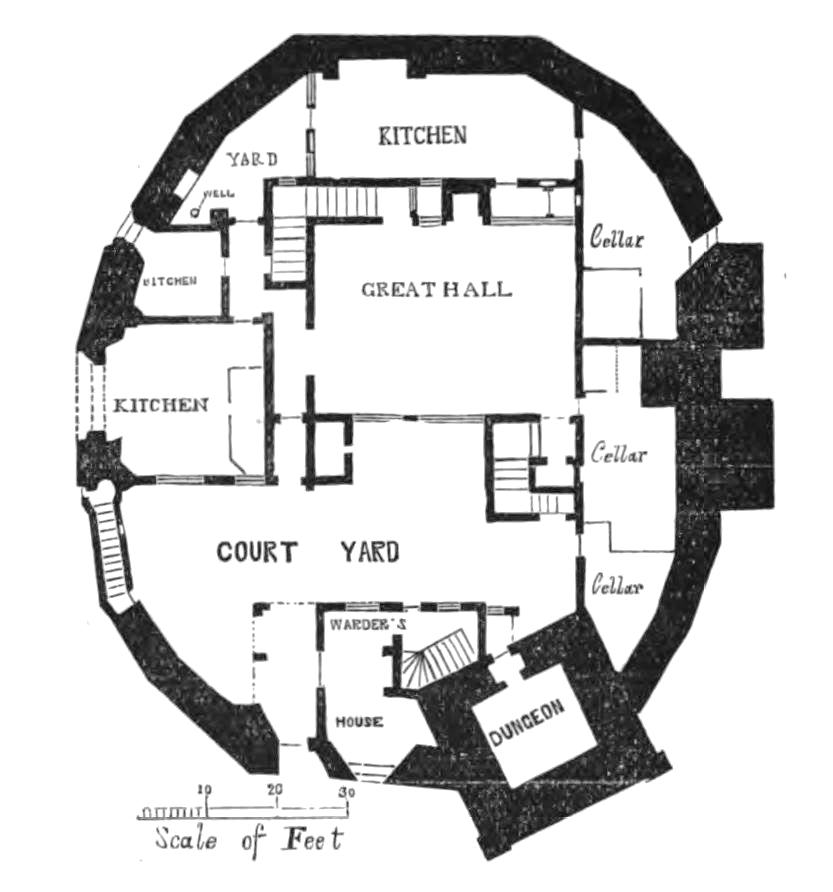
The ground plan of Tamworth Castle

=== The modern period ===
Originally entry to the castle grounds was by a gateway (little of which now remains) fronting onto the town's market-place. In his itinerary of Britain (1539/43), John Leland found the outworks "cleane decayed and the Wall fallen downe", although on the mound there remained "a great round Tower of Stone, wherein Mr [Humphrey] Ferrers dwelleth, and now repaireth it".

However adapted as a residence, the castle's defences had been built with the conditions of mediaeval warfare in mind. During the English Civil War, it was captured by Parliamentary forces on 25 June 1643 after only a two-day siege and was garrisoned by them. In July 1645 the garrison comprised ten officers and 77 soldiers under the command of the military governor, Waldyve Willington. Owing to this use, the castle therefore escaped the slighting ordered for so many others at that period.

After 1668 the castle passed to the relatives of the Ferrers, initially the Shirleys of Chartley and then in 1715 to the Comptons when Elizabeth Ferrers married the 5th Earl of Northampton. During their period of ownership, the castle again fell into disrepair but after the Ferrers grandniece, Charlotte Compton, had married George Townshend of Raynham, it was again refurbished. Following his death in 1811, the castle was acquired by an auctioneer, John Robbins in 1814, although he did not move in until 1821: ownership reverted to the Townshend family on his death.

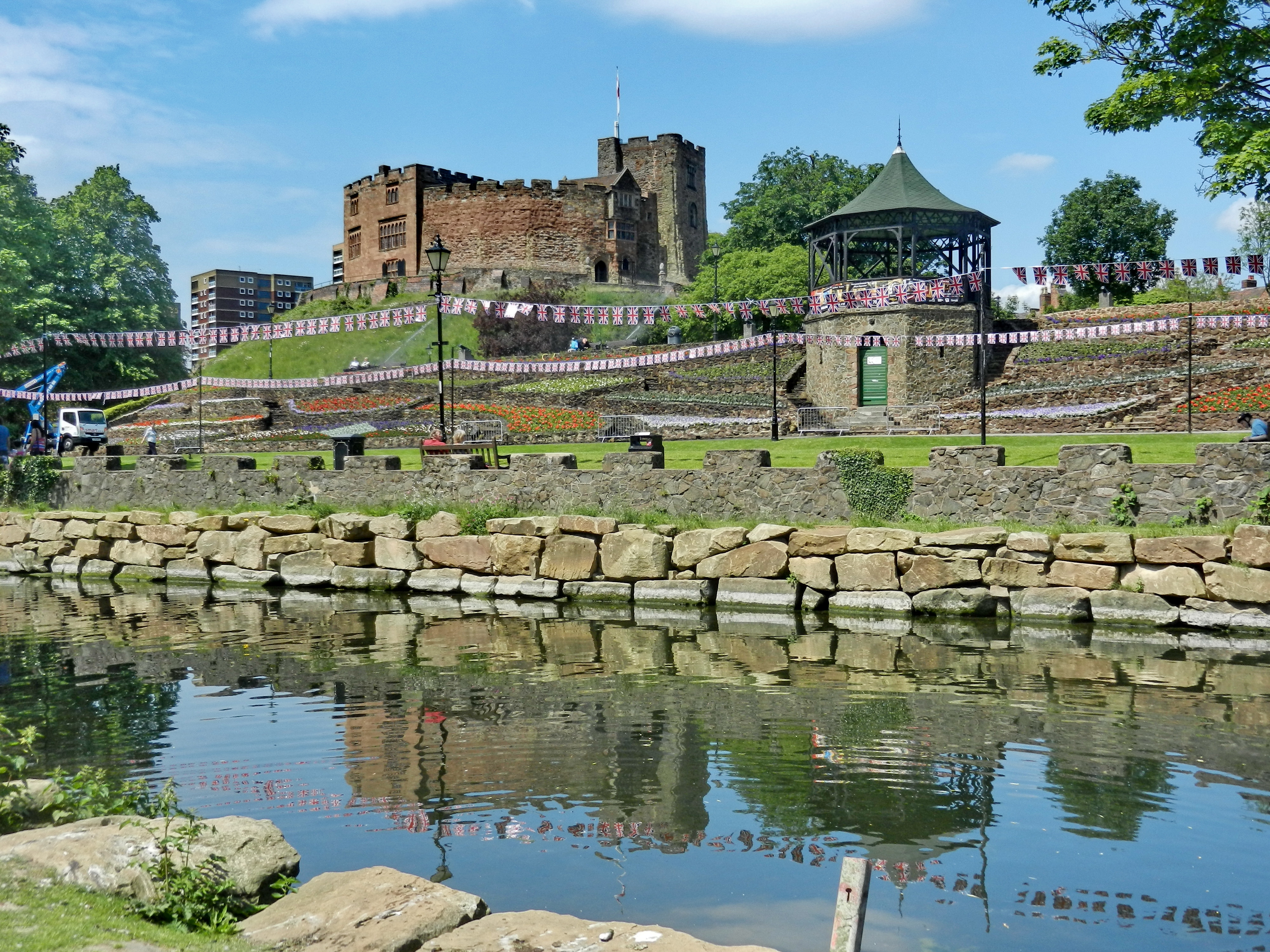
View of the bandstand, flower terraces and river bank in the Castle Pleasure Grounds

The moat on the town side had fallen into disuse and from the 15th century onwards parts of it were leased to the houses on that side of Market Street. In 1810 a new gatehouse was built at the foot of the Holloway, where the road ran south along the Lady Bridge. From it a carriageway wound up through the grounds to the castle's entrance. The castle mill was sited further along the Anker, where it was depicted in J. M. W. Turner's panoramic watercolour of the castle from the south-east (1832). Also included there is the Lady Bridge to the left and the square tower of St Editha's Church on the right.

The castle had earlier made a brief appearance in Walter Scott's narrative poem Marmion: A Tale of Flodden Field (1808). Set in Tudor times, its anachronistic anti-hero is proclaimed at the banquet in the first canto as "Lord of Fontenaye…Of Tamworth tower and town", although the barony of Marmion had by then been extinct for more than two centuries.

Finally in 1891 the Marquess Townshend put the castle up for sale by auction and it was purchased by its present owners, Tamworth Corporation (now Tamworth Borough Council), for £3,000 in 1897 to mark Queen Victoria's diamond jubilee. It was then opened to the public by the Earl of Dartmouth as a museum in 1899.

== Royal visitors ==
Royal visitors after the Norman Conquest:

- King Henry I, sometime between 1109 and 1115
- King Henry II, 1158, accompanied by Thomas Becket
- King Henry III, 1257
- King Edward II, 1325
- King Edward III, 1330
- King James I, 1619, accompanied by his son Prince Charles.
- Anne, Princess Royal in 1988

== See also ==
- Castles in Great Britain and Ireland
- List of Grade I listed buildings in Staffordshire
- Listed buildings in Tamworth, Staffordshire
- Mercian Trail
- Tamworth Castle Website
