= Dosthill =

Area of Tamworth, Staffordshire, England

Coordinates: 52.598°N 1.684°W

- Location within Staffordshire
- OS grid reference: SK215001
- District: Tamworth
- Shire county: Staffordshire
- Region: West Midlands
- Country: England
- Sovereign state: United Kingdom
- Post town: TAMWORTH
- Postcode district: B77
- Dialling code: 01827
- Police: Staffordshire
- Fire: Staffordshire
- Ambulance: West Midlands
- UK Parliament: Tamworth

Dosthill is an area of Tamworth, Staffordshire, 2.5 miles south of the town centre, and close to the River Tame. The area is mostly residential, centering on Dosthill High Street, with local employment on the adjoining Tame Valley Industrial Estate. The High Street includes a public house called 'The Fox' and Dosthill Primary School (photo) which dates back to 1887.

== Etymology ==
The name Dosthill is first attested in the Domesday Book of 1086, in the form Dercelai. The next attestations, more representative of subsequent examples, are Dercetehull and Dercetehille, found from 1195 into the thirteenth century. It has been proposed that the whole name originated in Old English, comprising the words déorcéte ("deer-shelter") and hyll ("hill"). But twenty-first-century scholarship has preferred the explanation that the first part of the name comes from the Common Brittonic words that survive in modern Welsh as derw ("oaks") and coed ("woodland"), referring to the adjacent wolds. This Brittonic name, thought to be found also in Avon Dasset and Burton Dasset was then extended by Old English-speakers with the element hyll.

== History ==
Dosthill is a small ancient hamlet and is mentioned in the Domesday Book. It has quickly grown in size up until recent centuries, when a large number of housing developments have been constructed. The area will continue to grow in size in the near future, with many more planning proposals in the pipeline and the area becoming more desirable to young families. Dosthill School was 125 years old in 2012

Until 1965 Dosthill was a village in the county of Warwickshire, associated with the larger village of Kingsbury, Warwickshire some three miles to the south. The county boundaries were altered in that year partly to accommodate the expanding town of Tamworth, Staffordshire and Dosthill became part of that town, moving into Staffordshire by default. The nearby hamlet of Whateley remained in Warwickshire. The county boundary is now at the southern edge of the village.

Originally most of the buildings in the area were agricultural. In the late 18th and 19th centuries the village was developed with the building of a number of farms and cottages. By the 20th century Dosthill had been transformed into a coalmining and brick making village.

There are 2 important historical buildings in the village which form part of a conservation area.

The oldest building is Dosthill Chapel, which is a Norman building that dates from the 12th century, but has some later additional architectural features. The building is now used as a Sunday school, day nursery and parish room.

Cruck Bern is one of the most important timber-framed buildings in the area and dates from the 15th century.

In 1870 St. Paul's Church was opened and replaced Dosthill Chapel as the principal place of worship. The building was designed by Edward Holmes of Birmingham. The church continues to be a functioning parish church. The foundation stone was laid by Farmer Cheatle, a member of one of the main four original families of Dosthill. The other three families are the Laytons, Tolsons and Tromans, descendants of whom still live in the village today. Dosthill Hall is also a building of historic significance. It is a Georgian mansion originally owned by the Tolson family. Some people have linked Dosthill Hall with Sir Robert Peel but Sir Robert Peel or the Peel family neither lived at Dosthill Hall nor ever owned it. The building and grounds have now been restored and converted into a number of apartments.

== Leisure ==
Dosthill is a popular place for scuba divers, water skiers and bird watchers.

A former quarry is now a diving centre and is considered to be the oldest inland dive site in the country. The quarry site consists of several submerged features for divers to explore, including numerous vans, caravans and other vehicles. There are also some good diving platforms for training. No other water activities such as fishing, water skiing, or the use of speed boats or jet skis are allowed on this site.

Greenhill Close was named after Florence Greenhill, a local nurse and midwife, who became known for delivering babies while bombs fell around her and her patients. After World War II she served for a time on Tamworth Town Council.

Dosthill Lake is home to the West Midlands Water Ski Centre and has been designated as a Site of Importance for Nature Conservation (SINC) due to its winter waterfowl populations, swamp vegetation and marshy grassland. From 2020 it is part of Dosthill Park Local Nature Reserve.

A public right of way to Middleton Lakes RSPB reserve, west of the river (and mostly in Warwickshire) exists, but the public bridge over the river collapsed and in 2016 was replaced close to the same site. Some pools east of the river are also part of the reserve.

== See also ==
- Listed buildings in Tamworth, Staffordshire
