= Borough Park =

Borough Park may refer to:

- Borough Park, Brooklyn, United States
- Borough Park (Workington), a football stadium in Workington, England
- Borough Park, Tamworth, a small residential area of Tamworth, Staffordshire, England
- Borough Park, Blackpool, a rugby league ground
