= St Paul's Church, Dosthill =

St Paul's Church, Dostill
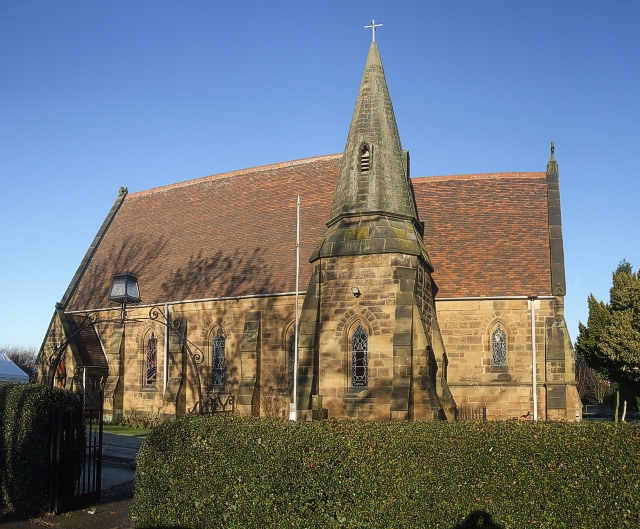
- St Paul's Church, Dostill
- St Paul's Church, Dostill
- 52°35′45.07″N 1°41′17.39″W
- OS grid reference: SP 21220 99839
- Location: Dosthill, Staffordshire
- Country: England
- Denomination: Church of England

History
- Dedication: St Paul
- Consecrated: 2 April 1872

Architecture
- Heritage designation: Grade II listed
- Architect: Edward Holmes
- Style: Early English Gothic
- Groundbreaking: 5 October 1870
- Completed: 1872

Administration
- Diocese: Anglican Diocese of Birmingham
- Archdeaconry: Aston
- Deanery: Polesworth
- Parish: Dosthill

St Paul's Church is a Grade II listed parish church in the Church of England in Dosthill, Staffordshire, England.

== History ==
The foundation stone was laid on 5 October 1870 by Mr. Farmer. The church was built between 1870 and 1872 to designs of the Birmingham architect Edward Holmes. George Lilley of Ashby-de-la-Zouch was chosen as the contractor. It was consecrated by the Bishop of Worcester on 2 April 1872.

Part of the burial ground was not ready until 1873, and the Bishop of Worcester returned on 22 September 1873 to consecrate it. It contains the war graves of a West Yorkshire Regiment private of World War I and a Royal Marines sergeant of World War II.

On 28 February 1992 it became a Grade II listed building, listed as "Church of St Paul".

== Organ ==
The organ was installed by Walter James Bird in 1914. It is a two manual and pedal organ of modest disposition of 8 ranks.
