= All Saints' Church, King's Heath =

All Saints' Church, Kings Heath
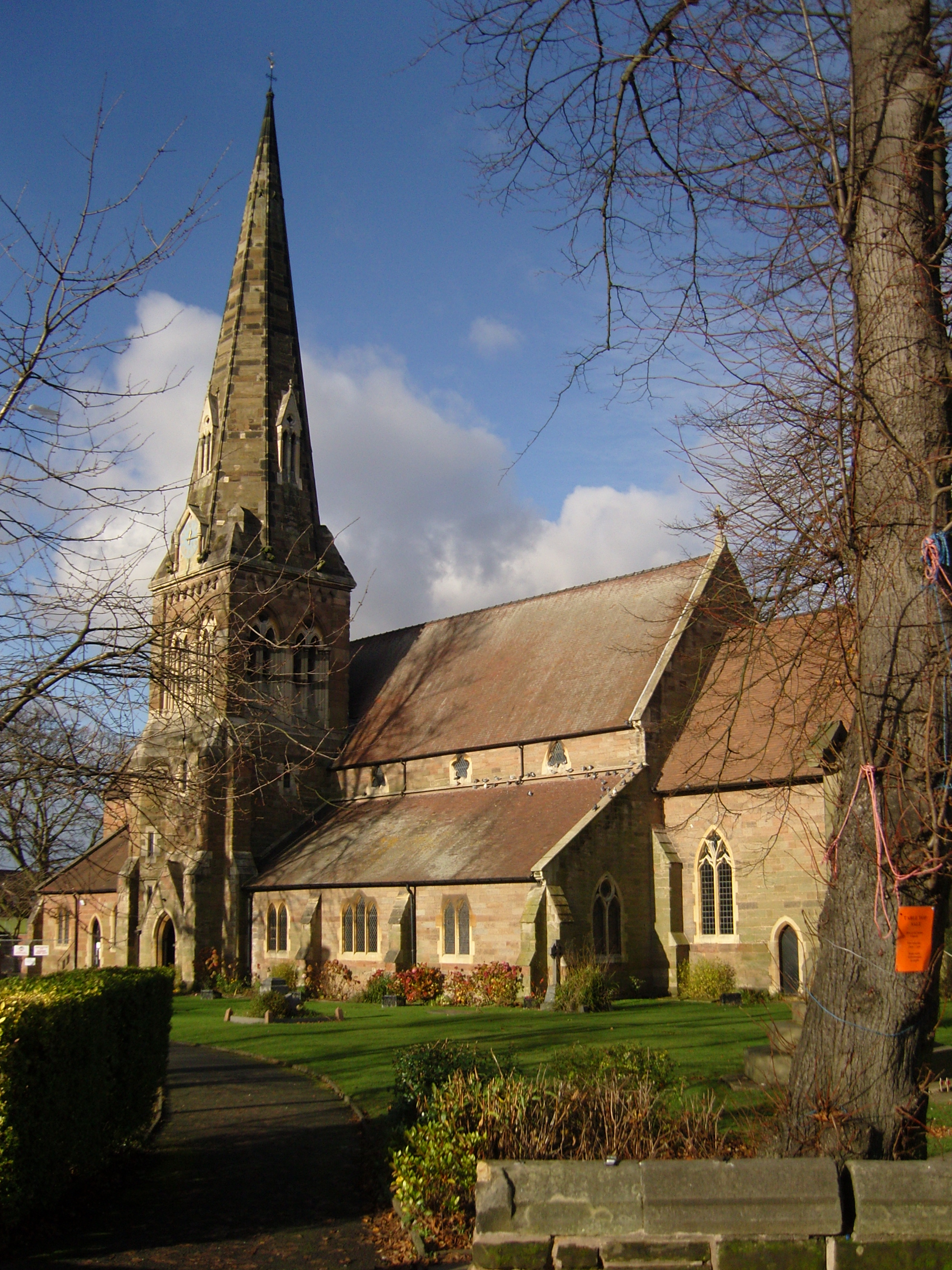
- All Saints' Church, Kings Heath
- All Saints' Church, Kings Heath
- 52.4331°N 1.8938°W
- OS grid reference: SP 07322 81685
- Location: King's Heath
- Country: England
- Denomination: Church of England
- Churchmanship: Broad Church/Liberal
- Website: website

History
- Status: Active

Architecture
- Functional status: Parish church
- Architect(s): Edward Holmes and Frederick Preedy
- Groundbreaking: 1859
- Completed: 1860

Administration
- Diocese: Diocese of Birmingham
- Parish: Kings Heath

All Saints' Church, King's Heath, is a Grade II listed Church of England parish in the Anglican Diocese of Birmingham.

== History ==
The church was constructed by Edward Holmes and Frederick Preedy in 1860. It was consecrated on 26 July 1860 by Henry Pepys the Bishop of Worcester. The spire was completed in 1866.

The north aisle, organ chamber and vestries were added in 1883 by J. A. Chatwin. The west end was enlarged in 1899 by J. P. Sharp.

== Organ ==
An organ was presented to the church around 1864 by Mr. Dawes. This was replaced in 1892 by an organ by Flight and Robson from St. John's Church, Blackheath, London.

In 1926 an organ by Nicholson and Co was installed. A specification of the organ can be found on the National Pipe Organ Register. This was replaced in 2008 by a Phoenix Digital Organ.

== Notable clergy ==
- David Monteith, now Dean of Leicester and Canterbury, served his curacy here from 1993 to 1997.
- Michael Parker, later Bishop of Bradford, was vicar from 1939 to 1957
