= Gillway =

Housing estate in Tamworth, Staffordshire, England

Coordinates: 52.647°N 1.699°W

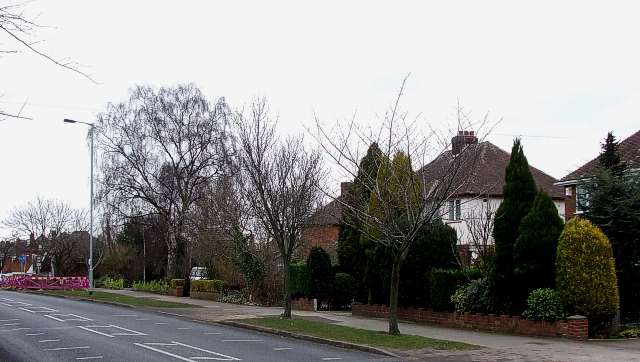
Comberford Road, bordering Gillway

Gillway is a suburb in Tamworth, United Kingdom built in the 1950s. It is a small suburb consisting of brick and concrete houses and two storey flats. It has a local school called Flaxhill and a pub called the Tam 'o' Shanter. It also has shops opposite the pub, and is near the Leyfields and the Perrycrofts estates.
