= Snowdome =

Coordinates: 52.62917°N 1.69187°W

SnowDome
- Interactive map of SnowDome

General information
- Type: Indoor ski slope
- Location: Tamworth
- Completed: May 1994

Design and construction
- Other designers: Tamworth council
- Main contractor: Europeople

The Snowdome is an indoor ski slope just off the A5 road in Tamworth, Staffordshire, England. It opened in May 1994 and was the first full-sized recreational indoor ski slope in the UK.

== Facilities ==
The slope is 170 metres (560 ft) long by 30 metres (98 ft) wide with an incline of around 1:7. There are also two serial 'travelator' lifts for access back to the top, and two rope-tows.

The Snowdome has a learner slope underneath the main slope. The main slope also holds regular 'ramp nights' in which several objects are added, including a gas pipe, mini rail and a quarter pipe.

There is also one ice rink and one ice track - the UK’s only - which circles the real Snow Fun Park and the ice rink with a number of other things.

The complex also contains a 25 metres (82 ft) swimming pool and gym—formerly known as Peaks Leisure Centre, but now owned and managed by the Snowdome as 'Snowdome Swim' and 'Snowdome Fitness' respectively. There is also a bar (Aspen's Bar and Kitchen), a shop Ellis Brigham, and a coffee shop on site.

== Hotel ==
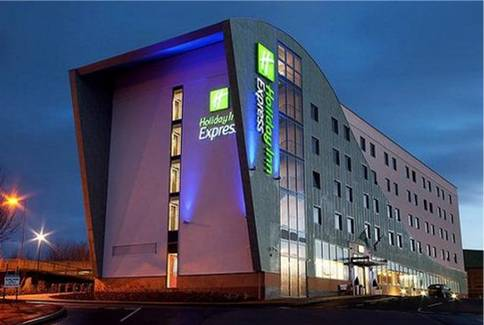
The Holiday Inn hotel at night

Construction work started in early 2009 for Sawley Cross properties to build a 120-bed, £7M hotel on land adjacent to the snowdome. The Holiday Inn Hotel opened in late November 2009.

In August 2024, the hotel was damaged as part of the 2024 United Kingdom riots. Windows were smashed and three Molotov cocktails were thrown. One police officer and three police dogs were injured.

== Incidents ==
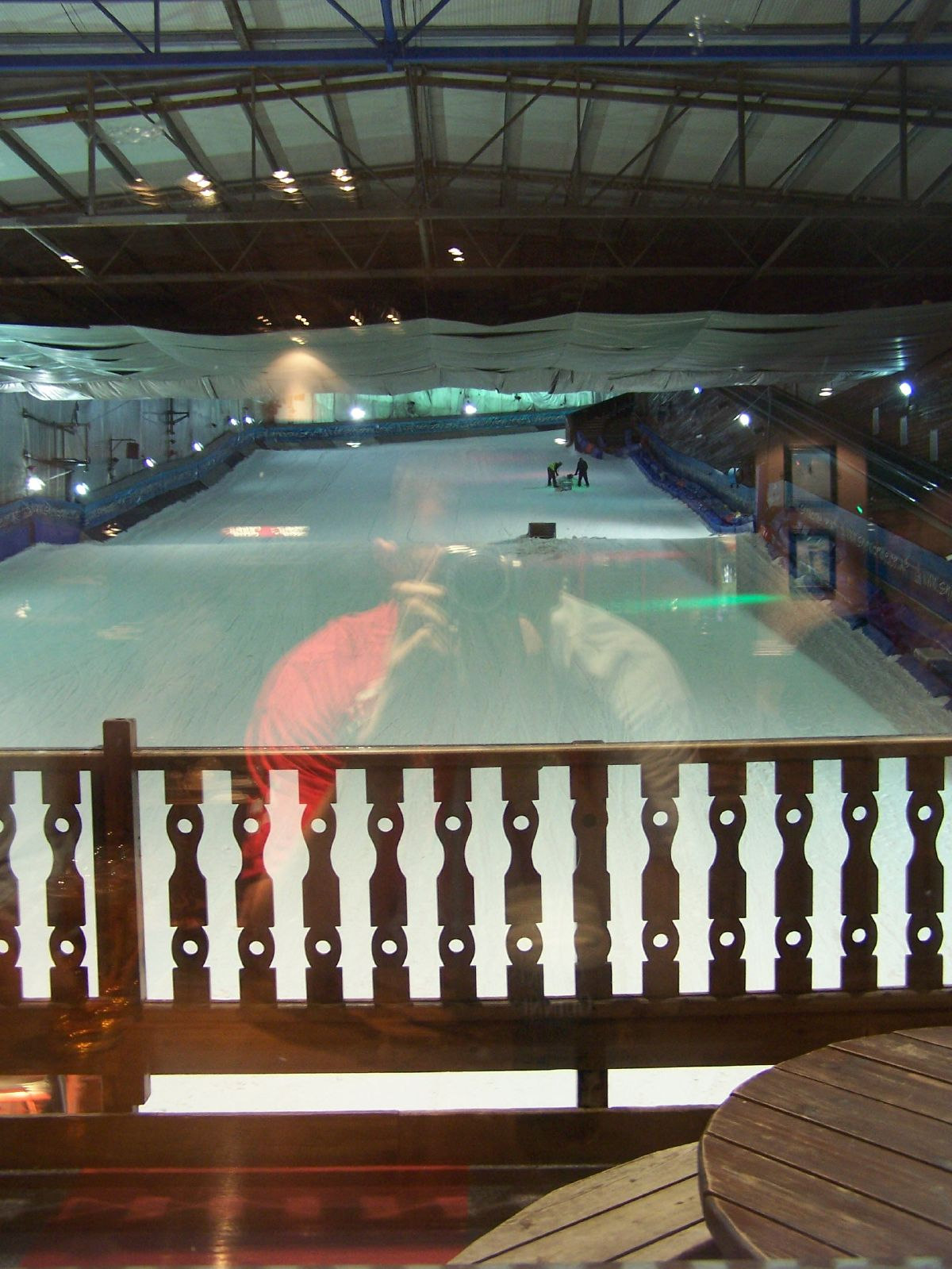
A view of the slope from Aspen's Bar

On 24 September 2021, a twelve-year-old boy died at the Snowdome after a collision with a member of staff at a tobogganing party. In September 2024, the operating company, Snowdome Limited, pleaded guilty to breaching health and safety regulations during a prosecution brought by the Health and Safety Executive at Telford Magistrates’ Court. In February 2025, the company was fined £100,000.
