= The Exchange, Birmingham =

Former commercial building in England

The Exchange
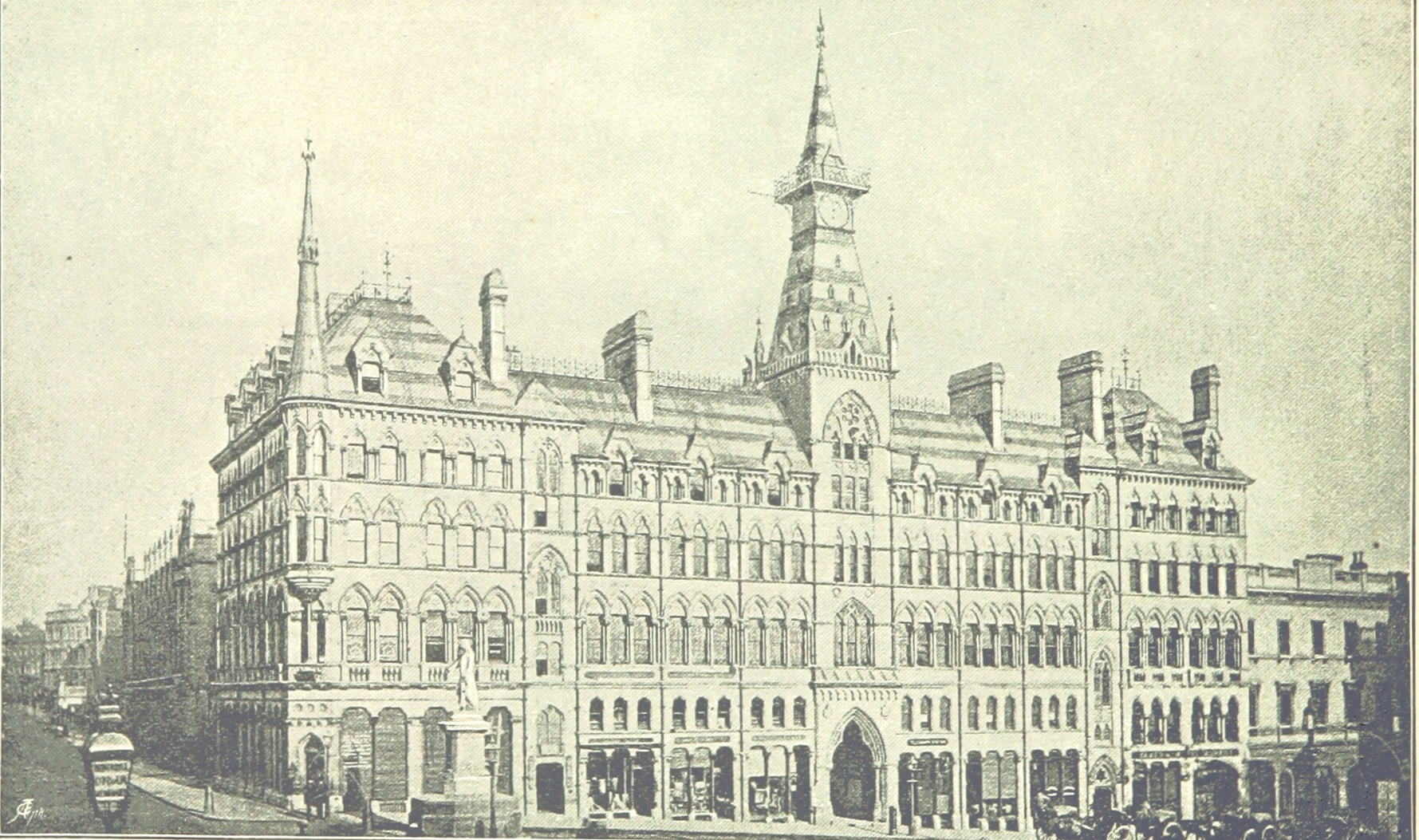
- The Exchange, fronting onto Stephenson Place
- Interactive map of the The Exchange area

General information
- Type: Commercial building
- Location: Stephenson Place, Birmingham, England, UK
- Coordinates: 52.478818°N 1.897759°W
- Opened: 2 January 1865
- Demolished: 1965

Height
- Height: 110 feet (34 m)

The Exchange was a large and prominent Victorian commercial building in central Birmingham, England, on the corner of New Street and Stephenson Place. It was among the many Victorian buildings lost during the 1960s redevelopment of Birmingham.

== History ==
It was built by a private company to the designs of Edward Holmes; construction began in 1863, and the building opened on 2 January 1865. The original cost was a little under £20,000 (equivalent to £2,080,000 in 2023),. It was later enlarged to nearly twice the original size between 1876-78 to the designs of J.A. Chatwin.

In 1879, the first telephone exchange in Birmingham was opened in the building by Henry J T Piercy, who founded the Midland Telephone Exchange Company. The use of the term 'telephone exchange' was taken up simply because of the building it was located in. By 1882 the telephone exchange had moved to new premises.

The building was demolished exactly a century after it opened, in 1965.

== Description ==
The building was constructed from honey-coloured Hollington stone. Its architectural style was Gothic. It had a frontage of 64 feet (20 m) onto New Street and 186 feet (57 m) onto Stephenson Place, and was adjacent to Birmingham New Street railway station.

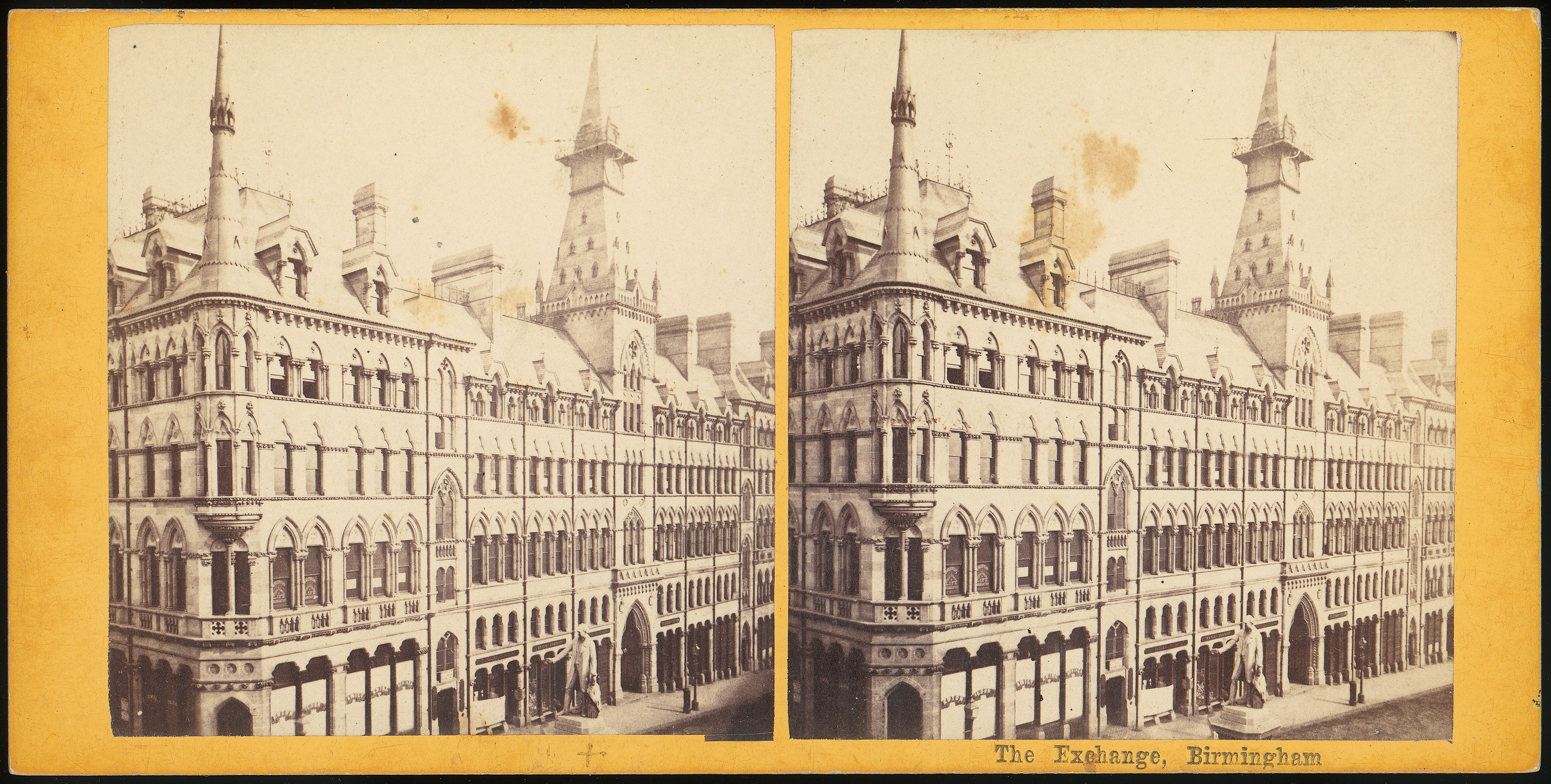
Old stereo card of the building

The building was multi-purpose, being home to a commodity exchange, which dealt mainly with iron and steel. It was also an important meeting place for those involved with the iron and steel industry. The Birmingham Chamber of Commerce was based in the building until it moved to new offices 1901. There was a large principal hall and assembly room, both measuring 70 feet (21 m) long, 40 feet (12 m) wide, and 23 feet (7.0 m) tall. The assembly room was frequently used for public entertainment purposes, such as balls, concerts, and other public entertainments. Other portions of the building were rented as offices.

The prominent central tower was 110 feet (34 m) high. This was topped by a turret, in which there was a clock made by John Inshaw, which was moved by electro-magnetic power.

== Replacement buildings ==
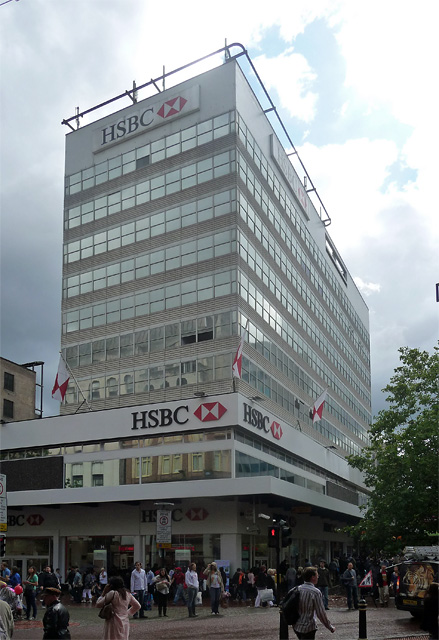
The 1960s replacement buildings, in 2011

It was replaced by a 1960s office and shop development known as the Exchange Buildings, built between 1965-67, and designed by Cotton, Ballard & Blow. This building houses among other things a HSBC bank, and a 140 bedroom Premier Inn Hotel.
