= Leyfields =

Housing estate in Tamworth, England

Coordinates: 52.6421°N 1.7056°W

- Housing estate
- Location within Staffordshire
- Unitary authority: Staffordshire; Tamworth
- Shire county: Staffordshire
- Region: West Midlands
- Country: England
- Sovereign state: United Kingdom
- Post town: TAMWORTH
- Postcode district: B79
- Police: Staffordshire
- Fire: Staffordshire
- Ambulance: West Midlands
- UK Parliament: Tamworth

Leyfields is a housing estate in Tamworth, Staffordshire, consisting of 3-storey flats, maisonettes, bungalows and houses. It was built in the 1960s as a postwar housing estate. It joins the Gillway estate and Coton Green.

The estate has a Methodist church, a Community Centre, shops, and Wigginton Park, the home to Tamworth RUFC.

Leyfields is also part of the Staffordshire County Council division of Perry Crofts, and the Tamworth Borough Council ward of Mercian.
