= Bitterscote =

Coordinates: 52.6274°N 1.7005°W

Bitterscote is an area of Tamworth, Staffordshire. It is close to the town centre and contains major retail outlets in a development known as Ventura Park.
