= Tamworth, Staffordshire =

Town in Staffordshire, England

Tamworth
- Town and borough
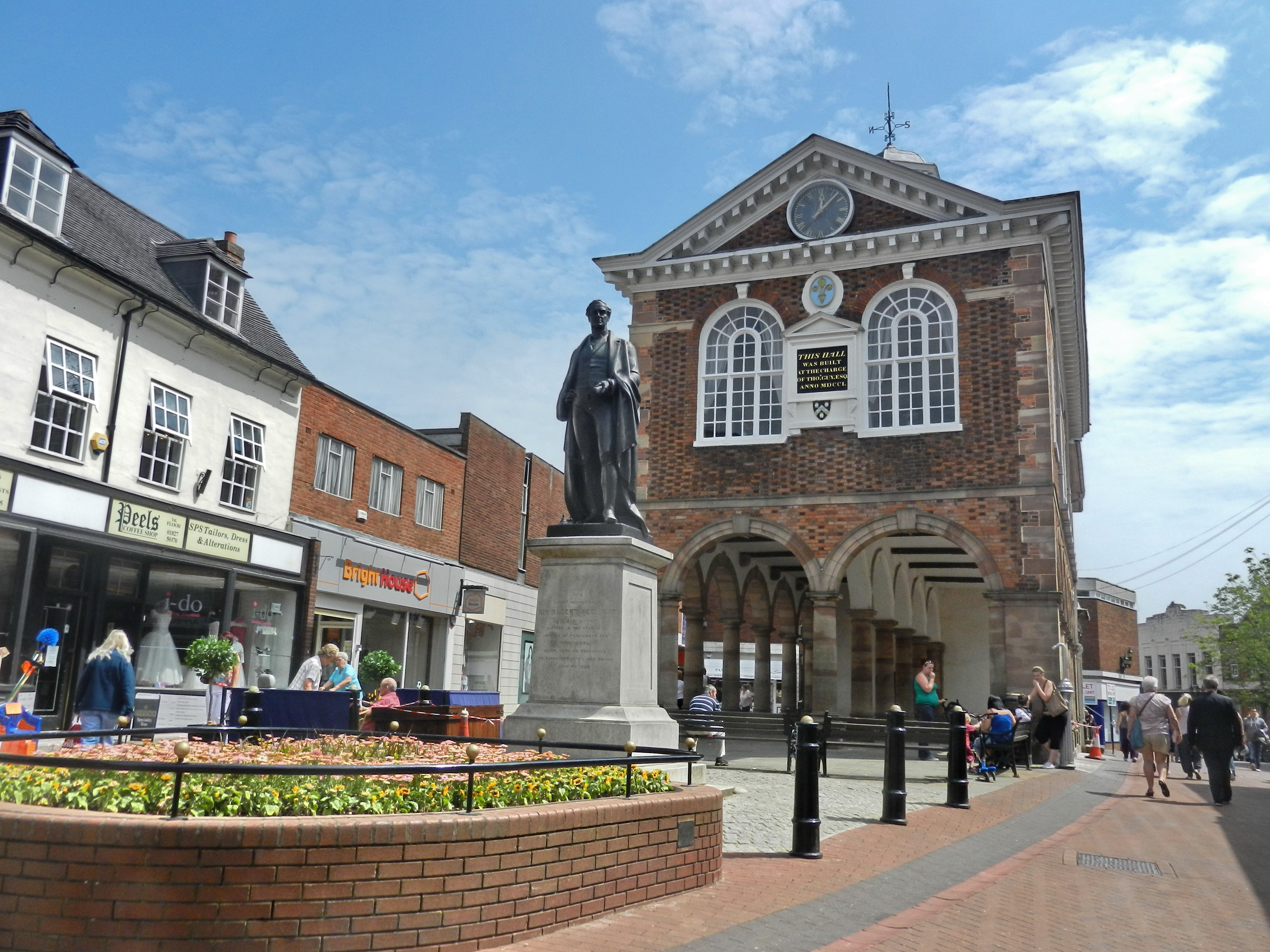
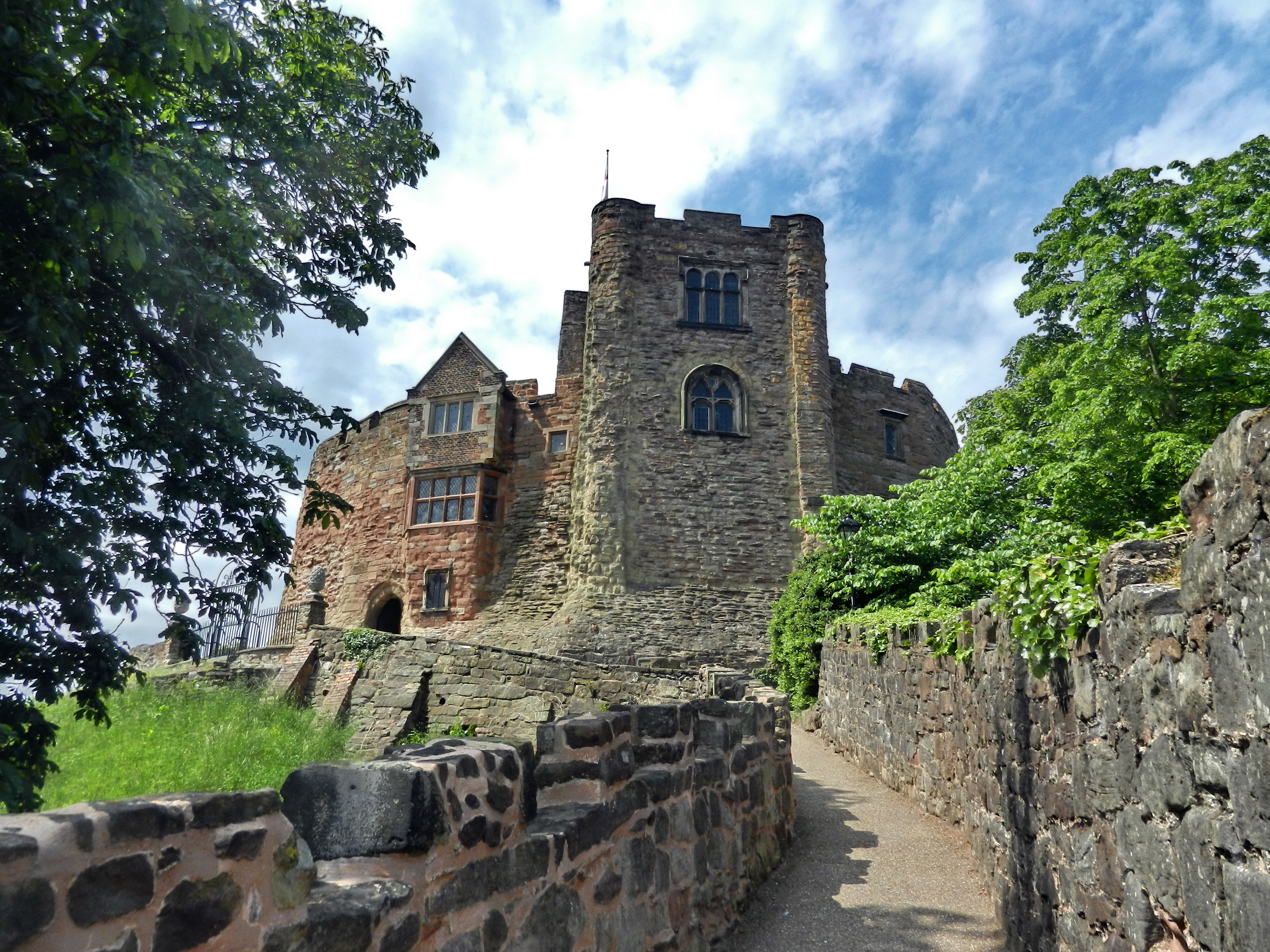
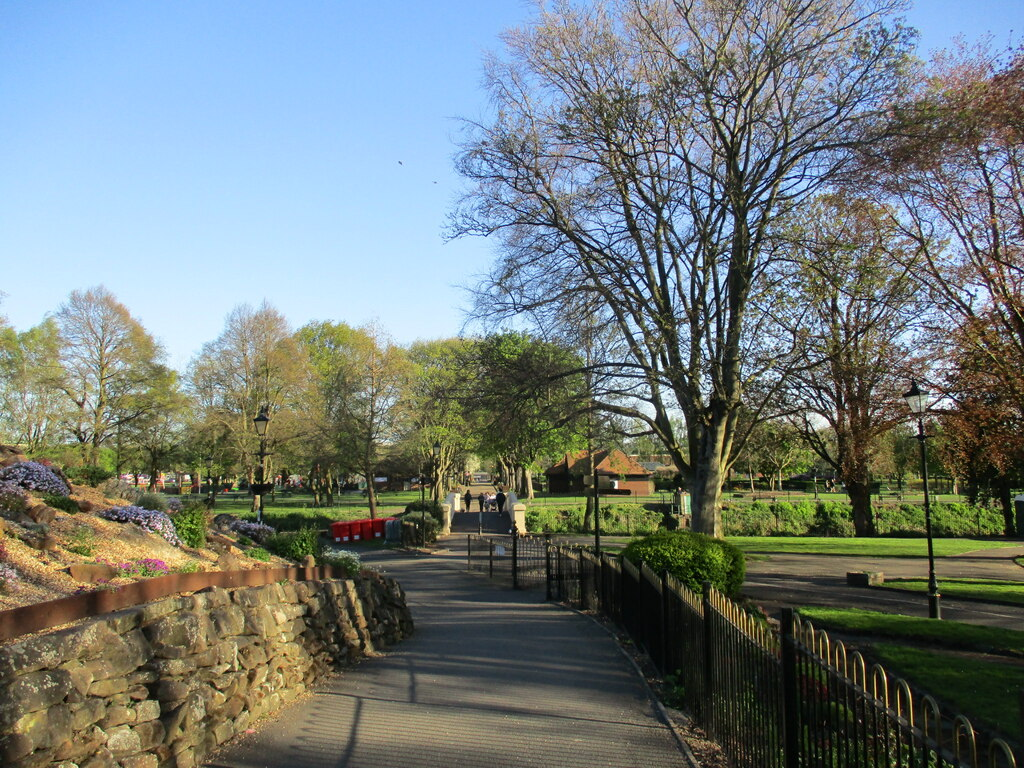
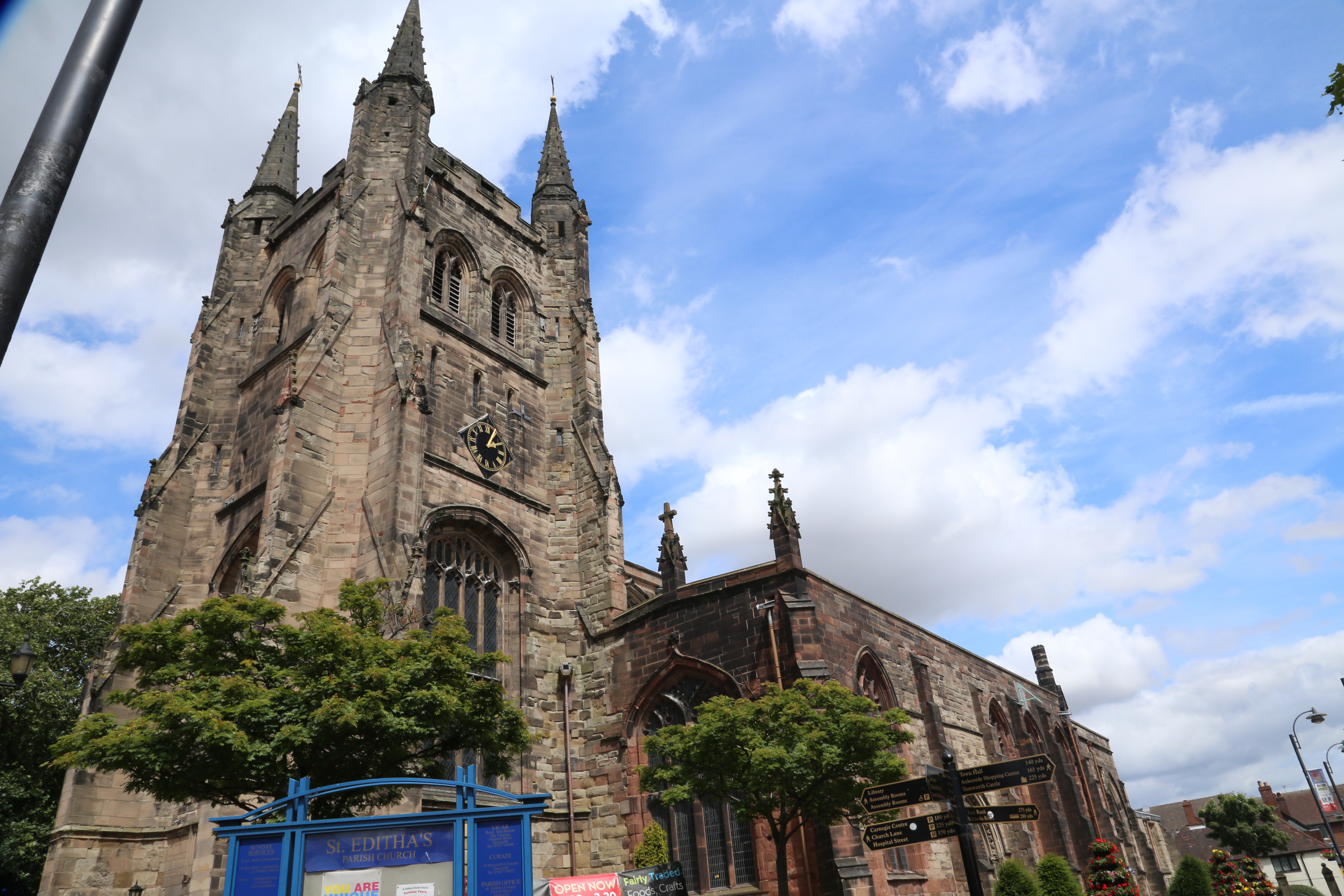
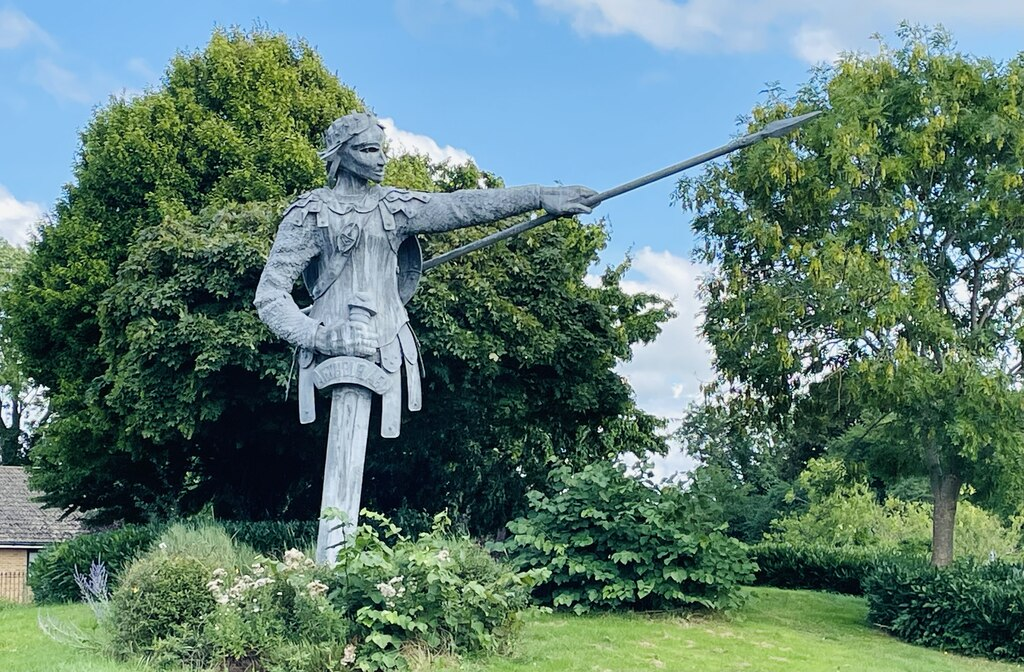
- Town Hall and statue of Robert Peel Tamworth Castle Castle Grounds Church of St Editha Æthelflæd Monument

- Tamworth shown within Staffordshire
- Coordinates: 52°38′2″N 1°41′42″W
- Sovereign state: United Kingdom
- Constituent country: England
- Region: West Midlands
- Non-metropolitan county: Staffordshire
- Status: Non-metropolitan district
- Admin HQ: Tamworth
- Incorporated: 1 April 1974
- Suburbs of the town: List: Amington; Belgrave; Bitterscote; Bolehall; Borough Park; Coton Green; Dosthill; Gillway; Glascote; Leyfields; Perry Crofts; Stonydelph; Wilnecote

Government
  - Type: Non-metropolitan district council
  - Body: Tamworth Borough Council
  - Council Leader: Carol Dean (Labour)
  - MPs: Sarah Edwards (Labour)

Area
  - Total: 11.91 sq mi (30.85 km^{2})
  - Rank: 278th (of 296)

Population
  - Total: 78,653 (2,021)
  - Rank: 281st (of 296)
  - Density: 6,603/sq mi (2,550/km^{2})

Ethnicity (2021)
  - Ethnic groups: List: 95.8% White; 1.9% Mixed; 1.4% Asian; 0.6% Black; 0.3% other

Religion (2021)
  - Religion: List: 51.6% Christianity; 46.6% no religion; 0.5% Islam; 0.3% Buddhism; 0.4% other
- Time zone: UTC0 (GMT)
  - Summer (DST): UTC+1 (BST)
- Postcode: B77-B79
- Post town: tamworth
- Area code: 01827
- OS grid reference: SK207040
- Website: tamworth.gov.uk

Tamworth (/ˈtæmwərθ/, /ˈtæməθ/) is a market town and borough in Staffordshire, England, 14 miles (23 km) north-east of Birmingham. The town borders North Warwickshire to the east and south, and the Lichfield District to the north, southwest and west. The town takes its name from the River Tame, which flows through it. The population of Tamworth borough (2025) was 81,392. The wider urban area had a population of 81,964.

Tamworth was the principal centre of royal power of the Anglo-Saxon Kingdom of Mercia during the 8th and 9th centuries. It hosts a simple but elevated 12th century castle, a well-preserved medieval church (the Church of St Editha) and a Moat House. Tamworth was historically divided between Warwickshire and Staffordshire until 1889, when the town was placed entirely in Staffordshire.

The town's industries include logistics, engineering, clothing, brick, tile and paper manufacture. Until 2001 one of its factories was Reliant, which produced the Reliant Robin three-wheeler car and the Reliant Scimitar sports car.

The Snowdome, a prototype real-snow indoor ski slope is in Tamworth and 1.7 miles (2.7 km) south is Drayton Manor Theme Park and one of the many marinas serving the Coventry Canal and Birmingham and Fazeley Canal which combine south of the town.

== History ==
=== Romans ===
When the Romans arrived in Britain, (43–409 CE) the Trent Valley was home to the British Coritani tribe. Evidence of Roman activity in the area of Tamworth consists of fragments of Roman building materials found near Bolebridge Street. Tamworth was near the Roman road, Watling Street and a few miles from the Roman town of Letocetum.

=== Anglo-Saxon ===
Following the end of Roman rule, the area around the Tame valley was occupied by Anglo-Saxons from northern Germany and Jutland. Stephen Pollington states that the settlers that reached Tamworth were Angles, who left their homelands after rising sea levels flooded much of the land. Britain offered an attractive option as its landscape was similar to their homelands, but was more fertile and had a more moderate climate. The Angles arrived from the north, navigating inland via the River Humber, River Trent and the River Tame.

The settlers established themselves in "an open meadow by the Tame" which they called Tomworðig. Nearby they established an "enclosed estate" called Tomtun – Tame-town – fortified with a palisade wall. These people called themselves the Tomsaete: Tame-settlers. Tomtun was initially "not much more than a fortified manor". The settlement straddled the River Anker and contained a "large hall for public gatherings" as well as individual homes and agricultural buildings such as stables and granaries. The Lords of Tame-Settlers quickly became wealthy and Tamworth was thus able to be fortified further.

The Tomsaete were a military tribe; however, soldiers eventually reached an age where they retired from military duty and were then allotted parcels of land to farm, manage and defend. Fertile lands surrounding the rivers were allotted first, then the hill lands; this land spreading further and further, spreading the power and influence of the tribes. The Tomsaete were one of countless tribes "all vying for power and influence", however the Lords of the Tomsaete came to control and to "dominate" the area known as English Midlands. The tribes initially ruled through unions and alliances of leading families and there is evidence of contact with families across England and also back in the Anglo-Saxon homelands. However, this "warlord" form of government developed and the Tomsaete's lands became a Kingdom with a single leader.

==== Mercian 'capital' ====
The Tomsaete lived in the heartland of what by the late 6th century had become the Kingdom of Mercia, the largest of the kingdoms in what is now England. A fortress built by King Creoda would later, under King Penda in the 7th century, become the most powerful. The King was not static and would not have a single residence; instead he travelled round his territories "to be seen by his people, to give legal judgments, to reward loyalty and to try offenders". Tamworth was probably a stopping place on the royal circuit, becoming a royal vill from the seventh century, with an early minster church and river crossing. It was fortified as a burh in the late 8th century, with an earthen rampart and timber palisade surrounded by a ditch.

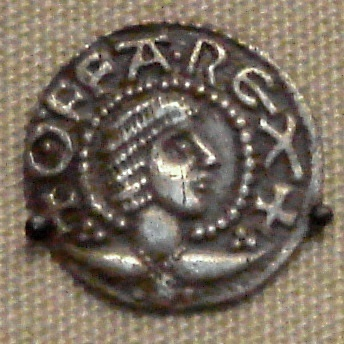
Coin depicting the head of King Offa

By the end of the 8th century it had been established by King Offa of Mercia (757–796) as the stable centre of royal power for his expanding political ambitions – more like a capital than had previously been seen anywhere in Anglo-Saxon England. One of the earliest surviving written records mentioning Tamworth dates from Offa's reign; a grant of land to monks at Worcester dating from 781, signed by Offa, King of Mercia, addressed from his royal palace at Tamworthie. Offa built what was described as a Royal palace at Tamworth, however this was almost certainly a timber and thatch construction (as were most buildings in Anglo-Saxon England) which left little physical trace, and so the location of Offa's palace has never been identified, although excavations north of Bolebridge Street in 1968 revealed what appeared to be the outline of a large Saxon building.

Between 790 and 850 Tamworth was the main location for the signature of Mercian royal charters. In 868 the Great Heathen Army invaded England and in 874 they drove out King Burgred, who fled to Rome. Tamworth was then a frontier town between Viking ruled east Mercia and Anglo-Saxon ruled west Mercia until 913, when Æthelflæd, Lady of the Mercians, made Tamworth her capital, and re-fortified the town against Viking attacks. (Note: Popular histories state that the Vikings burnt Tamworth in 874, but this is not supported by historians of Anglo-Saxon England, and Frank Stenton in his classic history of the period states that no details are known of the war which drove Burgred from his throne.) Æthelflæd led a successful military campaign to win back territory from the Danes, driving them back to their stronghold at Derby which was then captured. She died at Tamworth on 6 June 918.

During the reign of Æthelstan (924–939) the Kingdom enjoyed a period of relative peace and prosperity. In Tamworth church in 926, a sister of King Æthelstan, perhaps Saint Edith of Polesworth, was married to Sitric Cáech, the squint-eyed Norse King of York and Dublin. It was during this period that a mint was established at Tamworth producing silver coins, many stamped with the name of a local moneyer called Manna. Many coins produced in Tamworth during this period have appeared in Scandinavian museums, as much of it was used to pay Danegeld, a tribute paid in an attempt to buy off invading Vikings. This however proved fruitless, as following Æthelstan's death in 939, Tamworth was again plundered and devastated by Viking invaders led by Sitric's son Olaf (later called Amlaíb Cuarán). It was soon recovered and rebuilt by Æthelstan's successors, but Tamworth never regained its pre-eminence as a Royal centre.

In the early 10th century the new shires of Staffordshire and Warwickshire were created, and Tamworth was divided between them, with the county border running through the town centre along the streets of Gungate, Church Street, Silver Street and Holloway, with the castle on the Warwickshire side of the border. The reason for this division was probably so that the town would be divided between the two separately administered Hundreds of Offlow and Hemlingford to ensure that sufficient manpower would be available to man the town's defences.

=== Norman and Medieval ===
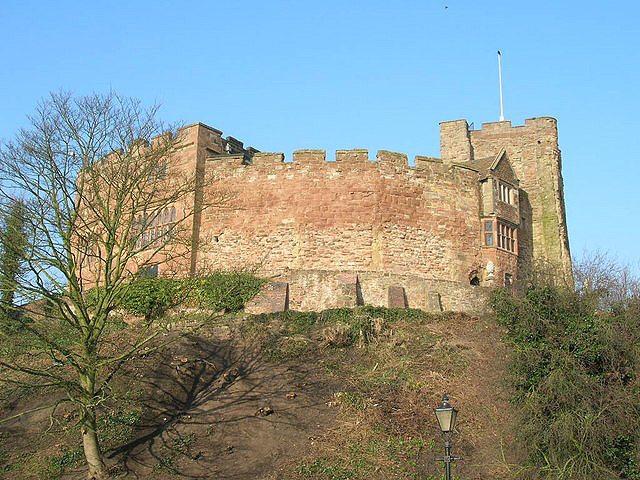
Tamworth Castle

Following the Norman conquest of England in the 11th century, the Normans built a large motte and bailey castle, the forerunner of the present Tamworth Castle, partly on the site of the Saxon fort which still stands to this day. Unusually Tamworth wasn't mentioned in the Domesday Book; this may have been due to its division between two counties confusing the surveyors.

From around 1093, the Marmion family became lords of the manor, and eight generations of Marmions inhabited Tamworth Castle until 1294. It was the Marmions who were largely responsible for building the present sandstone fort at Tamworth Castle, replacing the original wooden Norman structure. During the period of The Anarchy in the 12th century, Robert Marmion supported King Steven in his fight with Empress Matilda. In the ensuing struggle, Tamworth Castle was taken and occupied by the forces of Matilda, but was returned to the Marmions when Steven finally prevailed in the war. In 1215 King John threatened to have Tamworth Castle destroyed, in revenge for the 3rd Baron Marmion's support for the baronial revolt against the King. However, this threat was not carried out.

In the Middle Ages Tamworth was a small market town. However, the king gave it charters in 1319. In 1337 Tamworth was granted the right to hold two annual fairs. In the Middle Ages fairs were like markets but they were held only once a year and they attracted buyers and sellers from great distances. In 1345 Tamworth suffered a disastrous fire, and much of the town burned. This was followed by the Black Death which arrived in England from 1348, which reduced the population by at least a third. However, the town eventually recovered from these disasters.

In 1877 a hoard of silver pennies of William I and William II was found during construction of the town's board school. Many were minted in Tamworth. 294 coins were recovered, approximately four or five having been sold by the finder before the hoard's significance was realised. Many of the coins are now in the British Museum.

=== 16th and 17th centuries ===
Queen Elizabeth I granted Tamworth another charter in 1560 confirming the town's existing rights and privileges, and incorporating it as a unified borough with a single municipal corporation. Prior to this there had been separate corporations for the Warwickshire and Staffordshire sides of the town. The charter enabled Tamworth to elect a representative to Parliament. Another charter was granted in 1588, further consolidating the town's rights of self-government.

Tamworth suffered from outbreaks of plague in 1563, 1579, 1606, and 1626. Many died but each time the population recovered.

James I, the first Stuart king of England, visited Tamworth on three occasions, with his first visit in 1619, and was accommodated by Sir John Ferrers at Tamworth Castle. The king was accompanied by Prince Charles (the future king Charles I), who was entertained by William Comberford at the Moat House.

During the English Civil War from 1642, Tamworth Castle was initially garrisoned for the Royalists under William Comberford, however in June 1643 it was captured by a detachment of Parliamentarian forces under the command of William Purefoy after a short two-day siege, and remained in Parliamentarian hands for the remainder of the conflict, despite unsuccessful attempts by Royalists who controlled nearby Lichfield to recapture it. In 1646, a large Parliamentarian force, backed by soldiers from Tamworth captured Lichfield after a four-month siege. After the conflict was over, the castle was again threatened with destruction, when an order was issued for it to be destroyed, but again this was not carried out.

Tamworth continued to grow and remained one of the most populous towns in the Midlands by 1670, when the combined hearth tax returns from Warwickshire and Birmingham list a total of some 320 households. Its strategic trade advantage lay with control of the two vital packhorse bridges across the Anker and the Tame on the route from London to Chester. As today, a market town, it did a brisk trade providing travellers with at least staple bread, ale and accommodation, maintaining trading links as far afield as Bristol. Charles II's reconfirmation of its borough's privileges in 1663 gave the town an added boost, as confirmed by Richard Blome's description of its celebrated market, well served with corn, provisions and lean cattle.

=== 18th and 19th centuries ===
In 1678 the town's future Member of Parliament Thomas Guy founded almshouses in Tamworth, rebuilt in 1913. He also commissioned Tamworth Town Hall in 1701 and founded Guy's Hospital in London in 1721.

The town grew rapidly in the 18th and 19th centuries during the Industrial Revolution, benefiting from the surrounding coal mines. The late 18th century saw further improvements in the local transport infrastructure, and the beginnings of industrialisation: In 1770 the Tamworth Turnpike trust was established, which set about making improvements to the roads in and around the town. In 1777 the Trent and Mersey Canal was completed, running to within a few miles of Tamworth. In 1790, this was linked to the Coventry Canal which was completed through Tamworth, linking Tamworth to the growing national canal network, a junction was soon made between this and the Birmingham and Fazeley Canal at Fazeley, just south of Tamworth.

==== Influence of the Peel family ====
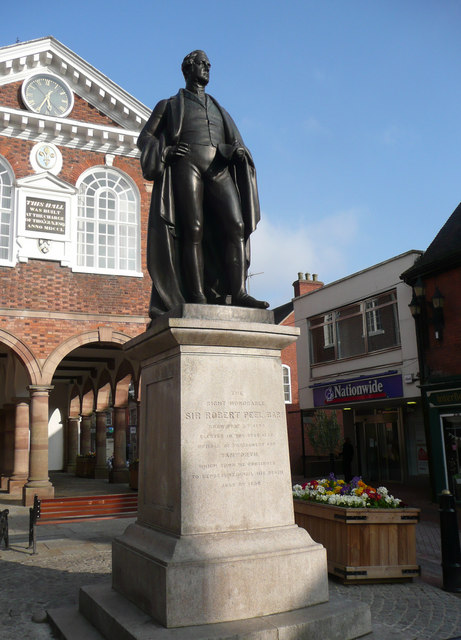
Statue of The Right Honourable Sir Robert Peel

Robert 'Parsley' Peel (1723–1795) a Lancashire cotton mill owner was the first member of the Peel family to become established in the area. Peel had become well known for producing textiles with a parsley leaf design, this led him to becoming known as 'Parsley' Peel. After his mills in Lancashire were damaged by riots, Peel moved his mill operations to Burton upon Trent in Staffordshire in 1780, attracted in part due to the improving local transport systems.

His son, Sir Robert Peel, 1st Baronet (1750–1830) played a major role in developing Tamworth's economy, he established the first cotton mills in Tamworth in 1788, one of which, known as 'Castle Mill' was based in Tamworth Castle. Textiles soon became Tamworth's main industry. Peel also established several banks in Tamworth. Peel moved permanently from Lancashire, and set up home in Drayton Manor just outside Tamworth in the 1790s. He became the town's Member of Parliament in 1790, and remained so until 1820. He used his parliamentary influence to improve the working conditions in factories.

By far the most famous member of the Peel family, was his son Sir Robert Peel, 2nd Baronet (1788–1850) who rose to become one of the most famous Prime Ministers of the Victorian era, and served as the town's Member of Parliament from 1830 until his death in 1850. He lived at the nearby Drayton Manor. It was in Tamworth that Robert Peel unveiled his Tamworth Manifesto in 1834 which created what is now the modern Conservative Party. While Home Secretary, Peel helped create the modern concept of the police force, leading to officers being known as "bobbies" or "Peelers". Peel is commemorated in Tamworth by a statue in front of the town hall, which was produced by Matthew Noble in 1852.

==== Improvements ====
There were a number of improvements to Tamworth during the 19th century. In 1807 the pavements were flagged. In 1809 a new church entrance was completed and a new organ erected funded by public subscriptions (source see 1809 Parish Records). From 1835 Tamworth had gaslight. In the late 19th century a piped water supply was created.

The railways arrived in 1839 with the Birmingham and Derby Junction Railway (B&DJR) (later Midland Railway) route from Derby to Birmingham. In 1847 the London and North Western Railway opened the Trent Valley Railway, which provided direct trains to the capital. A split-level station exists where the two main lines cross each another, the higher-level platforms (on the Derby to Birmingham line), being at right angles to the lower ones on the main line to London.

The first municipal cemetery opened in 1876. The Assembly Rooms were built in 1889. In 1897 the corporation bought Tamworth Castle.

A hospital was built in Tamworth in 1880 and was funded by one of the town's greatest benefactors, William MacGregor, at his own expense. An infirmary was built in 1903. MacGregor also built two churches at Glascote and Hopwas and had the bells at St. Editha's church recast. He also started a free library, a working men's club, a school (now called William MacGregor School) and started the Co-operative Society in the town in 1885 acting as guarantor.

Tamworth was historically divided between Warwickshire and Staffordshire, with the county boundary running along the town centre. The boundary was re-drawn following the Local Government Act 1888, which created county councils. The Act decreed that urban areas, such as Tamworth, which were situated in more than one county, should transfer entirely into the county which contained the larger portion of the population at the 1881 census: in Tamworth's case, the Staffordshire part of Tamworth Borough contained 2,589 people and the Warwickshire part, 2,032, therefore Tamworth became part of Staffordshire from 1 April 1889.

During the 19th century the Tamworth pig, a long-bodied, heavily bristled breed, was first sold here by cross-breeding pigs available locally with imported Irish stock.

=== Modern history ===
The first council houses in Tamworth were built in 1900. More were built in the 1920s and 1930s and after 1945.

The first public library in Tamworth was built in 1905. Tamworth gained an electricity supply in 1924.

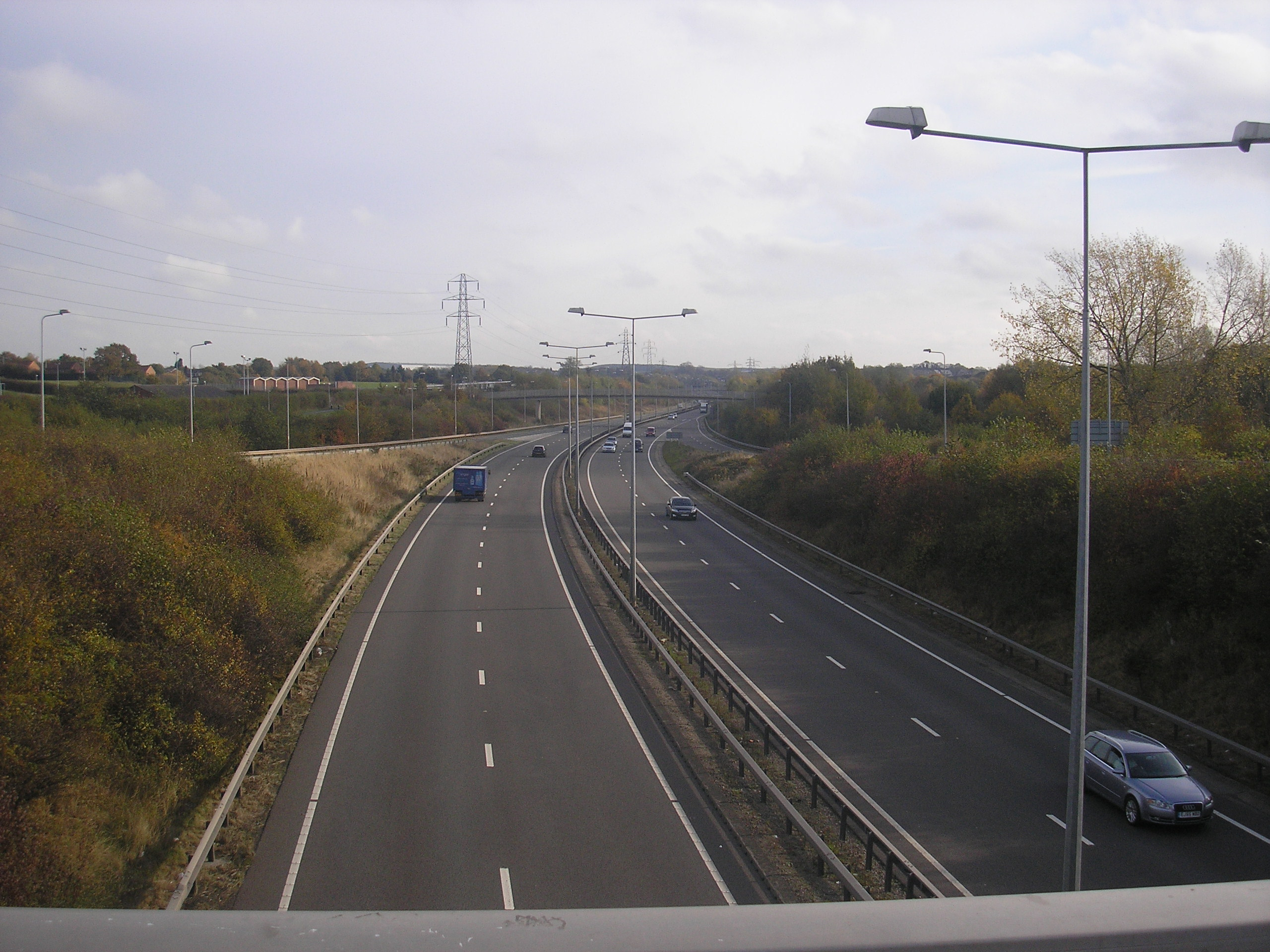
The A5 (Thomas Guy Way) passing through Tamworth, looking south from Glascote

Tamworth grew rapidly in the postwar years as it soaked up overspill from the West Midlands conurbation to the southwest. A population of about 7,000 in 1931 had risen to some 13,000 just after the Second World War; this figure remained fairly static until the late 1960s when a major expansion plan was implemented. Although not officially a "New Town", Tamworth's expansion resembled the development of many new towns. As part of this plan the town boundaries were expanded to include the industrial area around Wilnecote to the south. The 1961 population of the new enlarged area was 25,000. In 1971 it was 40,000; in 1981, 64,000; in 1991, 68,000 and in 2001, 72,000, meaning that the town's population had almost doubled within 30 years.

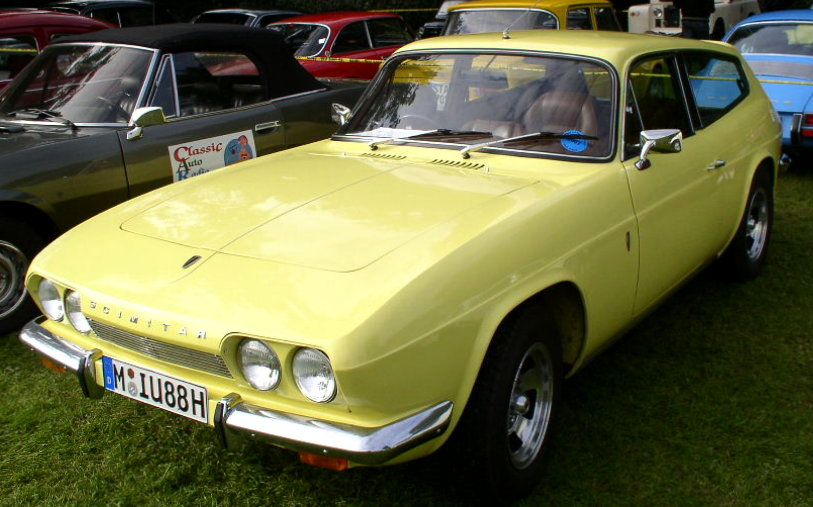
MHV Reliant Scimitar GTE 01

The Reliant Motor Company was founded in Tamworth in 1935 by T. L. Williams and E. S. Thompson, and cars such as the Scimitar four wheeled sports cars and the Robin three wheeled economy cars were manufactured here until the company moved to Cannock in 1998. A year later the old factory was razed to the ground and a new housing estate built in its place called "Scimitar Park" with street names assuming names of Reliant vehicles (e.g. Robin Close).

The A5 dual-carriageway Fazeley, Two Gates and Wilnecote Bypass opened in July 1995, acting both as a bypass of Watling Street, and as a fast route for traffic into the town. This was further extended to meet the M6 Toll and A38 in 2005. The road's official name is Thomas Guy Way.

Tamworth has six designated Local Nature Reserves, Hodge Lane (Amington), Kettlebrook, Tameside, Dosthill Park, Warwickshire Moor and Broadmeadow, which became the newest nature reserve in April 2013.

=== Historic population ===
Year	1801	1831	1851	1881	1901	1911	1931	1951	1961	1971	1981	1991	2001	2011
Population*	3,870	7,128	8,671	12,166	13,985	19,256	20,111	22,780	25,074	39,725	65,200	70,500	74,600	76,895

* population figures based on current borough boundaries.

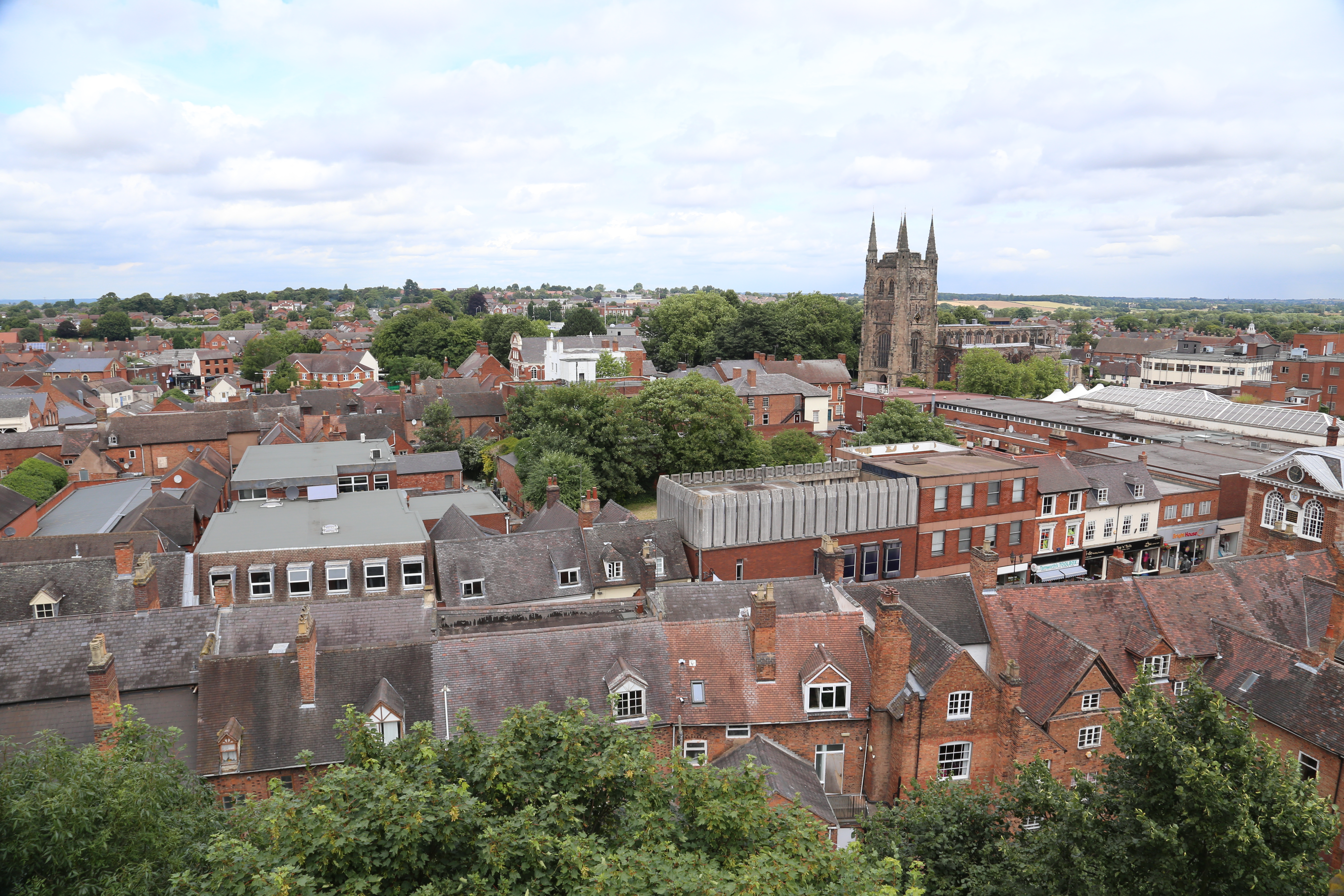
Tamworth town centre seen from the castle

== Geography ==
Tamworth is located at the confluence of the rivers Tame and Anker, which meet just south of the town centre. Tamworth is on the southeastern tip of Staffordshire, with the Warwickshire border just 3 miles (4.8 km) east of the town centre. The Derbyshire and Leicestershire borders are 6 miles (9.7 km) to the north-east.

Tamworth's built-up area includes the far smaller town of Fazeley which is to the south-west of Tamworth, on the opposite bank of the River Tame. Fazeley is not part of Tamworth borough, instead it is administered as part of the Lichfield District. The built-up area of Tamworth and Fazeley was recorded as having a population of 81,964 in the 2011 census.

Tamworth is 13 miles (21 km) north-east of Birmingham city centre and 6 miles (9.7 km) from the Lichfield city centre. Other nearby places include Polesworth, Atherstone and Sutton Coldfield, with Nuneaton, Burton upon Trent, Walsall and Rugeley a bit further afield.

=== Suburbs ===
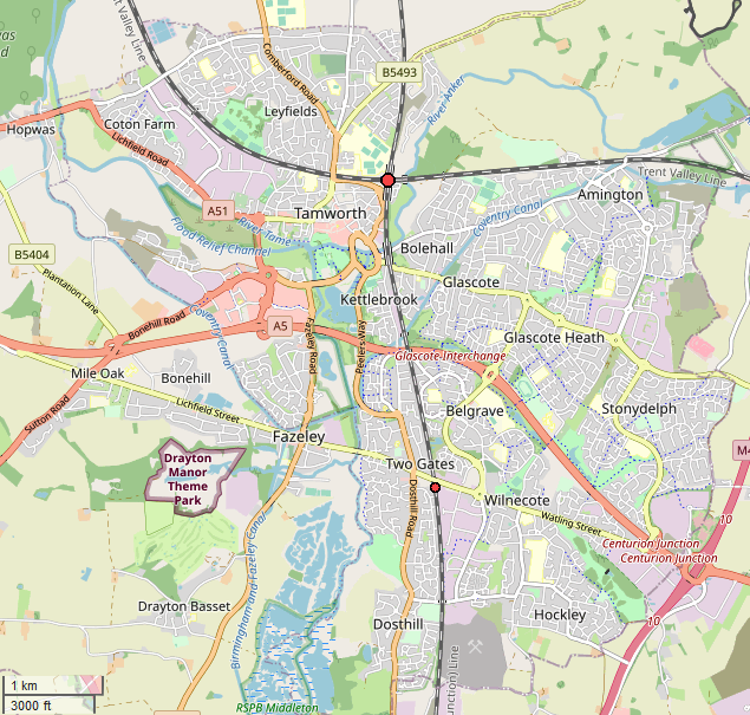
A map of Tamworth and Fazeley

Tamworth has a number of suburbs:

- Amington
- Belgrave
- Bitterscote
- Bolehall
- Borough Park
- Coton Green
- Dosthill
- Gillway
- Glascote
- Glascote Heath
- Hockley
- Kettlebrook
- Lakeside
- Leyfields
- Perry Crofts
- Quarry Hill
- Riverside
- Stonydelph
- The Alders
- The Leys
- Two Gates
- Wilnecote

== Demography ==
According to the 2011 census the borough has a population of 76,900. White British is the predominant ethnicity, then 97% of the population. The second largest ethnicity is White Irish, making up 0.9%. 95% of people in the borough were born in England, with Scotland ranking next, with 1% of the population.

Tamworth was in 2013 the most overweight town in the UK with a 30.7% obesity rate.

== Governance ==
Tamworth Borough is administered by a Council which has been Labour-led since 2024 and was Conservative-led from 2004 to 2024. No part of the borough has a civil parish. On Staffordshire County Council, Tamworth has six divisions, all of which were held by the Conservatives as of 2017.

Since 2011, Tamworth has formed part of the Greater Birmingham & Solihull Local Enterprise Partnership along with neighbouring authorities Birmingham, Bromsgrove, Cannock Chase, East Staffordshire, Lichfield, Redditch, Solihull and Wyre Forest. Tamworth is also a non-constituent member of the West Midlands Combined Authority.

The Council retains a cabinet system of governance.

Under current local government reorganisation plans, all district councils in Staffordshire, as well as the county council, will be abolished in 2028, with Tamworth borough being abolished and merged into a new South and Mid Staffordshire unitary authority. Tamworth is an unparished area, as of 2026 it is consulting on whether to form a civil parish for the town (and thus a town (parish) council).

=== Elections ===
Tamworth Council elects by thirds meaning there is an election of 1 councillor for each of the wards every year for three years but the fourth year see elections to Staffordshire County Council. Councillors are elected for a four-year term.

The Borough is used as the starting point of the extent of the Westminster seat of Tamworth, which is held by Sarah Edwards for Labour since the 2023 by-election held after the resignation of former MP Chris Pincher.

== Health ==
Tamworth has a minor hospital called Sir Robert Peel Hospital which is located in Mile Oak. The Sir Robert Peel Hospital has a Minor Injuries Unit.

Tamworth is part of the South Staffordshire and Shropshire Healthcare NHS Foundation Trust.

Castle Grounds is also home to Tamworth Castle Grounds parkrun, a free timed 5km running and walking event held every Saturday at 9am.

== Religion ==
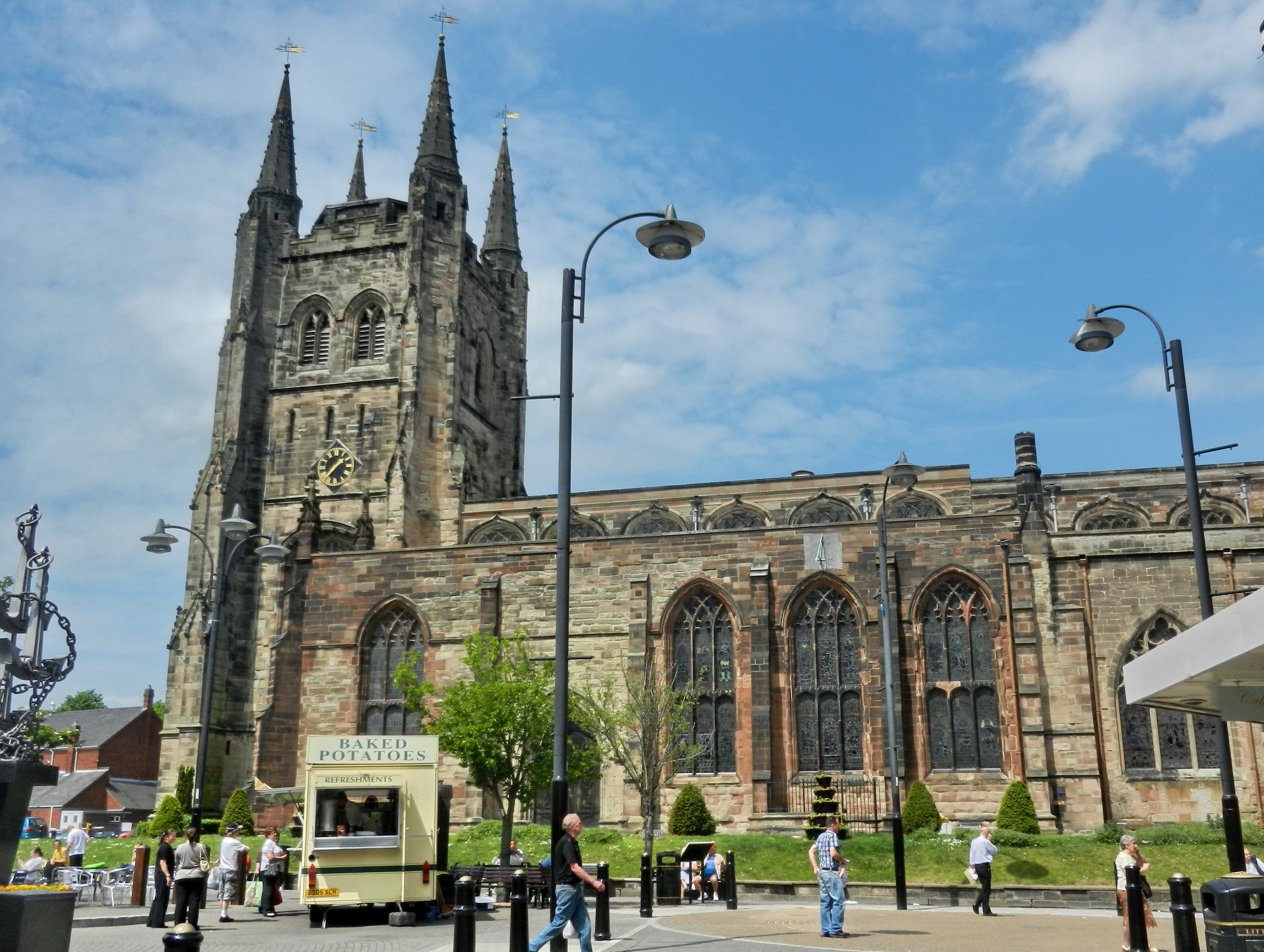
St Editha's Church

Christianity is the largest religion in Tamworth, comprising 77% of the population. 15% are not religious. Other religions include Hindu (177), Islam (127) and Sikhism (124) which make up 0.9% of the population.

=== Church of England ===
The parish church of Tamworth is the Church of St Editha in the town centre, which is one of the town's prominent and oldest landmarks being a grade I listed building. Most of Tamworth is part of the Diocese of Lichfield, the two parishes being Tamworth and Wilnecote. However Amington is in the parish of Amington St. Editha which is part of the Diocese of Birmingham.

=== Roman Catholicism ===
Tamworth is in the Roman Catholic Archdiocese of Birmingham; the main Roman Catholic church is St John the Baptist on St John Street in the town centre, the other Roman Catholic church is Sacred Heart Church in Glascote.

== Culture ==
=== Scientific ===
Sir Ernest William Titterton was brought up in Tamworth. He was a research officer for the British Admiralty during World War II before becoming in 1943 a member of the British mission to the U.S. to participate in the Manhattan Project which developed the atomic bomb. He was knighted in 1970.

=== Music ===
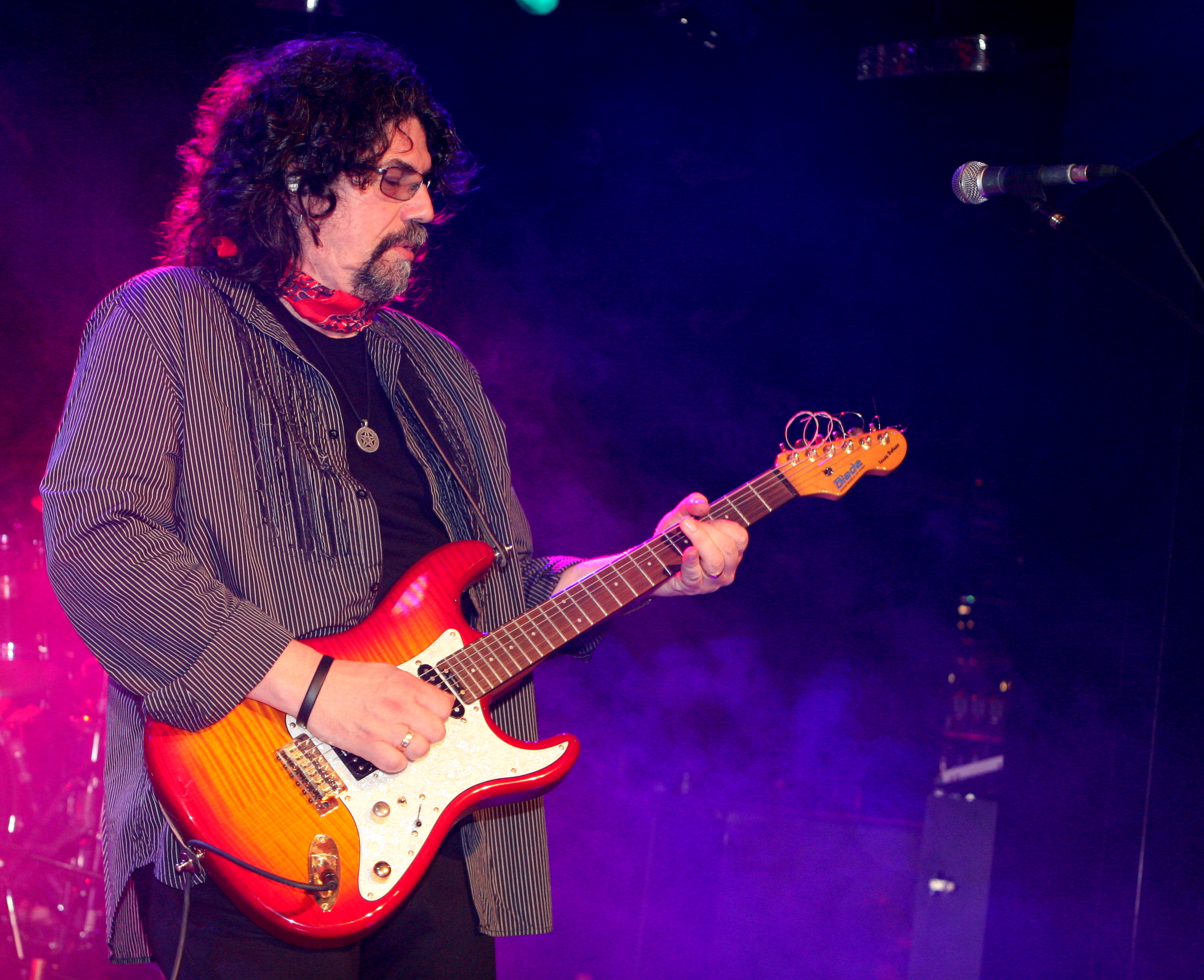
Phil Bates & Electric Light Orchestra

Former The Teardrop Explodes frontman and solo artist/writer Julian Cope grew up in Tamworth and later lived in nearby Drayton Bassett. Cope recorded three solo albums during his Tamworth years, World Shut Your Mouth (1984), Fried (1984) and Saint Julian (1987), and all three used various locations around Tamworth for their sleeve art and several videos.

The heavy rock band Wolfsbane cut their teeth in the town, before their lead singer Blaze Bayley went on to front Iron Maiden.

Rock guitarist Clem Clempson was born in Tamworth. Bob Catley, the lead singer of rock band Magnum also lives in Tamworth.

Guitarist/vocalist/songwriter/ producer Phil Bates (Trickster, ELO Pt2, Quill and solo artist) was born in Tamworth, and played in local bands the Teenbeats and Source of Power until moving away from the area in 1971. Phil still has strong family and musical connections with Tamworth.

Amington Band are a traditional British brass band based in their own band room. They have been based in the village of Amington since the 1917.

== Transport ==
=== Road ===
The main road running through Tamworth is the A5 bypass. The M42 motorway runs to the east of Tamworth and the town is served by junction 10 which also contains Tamworth services.

The Egg is a magic roundabout in the town centre. It forms the junction of the A51, A453 and A513 and terminates the B5000. It consists of the roads Ankerdrive and Bolebridge Street, and is listed as being part of the A51. The Egg has a cinema complex and restaurant in the centre, with the River Anker running through it. The Snowdome and Tamworth FC also directly adjoin the junction. It was voted the fourth worst roundabout in Britain in 2005.

=== Railways ===
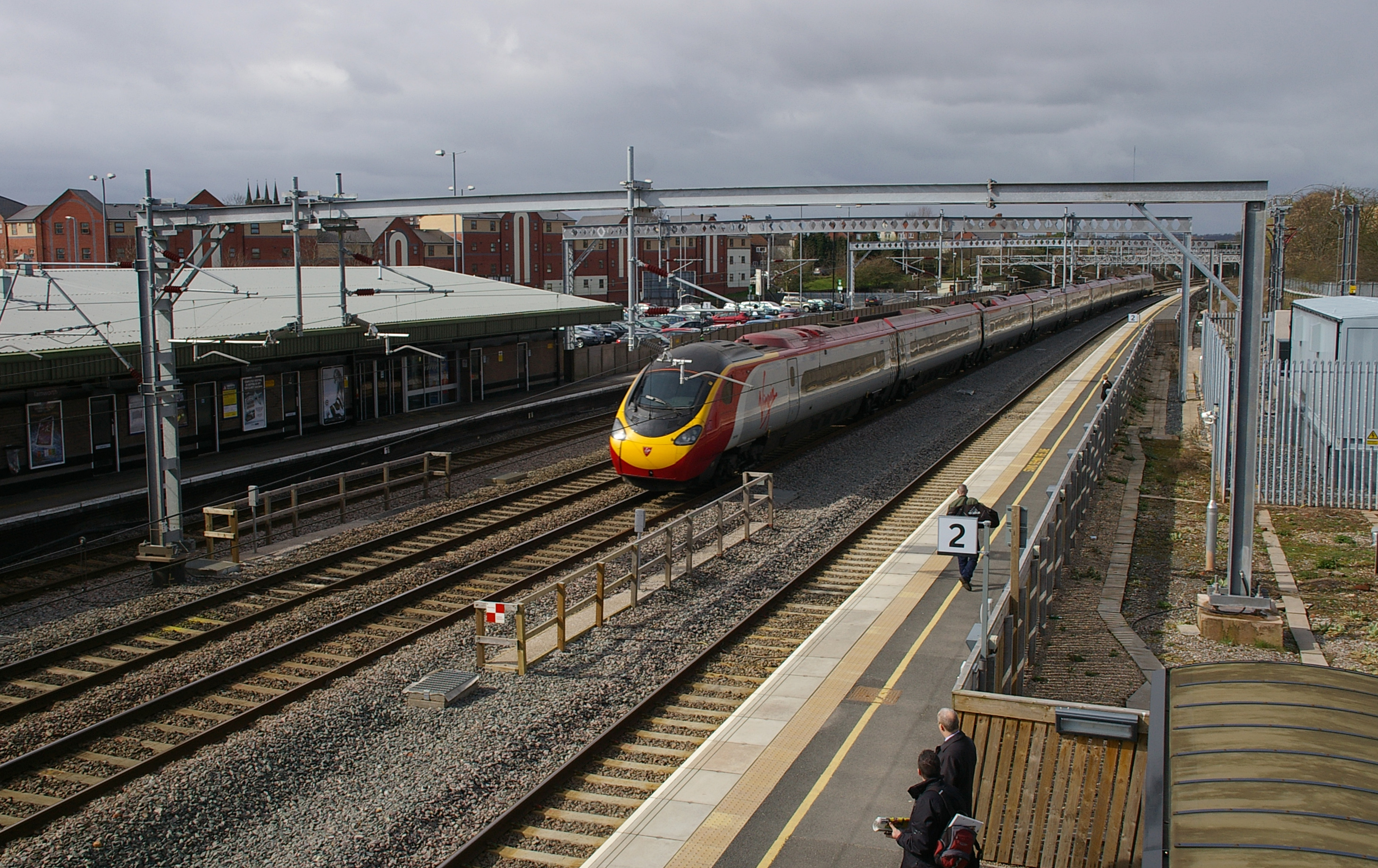
Tamworth station

Tamworth railway station is located on Victoria Road and consists of four platforms. It is both a high- and low-level station, serving as an interchange between the West Coast Main Line and the Cross Country Route.

Wilnecote railway station, on the Cross Country Route, serves the suburbs of Wilnecote and Two Gates.

=== Airport ===
The nearest airports to Tamworth are Birmingham and East Midlands.

=== Buses ===
Bus services around the town are operated by Arriva Midlands North, Diamond Bus and Stagecoach Midlands. Arriva and Stagecoach operates services to Atherstone and Nuneaton. Arriva also operates services 765 and X65 to Lichfield and service 110 to Birmingham via Fazeley, Sutton Coldfield and Erdington. There is also a half hourly service to Kingsbury on Diamond routes 76 and 76A, which extend occasionally to Coleshill and Sutton Coldfield.

Diamond also operate a college service to Rodbaston College and West Midlands Bus operate two school services from Wilnecote to St Francis of Assisi in Aldridge.

There are also bus services connecting the town with its suburbs and to the newly built Mercia Park near Ashby-de-la-Zouch in Leicestershire. Following acquisition of the company, Midland Classic services now operate under the Diamond East Midlands brand.

=== Canal ===
The Coventry Canal runs through Tamworth. At Fazeley Junction, just outside the town, it joins the Birmingham and Fazeley Canal. At Fradley Junction, a few miles north-west, the Coventry Canal joins the Trent and Mersey Canal.

== Twin towns ==
Tamworth's town twins are:

- Bad Laasphe, Germany (since 1980)
- Tamworth, New South Wales, Australia
- Vaujours, France

== Blue plaques ==
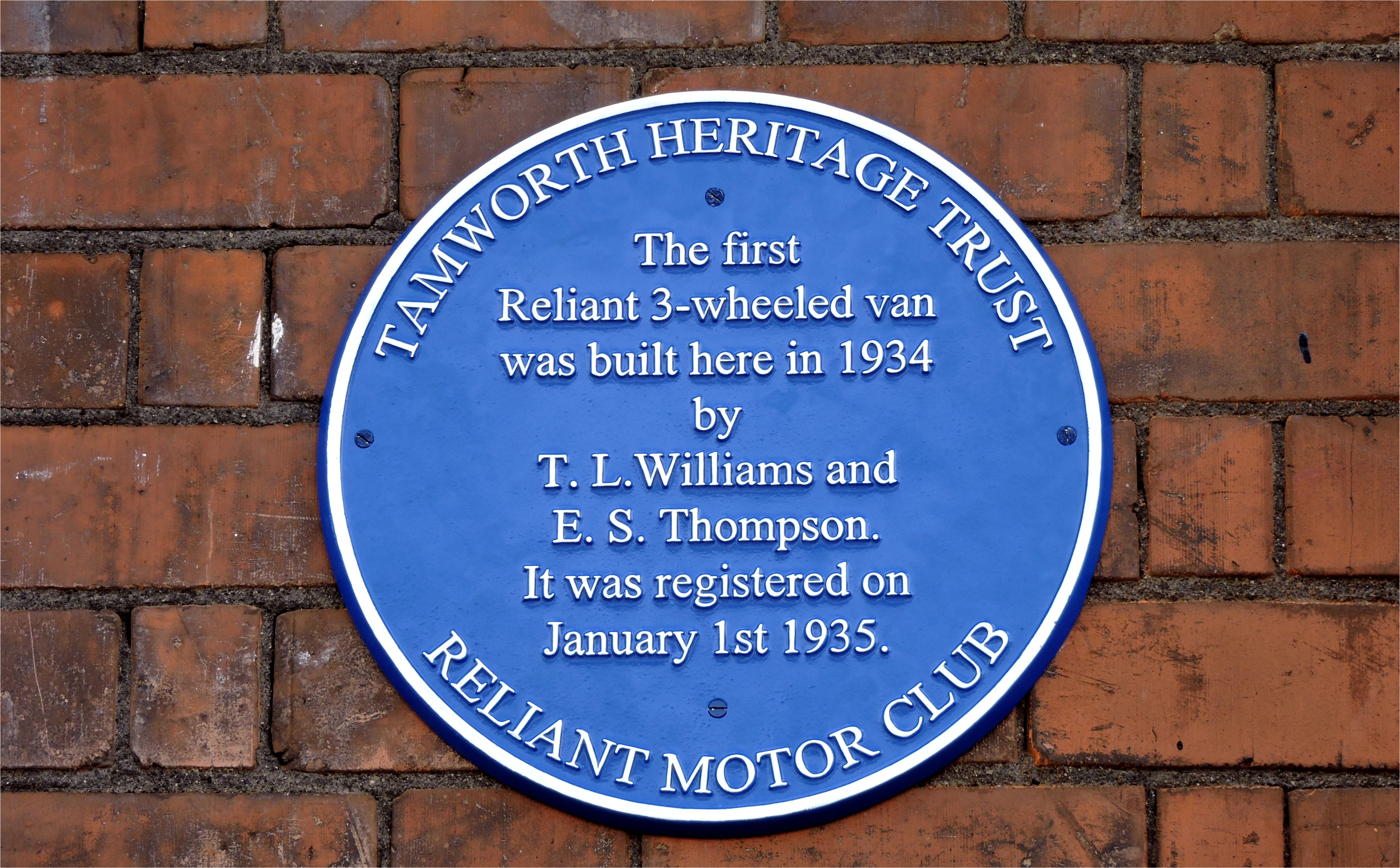
Reliant Blue Plaque

Tamworth currently has two historical blue plaques. The first is positioned on the old Bank House on Lady Bank by the Tamworth Civic Society and commemorates the Tamworth Savings Bank that was founded in 1823. More recently on 8 July 2017, a blue plaque was unveiled by Tamworth Heritage Trust and the Reliant Motor Club at Bro-Dawel on the Kettlebrook Road to honour Reliant's founders, Mr T. L. Williams and Mr E. S. Thompson, and marks the birthplace of the first Reliant prototype built in 1934.

== Sport ==
=== Football ===
Tamworth F.C. is a football club based at The Lamb Ground. The club has a keen rivalry with fellow Staffordshire clubs Stafford Rangers and Burton Albion. However, their biggest rivals are Nuneaton Town. Tamworth currently compete in the National League following two successive promotions in 2023 and 2024.

In 2025 Tamworth F.C. drew major international attention when they were drawn to play Premier League giants Tottenham Hotspur at The Lamb Ground in the FA Cup. Tamworth initially defied the odds to hold Tottenham to a 0–0 draw after 90 minutes, which in any other season would have been enough to guarantee them a lucrative replay back at Tottenham. However, due to a rule change that had come into force that season which scrapped replays from the FA Cup, the two sides had to go to extra time where Tottenham eventually ran out 3–0 winners.

Tamworth F.C. has fielded a number of notable players in recent times, including former West Brom striker Bob Taylor and, for one match in the 2005–06 season, former Aston Villa and Arsenal midfielder Paul Merson. Other football players from Tamworth include former Manchester City goalkeeper Tony Coton; former goalkeeper Martin Taylor who played for Derby County and Wycombe Wanderers; former Everton and Wales international Ashley Williams; and former Leicester City footballer Marc Albrighton is also from Tamworth.

=== Rugby ===
Tamworth RUFC is a rugby club based at Wigginton Park.

=== Field hockey ===
Tamworth Hockey Club is a field hockey club based at Hints Lane, Hopwas and competes in the Midlands Hockey League.

=== Cricket ===
Tamworth Cricket Club is also based at Hints Lane, Hopwas.

=== Bowls ===
Tamworth Castle Bowling Club was founded in 1814. This crown green bowling club is situated behind a green door on Ladybank in the shadow of Tamworth Castle. The club is owned by its membership with a season running from March to October.

Tamworth and District Indoor Bowling Club officially founded and opened in 1990. A fire destroyed the club just after it was originally built delaying its opening by about 12 months. This is the only indoor bowling club in Staffordshire and with over 350 members it is actively involved at club, county and national levels of competition. There is an active junior section with county representatives to under 25 age group. Bowling for people with disabilities is an important part of the club as is coaching for all players. Owned by its membership the club has an outdoor green operating April to September whilst the indoor rinks are open throughout the year.

=== Speedway ===
Speedway racing took place in the Tamworth area in the 1930s and in the post war era featured at the Greyhound Stadium in Mile Oak. The Hounds started out in 1947 racing in the National League Division Three before becoming The Tammies in 1950 when the venture was purchased by Birmingham promoter Les Marshall.

=== Sports teams in Tamworth ===
Club	Sport	Founded	League	Venue	Logo
Tamworth	Rugby	1925	Midlands 2 West (North) Midlands	Wigginton Park
Tamworth	Football	1933	National League	The Lamb Ground
Bolehall Swifts	Football	1953	Midland Football League Division One	Rene Road Ground
Mile Oak Rovers	Football	1958	Folded 2010	Recreation Ground
Coton Green	Football	1982	Midland Football League Division Two	New Mill Lane
Dosthill Colts	Football	1990	Folded 2011	Rene Road Ground
Tamworth Tigers	Basketball	2020	Youth Basketball Leagues	Rawlett Leisure Centre

== Education ==
There are five secondary schools in Tamworth, a sixth form centre and a branch of South Staffordshire College along with 27 primary schools.

== Media ==
In 1868 The Tamworth Herald was launched by Daniel Addison, with its original premises in Silver Street. Mr Addison continued to publish the paper for nine years until 29 October 1877, when it was taken over by a consortium of leading townsmen. In modern day, the newspaper is owned by Reach Regionals Ltd, a part of Reach PLC. Its reporters also contribute local news stories to the Birmingham Mail's website, Birmingham Live in addition to their print based activities.

In recent years the print version of Tamworth Herald has dwindled. The 2020 circulation figures from the Audit Bureau of Circulation show that for that year their circulation was just 4,723 a week. The Tamworth Herald was crowned ‘Newspaper of the Year’ at the Midland Media Awards in both 2016 and 2017.

JAMedia produces a lot of Tamworth News and Heritage videos. In 2018, JAMedia had the distinction of broadcasting the first full Council meetings, (these are now live-streamed by the Council) and live-streaming the Tamworth election counts and results.

Local radio stations are BBC Radio WM on 95.3 FM, Capital Mid-Counties on 101.6 FM, Greatest Hits Radio Birmingham & The West Midlands on 105.2 FM, Hits Radio Birmingham on 96.4 FM and a community radio station, Radio Tamworth, which broadcasts on 106.8 FM.

Tamworth lies in the BBC West Midlands and ITV Central television regions. Television signals are received from the Sutton Coldfield transmitter.

== Notable people ==
=== Politics ===
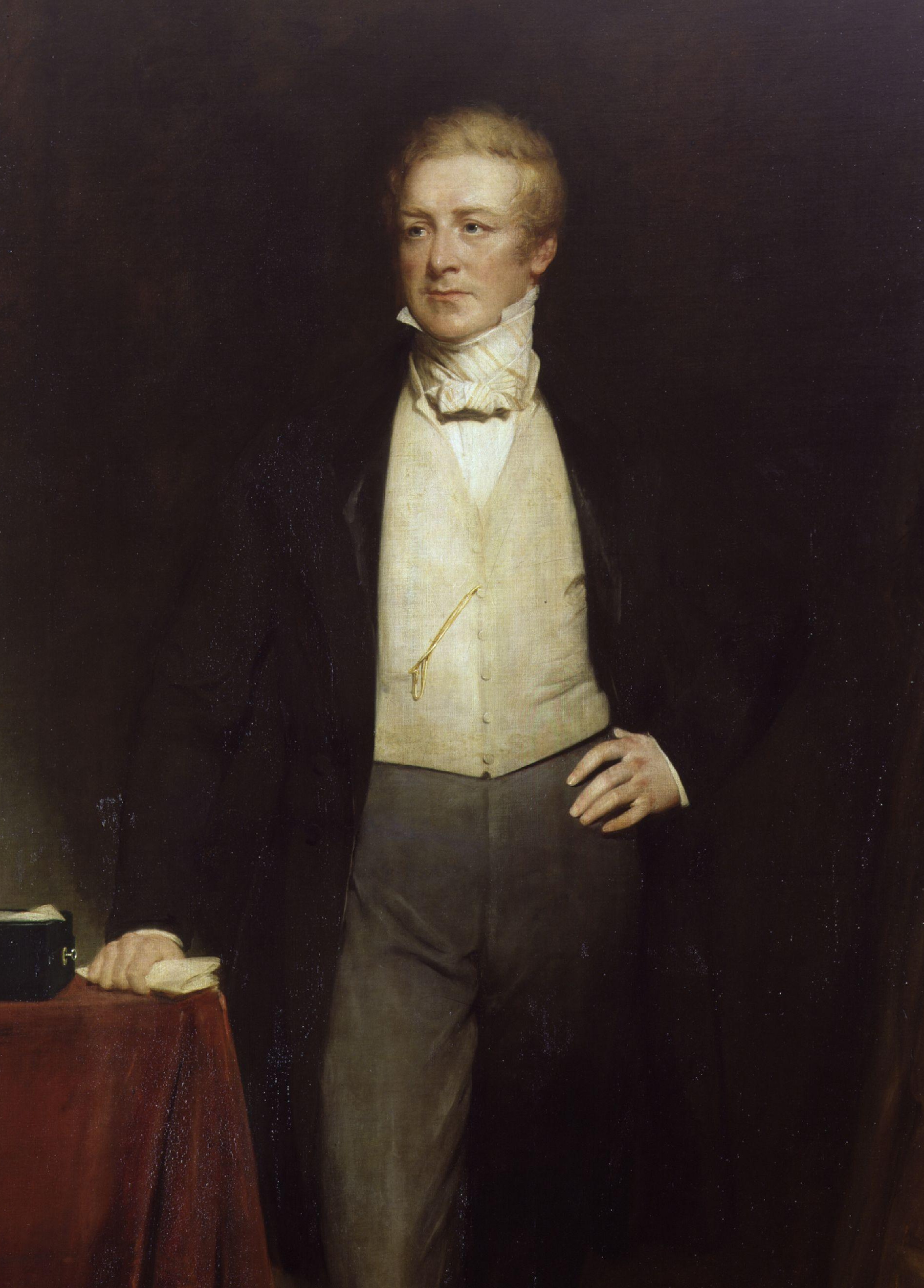
Sir Robert Peel

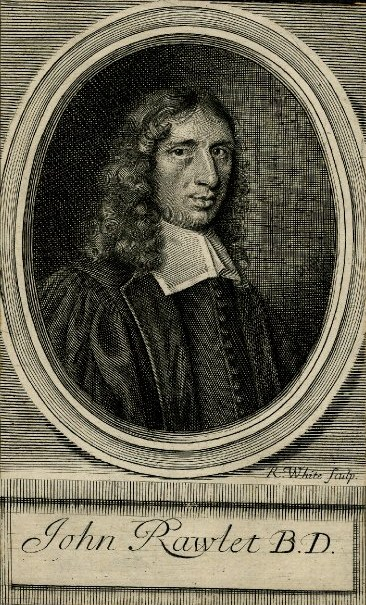
John Rawlet, 1687

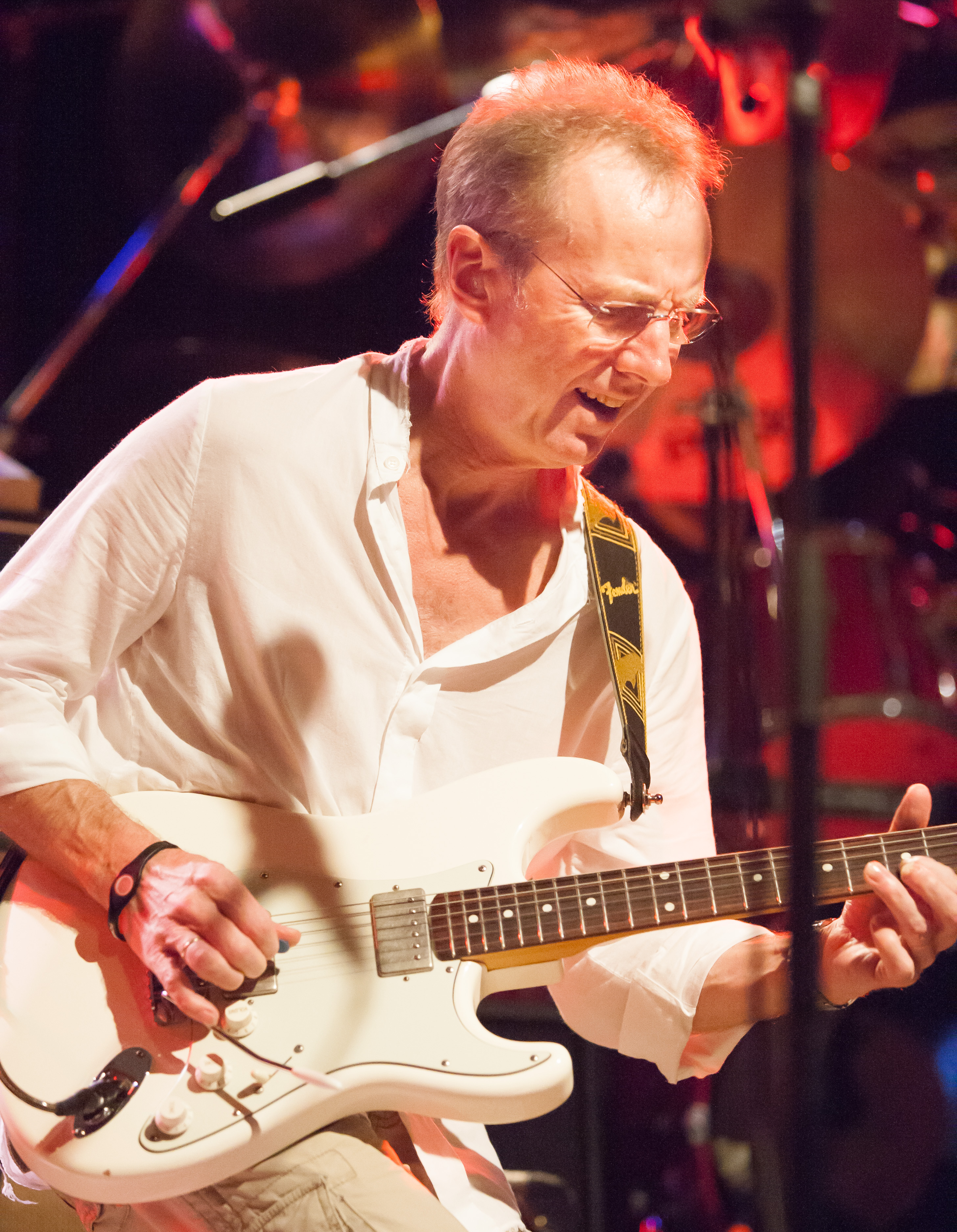
Clem Clempson, 2010

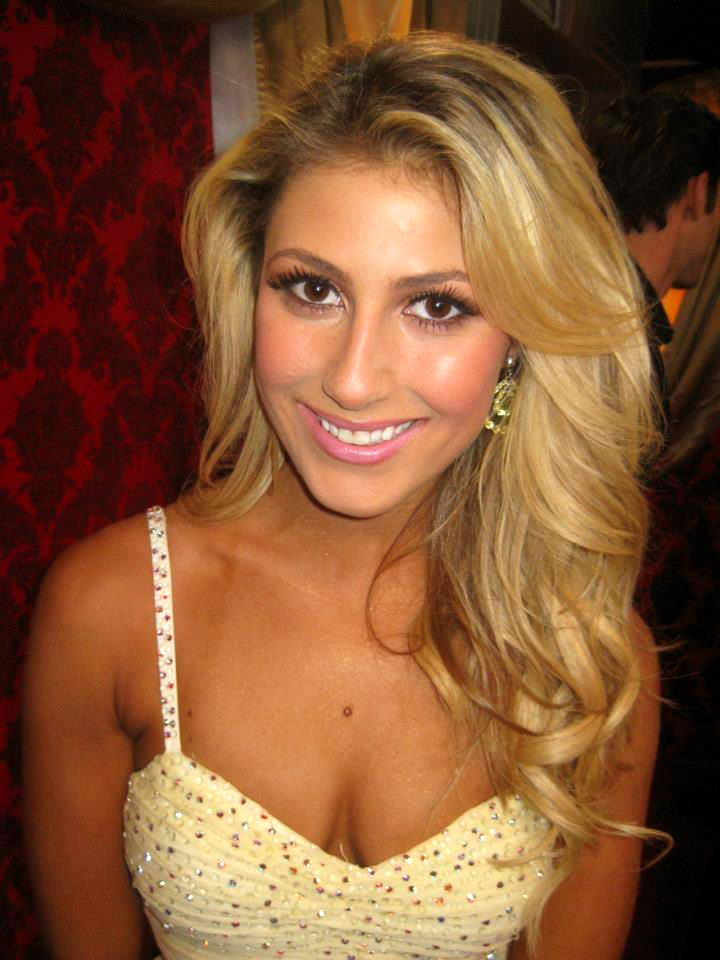
Emma Slater, 2013

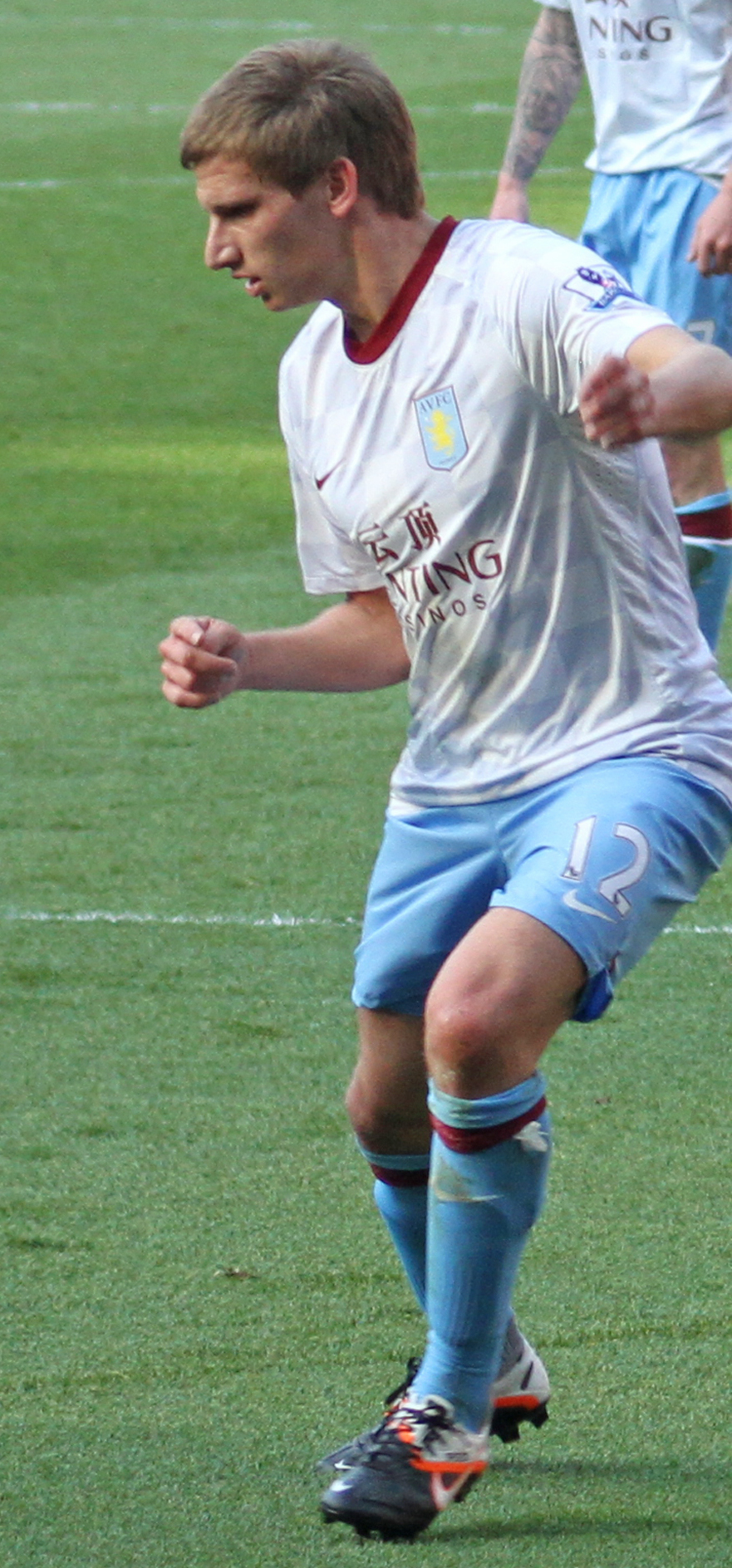
Marc Albrighton, 2012

- Anthony Dyott (c.1560–1622) lawyer, politician, Recorder of Tamworth, MP for Lichfield from 1601 to 1621
- John Swinfen (1613–1694) politician and MP variously between 1645 and 1691, elected for Tamworth in 1659, 1661 and 1681
- Thomas Guy (1644–1724) founded almshouses in Tamworth in 1678, which were rebuilt in 1913. He also commissioned Tamworth Town Hall in 1701 and founded Guy's Hospital in London in 1721.
- Sir Robert Peel (1788–1850), a British statesman, served twice as Prime Minister (1834–1835 and 1841–1846), the father of modern British policing. MP for Tamworth from 1830 to 1850
- Henry John Roby (1830–1915) classical scholar, writer on Roman law, Liberal MP for Eccles 1890/1895 and a Cambridge Apostle
- Brian Jenkins (born 1942) Labour Party politician, MP for Tamworth from 1997 to 2010
- Phil Bennion (born 1954) farmer, LibDem MEP for the West Midlands from 2012 to 2014

=== Public service and commerce ===
- Baron Marmion held by Roger Marmion (died ca. 1129), and centred on Tamworth Castle
- Thomas Blake (c.1597–1657) Puritan clergyman, controversialist of moderate Presbyterian sympathies.
- John Rawlet (1642–1686) Anglican cleric, preacher and writer of religious literature
- Thomas Sheasby (senior) (ca.1740–1799) civil engineer and contractor, built bridges and canals
- Samuel Parkes (1815–1864), won the Victoria Cross in the Charge of the Light Brigade, was born in Wigginton and baptised locally.
- Gage Earle Freeman (1820–1903), clergyman and writer on falconry.
- William Gordon Bagnall (1852–1907) mechanical engineer, founded W.G. Bagnall in 1875
- Joseph Adcock (1864–1914) Anglican clergyman and first-class cricketer in New Zealand
- Frederick William Thomas (1867–1956) an English Indologist and Tibetologist
- Maud Doria Haviland (1889–1941), ornithologist, entomologist, explorer, lecturer, photographer and writer.
- Ernest Titterton (1916–1990) was a British nuclear physicist.
- Colin Grazier (1920–1942), able seaman; posthumously awarded the George Cross for capturing Enigma codebooks
- Alan Edwin Thomas Harper (born 1944), Archbishop of Armagh and Primate of All Ireland from 2007 to 2012

=== Arts ===
- Appleby Matthews (1884–1948) organist and the first conductor of the City of Birmingham Symphony Orchestra
- Bryan Pringle (1935–2002) actor, appeared in television, film and theatre productions
- James Lees (1939–2015), English ceremonial magician
- Clem Clempson (born 1949) rock guitarist, played for Colosseum and Humble Pie
- Sue Coe (born 1951) artist, illustrator and printmaker, lives in Upstate New York
- Phil Bates (born 1953) English musician, member of Trickster and Quill
- Julian Cope (born 1957) musician, author, antiquarian, poet and cultural commentator, grew up locally
- Sally Matthews (born 1964), sculptor, particularly of animals.
- Jemma Palmer (born 1986) an English model and wrestler, signed up to WWE.
- Luke Pearson (born 1987) cartoonist, illustrator, and creator of both the Hilda graphic novel and Netflix Animated Series.
- Emma Slater (born 1988) professional dancer/choreographer on Dancing with Stars
- Erin Kellyman (born 1998) actress, known for Solo: A Star Wars Story and The Falcon and the Winter Soldier

=== Sport ===
- Francis Marlow (1867–1952) cricketer who played 219 first-class matches between 1891-1904.
- Hubert Pearson (1886–1955) goalkeeper, 341 appearances for West Bromwich Albion F.C.
- Alec Mercer (1891–1977), footballer who played 130 games
- Harold Pearson (1908–1994) goalkeeper, over 300 pro appearances mainly for West Bromwich Albion F.C.
- Albert Mullard (1920–1984) prisoner of war and footballer, played almost 300 pro games mainly for Port Vale F.C.
- Micky Steele-Bodger (1925-2019) former rugby union footballer, played for Harlequins and the Barbarians
- Dave Black (born 1952) long-distance runner, competed in the 1980 Summer Olympics
- Roger Brown (1952–2011) football manager and player, played over 300 games mainly for Fulham F.C.
- Peter Eastoe (born 1953) former footballer, 350 pro appearances mainly for Everton F.C.
- Steve Fox (1958–2012) footballer, made 278 pro appearances mainly for Wrexham F.C.
- Tony Coton (born 1961) former football goalkeeper, 501 club caps mainly for Watford F.C.
- Martin Taylor (born 1966), footballer who played 370 games, mainly for Wycombe Wanderers F.C.
- Dean Williams (born 1972), football goalkeeper, played 403 games
- David Gilbert (born 1981), professional snooker player
- Dan Martin (born 1986) Irish professional racing cyclist, grew up locally
- Martin Plowman (born 1987), racing driver,
- Marc Albrighton (born 1989) English professional footballer, plays for Leicester City F.C., played 343 games
- Joe Newell (born 1993) footballer with Hibernian FC; has played over 380 games

=== Other ===
- Thomas "Bomber" Kavanagh (born 1968), Irish criminal and a senior member of the crime organisation founded by Christy Kinahan ran his criminal empire from Tamworth.

== Freedom of the Borough ==
The following people and military units have received the Freedom of the Borough of Tamworth.

=== Individuals ===
- Frederick George Allton: 1951.
- Marc Kevin Albrighton: 17 May 2022.
- Terence (Terry) Alec Dix: 30 July 2009. Local councillor from 1967 to 1982 and county councillor From 1981 to 2009.

=== Military Units ===
- Royal British Legion: 2014.
- Royal Naval Association: 2014.
- Mercian Regimental Association: 2014.
- Royal Air Force Association: 2014.
- Tamworth and Wilnecote Unit St. John Ambulance: 25 September 2015.
- The Mercian Regiment.
- The Defence Medical Services.
- RFA Fort Rosalie, Royal Fleet Auxiliary.

== See also ==
- Listed buildings in Tamworth, Staffordshire
