= Edward Holmes (architect) =

British architect

- Born: 1832
- Died: 1909 (aged 76–77)
- Occupation: Architect
- Buildings: St Mary's Church, Selly Oak

Edward Holmes (1832–1909) was a British architect from Birmingham, England.

== Family ==
He was the son of Edward Holmes and Elisa Henrietta Roulet, christened on 7 September 1832 in St Mary's Church, Moseley. He was educated at Birmingham Free Grammar School.

He married Mary Ann Briggs on 7 October 1856 at St Mary's Church, Moseley. Mary Ann was the daughter of Samuel and Elizabeth Briggs. There were three children: Elizabeth Henriette Holmes (1857 - 1944), Edward Briggs Holmes (1858 - 1920) and Gertrude Fanny Holmes (1861–1938).

There is a brass plaque in St Mary's Church, Selly Oak to the memory of Mary Ann Holmes aged 31 years, wife of Edward Holmes (Architect of this Church) who died 5 November 1861 and is buried in the Family Vault at St Mary's Church, Moseley.

Holmes married Mary Lavinia Hemming on 27 May 1863 in Alvechurch. They had a further 11 children.

He was for many years architect to the King's Norton School Board, and to King's Norton District Council. For this and for the Aston and Handsworth Boards he designed a number of school buildings.

He contracted pneumonia just before Christmas 1909 and died at Wyndcliffe, School Road, Moseley on 30 December 1909 and his funeral was held in Moseley parish church on 3 January 1910. Mary Lavinia died in 1921.

== Buildings designed ==
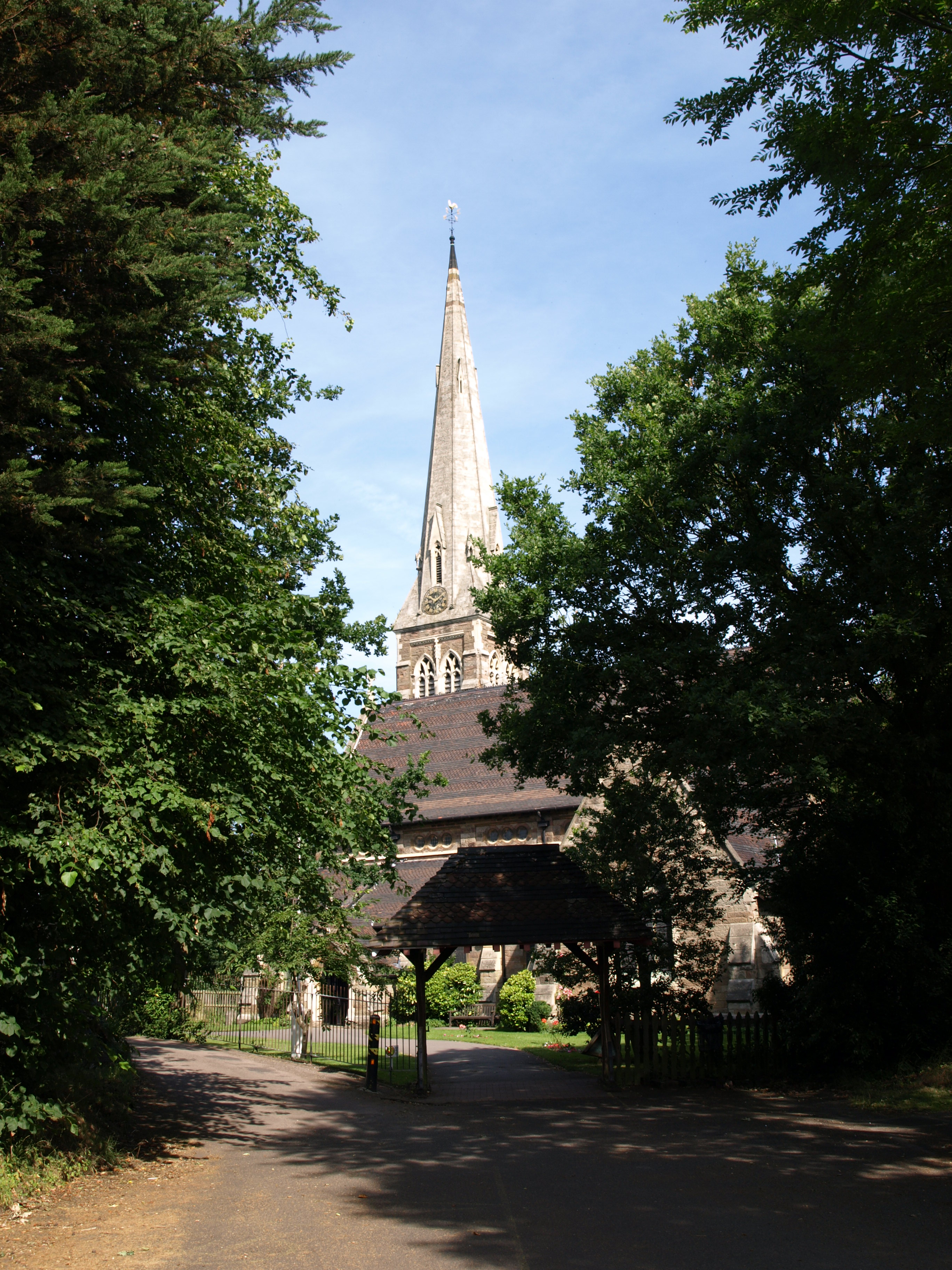
St Mary's Church, Selly Oak

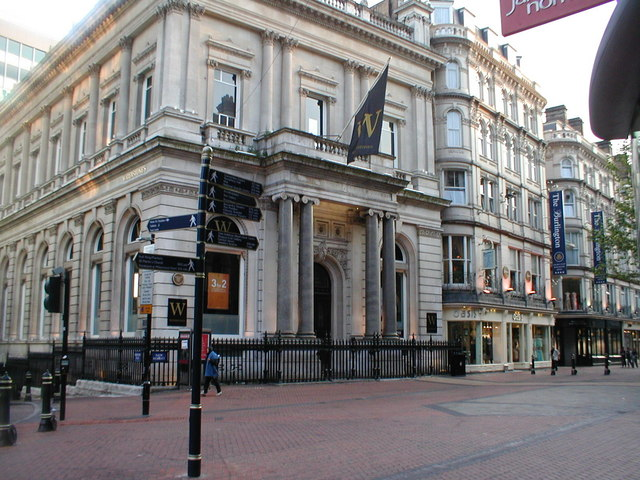
Former Midland Bank, New Street

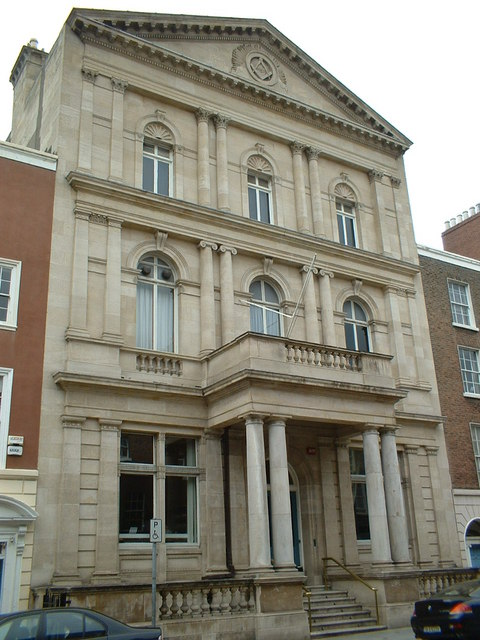
Grand Lodge of Ireland, Molesworth Street, Dublin 1867-68

- Corn Exchange, High Street, Alcester 1857-58 (demolished)
- West Bromwich Cemetery Chapels 1858
- Lodge and twin mortuary chapels, Belper Cemetery. 1858
- Foleshill New Workhouse, Coventry 1858
- Corporation Baths, Woodcock Street, Birmingham 1859-60
- All Saints' Church, King's Heath with Frederick Preedy, 1860
- St Mary's Church, Selly Oak. 1861
- Moseley Independent Congregational chapel. 1862
- St James' Church, Shirley. New roof. 1862.
- National Schools, Oldbury 1864
- The Royal Sutton Hotel, Sutton Coldfield railway station 1864-65
- Exchange Building, 1865. Enlarged 1877. Demolished 1965.
- Immanuel Church, Broad Street, Birmingham. 1865
- Former Masonic Hall, Ethel Street, Birmingham, 1865-69
- Masonic Hall, Molesworth Street, Dublin 1867-68
- Lady Chapel addition to St Paul's Church, Moseley Road, Balsall Heath. 1865.
- St John The Divine, Horninglow, Burton upon Trent. 1866
- St Mark's, Winshill, Burton-on-Trent, 1869
- Midland Bank, New Street, Birmingham. 1867-69 (now Apple retail store)
- 37 Bennetts Hill, Birmingham. 1868-1870
- Kings Norton Workhouse. 1870
- Penkridge Union Workhouse, Cannock 1870
- Wesleyan Chapel, Station Street, Burton on Trent 1870-71
- St Paul's Church, Dosthill. 1872
- George Wilkinson and Co, Ashted Steam Brewery, Ashted Row, Birmingham. 1874
- St Peter's Church, Drayton Bassett 1875 (restoration)
- Board School, Attleboro Lane, Water Orton 1878
- Board School, Vicarage Street/Sycamore Road, Aston 1878
- St Alphege Church, Solihull 1879 (restorations)
- Former Medical Mission, River Street, Birmingham, 1880
- Chadwick Manor, Balsall, Solihull
- Alcester Brewery 1887
- Board Schools, Rookery Road, Handsworth 1899
