= Borough Park, Tamworth =

Small residential area of Tamworth, Staffordshire, England

Coordinates: 52.6473°N 1.6890°W

Borough Park is a small residential area of Tamworth, Staffordshire, 1 mile north of the town centre, and close to the River Anker. The area is served by two local shops, including Borough Park former Post office. Bordering Borough Park is the small area of Mildenhall.
