= Tamworth Borough Council elections =

Class of election in the United Kingdom

Tamworth Borough Council elections are held three years out of every four, with a third of the council elected each time. Tamworth Borough Council is the local authority for the non-metropolitan district of Tamworth in Staffordshire, England. Since the last boundary changes in 2002, 30 councillors have been elected from 10 wards.

== Council elections ==
- 1973 Tamworth Borough Council election
- 1976 Tamworth Borough Council election (New ward boundaries)
- 1978 Tamworth Borough Council election
- 1979 Tamworth Borough Council election
- 1980 Tamworth Borough Council election
- 1982 Tamworth Borough Council election
- 1983 Tamworth Borough Council election
- 1984 Tamworth Borough Council election
- 1986 Tamworth Borough Council election
- 1987 Tamworth Borough Council election (New ward boundaries)
- 1988 Tamworth Borough Council election
- 1990 Tamworth Borough Council election
- 1991 Tamworth Borough Council election
- 1992 Tamworth Borough Council election
- 1994 Tamworth Borough Council election
- 1995 Tamworth Borough Council election
- 1996 Tamworth Borough Council election
- 1998 Tamworth Borough Council election
- 1999 Tamworth Borough Council election
- 2000 Tamworth Borough Council election
- 2002 Tamworth Borough Council election (New ward boundaries)
- 2003 Tamworth Borough Council election
- 2004 Tamworth Borough Council election
- 2006 Tamworth Borough Council election
- 2007 Tamworth Borough Council election
- 2008 Tamworth Borough Council election
- 2010 Tamworth Borough Council election
- 2011 Tamworth Borough Council election
- 2012 Tamworth Borough Council election
- 2014 Tamworth Borough Council election
- 2015 Tamworth Borough Council election (article is a stub)
- 2016 Tamworth Borough Council election (article is a stub)
- 2018 Tamworth Borough Council election
- 2019 Tamworth Borough Council election
- 2021 Tamworth Borough Council election
- 2022 Tamworth Borough Council election
- 2023 Tamworth Borough Council election
- 2024 Tamworth Borough Council election
- 2026 Tamworth Borough Council election

== Borough result maps ==
2002 results map

2003 results map

2004 results map

2006 results map

2007 results map

2008 results map

2010 results map

2011 results map

2012 results map

2014 results map

2015 results map

2016 results map

2018 results map

2019 results map

2021 results map

2022 results map

2023 results map

2024 results map

2026 results map

== By-election results ==
=== 1994-1998 ===
Castle By-Election 20 March 1997
Party	Candidate	Votes	%	±%
Labour		1,045	76.0	
Conservative		220	16.0	
Liberal Democrats		86	6.3	
Independent		24	1.8	
Majority		825	60.0	
Turnout		1,375		
Labour hold		Swing		

=== 1997-2001 ===
Bolehall By-Election 30 October 1997
Party	Candidate	Votes	%	±%
Labour		515	71.2	−10.1
Conservative		116	16.0	+3.1
Socialist Labour		52	7.2	+7.2
Liberal Democrats		40	5.5	+5.5
Majority		399	55.2	
Turnout		723	13.2	
Labour hold		Swing		

Castle By-Election 30 October 1997
Party	Candidate	Votes	%	±%
Labour		551	71.9	−5.1
Conservative		99	12.6	+1.9
Socialist Labour		58	7.6	+7.6
Liberal Democrats		58	7.6	−4.7
Majority		452	59.3	
Turnout		766	13.6	
Labour hold		Swing		

Trinity By-Election 30 October 1997
Party	Candidate	Votes	%	±%
Labour		532	63.2	+0.4
Conservative		260	30.9	+2.4
Liberal Democrats		50	5.9	−2.8
Majority		272	32.3	
Turnout		842	16.5	
Labour hold		Swing		

=== 1998-2002 ===
Spital By-Election 10 December 1998
Party	Candidate	Votes	%	±%
Conservative		610	55.6	+13.5
Labour		405	36.9	−12.4
Liberal Democrats		82	7.5	−1.1
Majority		205	18.7	
Turnout		1,097	19.5	
Conservative gain from Labour		Swing		

Stoneydelph By-Election 10 December 1998
Party	Candidate	Votes	%	±%
Labour		240	73.9	+36.0
Conservative		67	20.6	+13.5
Liberal Democrats		18	5.5	+3.8
Majority		173	53.3	
Turnout		325	6.9	
Labour gain from Independent		Swing		

Amington By-Election 14 December 2000
Party	Candidate	Votes	%	±%
Labour	Michael Smith	415	46.3	+8.3
Conservative	Diane Wells	359	40.1	−21.9
Independent		82	9.2	+9.2
Liberal Democrats	Jennifer Pinkett	40	4.5	+4.5
Majority		56	6.2	
Turnout		896	13.6	
Labour hold		Swing		

=== 2002-2006 ===
Trinity By-Election 17 July 2003
Party	Candidate	Votes	%	±%
Conservative	Mick Oates	478	49.2	+0.2
Labour	Pat Dix	351	36.2	+0.0
Liberal Democrats		141	14.5	−0.3
Majority		127	13.0	
Turnout		970	16.8	
Conservative hold		Swing		

=== 2006-2010 ===
Castle By-Election 8 November 2007
Party	Candidate	Votes	%	±%
Labour	Marion Couchman	619	40.3	+2.1
Conservative	Ian Stuart	613	39.9	−7.7
BNP	Lynne Smith	208	13.6	+13.6
Liberal Democrats	Jenny Pinkett	95	6.2	−8.0
Majority		6	0.4	
Turnout		1,535	27.4	
Labour gain from Conservative		Swing		

=== 2010-2014 ===
Wilnecote By-Election 2 May 2013
Party	Candidate	Votes	%	±%
Labour	Joan Jenkins	890	48.1	−9.6
Conservative	Alex Farrell	873	47.2	+4.9
Liberal Democrats	Roger Jones	87	4.7	+4.7
Majority		17	0.9	
Turnout		1,850		
Labour gain from Conservative		Swing		

=== 2014-2018 ===
Bolehall By-Election 12 October 2017
Party	Candidate	Votes	%	±%
Labour	Sheree Peaple	643	53.4	+3.9
Conservative	Thomas Jay	561	46.6	+22.2
Majority		82	6.8	
Turnout		1,204		
Labour hold		Swing		

=== 2018-2022 ===
Mercian By-Election 12 December 2019
Party	Candidate	Votes	%	±%
Conservative	Steven Pritchard	2,181	65.0	+22.4
Labour	Gordon Moore	1,173	35.0	+0.4
Majority		1,008	30.0	
Turnout		3,354		
Conservative hold		Swing		

Spital By-Election 3 February 2022
Party	Candidate	Votes	%	±%
Conservative	Christian Cooke	613	43.6	−11.7
Independent	Huw Loxton	482	34.3	+16.9
Labour	Dave Foster	311	22.1	−3.0
Majority		131	9.3	
Turnout		1,406		
Conservative hold		Swing		

=== 2022-2026 ===
Belgrave By-Election 2 March 2023
Party	Candidate	Votes	%	±%
Conservative	Paul Thompson	334	34.3	−8.1
Labour	Craig Adams	314	32.2	−3.6
Independent	Charlie Taylor	251	25.8	+25.8
Reform	Ian Cooper	40	4.1	+4.1
Green	Adam Bayliss	35	3.6	−2.5
Majority		20	2.1	
Turnout		974		
Conservative hold		Swing		

Amington By-Election 5 October 2023
Party	Candidate	Votes	%	±%
Labour	Lewis Smith	669	42.9	−7.8
Conservative	Donna Summers	526	33.7	−15.6
Independent	Michelle Cook	242	15.5	+15.5
Reform	Ian Cooper	98	6.3	+6.3
UKIP	Robert Bilcliff	25	1.6	+1.6
Majority		143	9.2	
Turnout		1,560		
Labour hold		Swing		

Spital By-Election 5 March 2026
Party	Candidate	Votes	%	±%
Reform	Wayne Luca	719	43.6	
Green	Stephen Andrews	337	20.4	
Conservative	Brett Beetham	319	19.4	
Labour	Steve Holland	273	16.6	
Majority		382	23.2	
Turnout		1,648		
Reform gain from Labour		Swing		
