= 2019 Tamworth Borough Council election =

2019 UK local government election

Results of the 2019 Tamworth Borough Council election

The 2019 Tamworth Borough Council election took place on 2 May 2019 to elect members of Tamworth Borough Council in England. This was on the same day as other local elections.

== Ward results ==
=== Amington ===
Amington
| Party | Candidate | Votes | % | ±% |
|---|---|---|---|---|
| Conservative | Michelle Cook | 838 | 47.7 | |
| Labour | Janice Wardup | 453 | 25.8 | |
| UKIP | Paul Millington | 352 | 20.0 | |
| Green | Andrew Tilley | 113 | 6.4 | |
| Majority | | 385 | 21.9 | |
| Turnout | | 1,765 | 30.0 | |
| Conservative hold | | Swing | | |

=== Belgrave ===
Belgrave
| Party | Candidate | Votes | % | ±% |
|---|---|---|---|---|
| Conservative | Simon Goodall | 610 | 39.3 | |
| Labour | Margarey Clarke | 419 | 27.0 | |
| UKIP | Paul Smith | 290 | 18.7 | |
| Independent | Kenneth Forest | 136 | 8.8 | |
| Green | Lesley Edmunds | 97 | 6.3 | |
| Majority | | 191 | | |
| Turnout | | 1,558 | 27.0 | |
| Conservative hold | | Swing | | |

=== Bolehall ===
Bolehall
| Party | Candidate | Votes | % | ±% |
|---|---|---|---|---|
| Labour Co-op | Sheree Peaple | 677 | 44.6 | |
| Conservative | Richard Carling | 471 | 31.0 | |
| UKIP | John Clarke | 371 | 24.4 | |
| Majority | | | | |
| Turnout | | 1,547 | 27.0 | |
| Labour Co-op hold | | Swing | | |

=== Castle ===
Castle
| Party | Candidate | Votes | % | ±% |
|---|---|---|---|---|
| Conservative | Alexander Farrell | 768 | 43.4 | |
| Labour | Lee Wood | 452 | 25.5 | |
| UKIP | Peter Clayton | 368 | 20.8 | |
| Liberal Democrats | Matthew Davies | 182 | 10.3 | |
| Majority | | | | |
| Turnout | | 1,787 | 32.0 | |
| Conservative hold | | Swing | | |

=== Glascote ===
Glascote
| Party | Candidate | Votes | % | ±% |
|---|---|---|---|---|
| UKIP | Dennis Box | 483 | 36.3 | |
| Labour | Alice Bishop | 458 | 34.4 | |
| Conservative | Allan Lunn | 389 | 29.2 | |
| Majority | | | | |
| Turnout | | 1,357 | 25.0 | |
| UKIP gain from Labour | | Swing | | |

=== Mercian ===
Mercian
| Party | Candidate | Votes | % | ±% |
|---|---|---|---|---|
| Conservative | Moira Greatorex | 704 | 42.6 | |
| Labour Co-op | Gordon Moore | 573 | 34.6 | |
| UKIP | Gary Martin | 377 | 22.8 | |
| Majority | | | | |
| Turnout | | 1,678 | 32.0 | |
| Conservative hold | | Swing | | |

=== Spital ===
Spital
| Party | Candidate | Votes | % | ±% |
|---|---|---|---|---|
| Conservative | Paul Brindley | 915 | 49.0 | |
| Labour | Lisa Crane | 608 | 32.5 | |
| UKIP | Lisa Morris | 345 | 18.5 | |
| Majority | | | | |
| Turnout | | 1,902 | 34.0 | |
| Conservative hold | | Swing | | |

=== Stonydelph ===
Stonydelph
| Party | Candidate | Votes | % | ±% |
|---|---|---|---|---|
| Conservative | Stephen Doyle | 627 | 42.9 | |
| Labour | Sarah Daniels | 427 | 29.2 | |
| UKIP | Paul Sharman | 409 | 28.0 | |
| Majority | | | | |
| Turnout | | 1,478 | 26.0 | |
| Conservative hold | | Swing | | |

=== Trinity ===
Trinity
| Party | Candidate | Votes | % | ±% |
|---|---|---|---|---|
| Conservative | Jeremy Oates | 942 | 50.5 | |
| UKIP | Philip Young | 385 | 20.6 | |
| Labour | Sheila Bayley | 302 | 16.2 | |
| Green | Wil Goodridge | 128 | 6.9 | |
| Liberal Democrats | Roger Jones | 110 | 5.9 | |
| Majority | | | | |
| Turnout | | 1,880 | 33.0 | |
| Conservative hold | | Swing | | |

=== Wilnecote ===
Wilnecote
| Party | Candidate | Votes | % | ±% |
|---|---|---|---|---|
| Conservative | Roy Rogers | 833 | 42.9 | |
| Labour | Robert Bayley | 504 | 26.0 | |
| UKIP | Gail Bilcliff | 391 | 20.1 | |
| Green | Nicola Holmes | 213 | 11.0 | |
| Majority | | | | |
| Turnout | | 1,953 | 29.0 | |
| Conservative hold | | Swing | | |
