= 1999 Tamworth Borough Council election =

1999 UK local government election

An election was held on 6 May 1999 to elect members of Tamworth Borough Council in Staffordshire, England. One third of the council was up for election and the Labour party stayed in overall control of the council.

After the election, the composition of the council was

- Labour 27
- Conservative 2
- Independent 1

== Background ==
Before the election Labour had a big majority on the council with 26 seats, compared to 1 Conservative and 1 independent, with a further 2 seats vacant. Councillors defending seats in the election included the only independent, Margaret Clarke, in Stonydelph and Labour's Phil Dix, who had first been elected in 1958, in Bolehall. 2 seats were being contested in Wilnecote ward after the resignation of councillor Ken Lewis.

== Election result ==
The results had Labour easily keep control of the council, but with the Conservatives making 1 gain from Labour in Spital ward. The Conservative candidate, Ronald Cook, gained Spital by 201 votes over the Labour candidate.

Tamworth local election result 1999
Party	Seats	Gains	Losses	Net gain/loss	Seats %	Votes %	Votes	+/−
Labour	9	0	1	-1	81.8	59.5	8,845	
Conservative	1	1	0	+1	9.1	31.1	4,630	
Independent	1	0	0	0	9.1	4.1	604	
Liberal Democrats	0	0	0	0	0	5.3	794	

== Ward results ==
Amington
Party	Candidate	Votes	%	±%
Labour	John Tucker	839	57.4	
Conservative	Evelyn Rowe	622	42.6	
Majority		217	14.8	
Turnout		1,461	22	
Labour hold		Swing		

Belgrave
Party	Candidate	Votes	%	±%
Labour	Stuart Tonks	814	70.4	
Conservative	John Lees	343	29.6	
Majority		471	40.8	
Turnout		1,157	21	
Labour hold		Swing		

Bolehall
Party	Candidate	Votes	%	±%
Labour	Philip Dix	968	75.7	
Conservative	Valerie Beale	310	24.3	
Majority		658	51.4	
Turnout		1,278	24	
Labour hold		Swing		

Castle
Party	Candidate	Votes	%	±%
Labour	Ian Trenfield	1,204	68.0	
Conservative	Alan Lees	368	20.8	
Liberal Democrats	Jennifer Pinkett	199	11.2	
Majority		836	47.2	
Turnout		1,771	29	
Labour hold		Swing		

Glascote
Party	Candidate	Votes	%	±%
Labour	Stephen Holland	582	59.2	
Conservative	Brian Beale	160	16.3	
Independent	Christopher Cooke	139	14.1	
Liberal Democrats	Andrew Lee-Brown	102	10.4	
Majority		422	42.9	
Turnout		983	18	
Labour hold		Swing		

Mercian
Party	Candidate	Votes	%	±%
Labour	Gerald Latham	841	54.6	
Conservative	Andrew James	508	33.0	
Liberal Democrats	Geoffrey Blake	190	12.3	
Majority		333	21.6	
Turnout		1,539	32.4	
Labour hold		Swing		

Spital
Party	Candidate	Votes	%	±%
Conservative	Ronald Cook	952	51.5	
Labour	William Fuller	751	40.6	
Liberal Democrats	Jennifer Blake	146	7.9	
Majority		201	10.9	
Turnout		1,849	39	
Conservative gain from Labour		Swing		

Stonydelph
Party	Candidate	Votes	%	±%
Independent	Margaret Clarke	465	48.7	
Labour	Dennis Powick	362	37.9	
Conservative	James O'Grady	128	13.4	
Majority		103	10.8	
Turnout		955	16	
Independent hold		Swing		

Trinity
Party	Candidate	Votes	%	±%
Labour	David Foster	771	55.3	
Conservative	Kenneth Gant	467	33.5	
Liberal Democrats	Roger Jones	157	11.3	
Majority		304	21.8	
Turnout		1,395	26	
Labour hold		Swing		

Wilnecote (2)
Party	Candidate	Votes	%	±%
Labour	Joan Jenkins	883		
Labour	Alan Smith	830		
Conservative	Raymond Booth	387		
Conservative	Linda O'Grady	385		
Turnout		2,485	22	
Labour hold		Swing		
Labour hold		Swing		
