= 2016 Tamworth Borough Council election =

2016 UK local government election

Results of the 2016 Tamworth Borough Council election

The 2016 Tamworth Borough Council election took place on 5 May 2016 to elect members of Tamworth Borough Council in England. This was on the same day as other local elections. Overall turnout was 30.93%.

Ten seats were contested, Amington, Belgrave, Bolehall, Castle, Glascote, Mercian, Spital, Stonydelph, Trinity, and Wilnecote. Seven of the ten seats were held, while Belgrave and castle were gained by the Conservatives from Labour, and Glascote was gained by UKIP from Labour.
