= 2024 Tamworth Borough Council election =

2024 local election in England

- 2 May 2024

10 of the 30 seats on Tamworth Borough Council 16 seats needed for a majority

	First party	Second party
Leader	Carol Dean	Thomas Jay
Party	Labour	Conservative
Seats before	9	14
Seats won	18	8
Seat change	▲9	▼9
Popular vote	7,803	5,453
Percentage	49.1%	34.3%
Swing	▲5.2%	▼2.3%
	Third party
Party	Independent
Seats before	7
Seats won	4
Popular vote	576
Percentage	3.6%
Swing	▼11.7%
- Map of the results
Leader before election
Thomas Jay
Conservative
No overall control
Leader after election
Carol Dean
Labour

The 2024 Tamworth Borough Council election took place on 2 May 2024 to elect 10 of the 30 councillors on Tamworth Borough Council in Staffordshire, England. This was on the same day as other local elections across England.

In the previous election, the Conservatives lost control of the council losing 6 seats, whilst Labour gained 7 seats. Prior to the election, the council was under no overall control, being led by a coalition administration of the Conservatives and some of the independent councillors, led by Conservative councillor Thomas Jay.

In this election, the Conservatives lost 9 seats to Labour, giving Labour an overall majority on the council. The Labour group leader, Carol Dean, was formally appointed as leader of the council at the subsequent annual council meeting on 21 May 2024.

== Results ==
The overall results were:

2024 Tamworth Borough Council election
Party	This election			Full council			This election		
Party	Seats	Net	Seats %	Other	Total	Total %	Votes	Votes %	+/−
Labour	9	▲9	90.0	9	18	60.0	7,803	49.1	+5.2
Conservative	1	▼9	10.0	7	8	26.7	5,453	34.3	-2.3
Independent	0	Steady	0.0	4	4	13.3	576	3.6	-11.7
Reform UK	0	Steady	0.0	0	0	0.0	1,130	7.1	+6.6
UKIP	0	Steady	0.0	0	0	0.0	369	2.3	+1.3
Green	0	Steady	0.0	0	0	0.0	269	1.7	+0.4
Liberal Democrats	0	Steady	0.0	0	0	0.0	181	1.1	-0.3

Results by ward:

=== Amington ===
Amington
Party	Candidate	Votes	%	±%
Labour	Andy Wells	894	53.5	+2.8
Conservative	Donna Summers	756	45.2	−4.1
Majority		138	8.3	
Turnout		1671	24.9	
Labour gain from Conservative		Swing		

=== Belgrave ===
Belgrave
Party	Candidate	Votes	%	±%
Labour	Nova Arkney	720	54.3	+15.0
Conservative	Brett Beetham	347	26.2	−2.8
Reform UK	Yvette Bayliss	180	13.6	New
Green	John Scattergood	75	5.7	+2.1
Majority		373	28.1	
Turnout		1326	23.7	
Labour gain from Conservative		Swing		

=== Bolehall ===
Bolehall
Party	Candidate	Votes	%	±%
Labour	Ken Norchi	944	71.5	+11.5
Conservative	Michael Oates	359	27.2	+0.5
Majority		585	44.3	
Turnout		1320	23.5	
Labour gain from Conservative		Swing		

=== Castle ===
Castle
Party	Candidate	Votes	%	±%
Labour	Natalie Statham	898	47.6	+9.2
Conservative	Gordon Richard Moore	616	32.6	−3.4
Reform UK	David Bayliss	242	12.8	+8.4
Green	Joell Mayoh	122	6.5	+1.7
Majority		282	14.9	
Turnout		1888	28.1	
Labour gain from Conservative		Swing		

=== Glascote ===
Glascote
Party	Candidate	Votes	%	±%
Labour Co-op	Helen Hadley	574	47.8	+7.5
Conservative	James Nicholson-Roberts	250	20.8	−2.6
UKIP	Emma Turner	230	19.2	New
Independent	John Wade	140	11.7	New
Majority		324	27.0	
Turnout		1201	22.2	
Labour gain from Conservative		Swing		

=== Mercian ===
Mercian
Party	Candidate	Votes	%	±%
Labour	Pat Pallett	750	48.1	−7.8
Conservative	Chris Cooke	525	33.7	−10.4
Reform UK	David Tighe	182	11.7	New
Liberal Democrats	Robyn Barr	96	6.2	New
Majority		225	14.4	
Turnout		1559	28.5	
Labour gain from Conservative		Swing		

=== Spital ===
Spital
Party	Candidate	Votes	%	±%
Labour	Marion Couchman	795	39.6	+3.1
Conservative	Robert Steven Pritchard	762	38.0	+6.7
Independent	Bill Bryan	436	21.7	−10.6
Majority		33	1.6	
Turnout		2006	31.3	
Labour gain from Conservative		Swing		

=== Stonydelph ===
Stonydelph
Party	Candidate	Votes	%	±%
Labour	Margaret Clarke	643	46.0	+7.1
Conservative	Andy Cooper	535	38.2	−3.4
UKIP	Robert Bilcliff	139	9.9	+3.6
Green	Adam Bayliss	72	5.1	−0.4
Majority		108	7.8	
Turnout		1399	24.9	
Labour gain from Conservative		Swing		

=== Trinity ===
Trinity
Party	Candidate	Votes	%	±%
Conservative	Martin Summers	733	42.2	−5.7
Labour	Denise Bayley	616	35.5	−2.9
Reform UK	Ian Cooper	292	16.8	New
Liberal Democrats	Helen Miller-Viney	85	4.9	−8.8
Majority		117	6.7	
Turnout		1735	30.3	
Conservative hold		Swing		

=== Wilnecote ===
Wilnecote
Party	Candidate	Votes	%	±%
Labour	Dave Foster	969	54.5	+12.3
Conservative	Daniel Lee Maycock	570	32.1	−0.4
Reform UK	Mark Lawton	234	13.2	New
Majority		399	22.4	
Turnout		1777	25.9	
Labour gain from Conservative		Swing		

== Subsequent by-elections ==
=== Spital ===
Spital: 5 March 2026
Party	Candidate	Votes	%	±%
Reform UK	Wayne Luca	719	44.6	N/A
Green	Stephen Andrews	337	20.4	N/A
Conservative	Brett Beetham	319	19.4	▼18.9
Labour	Steve Holland	273	16.6	▼23.4
Majority		382	23.2	▲21.6
Turnout				
Reform UK gain from Labour		Swing	▲34.0	

The by-election was caused by the death of Labour councillor Marion Couchman in December 2025.
