= Albert Addison =

Albert Addison may refer to:

- Percy Addison (Albert Percy Addison, 1875–1952), officer in the Royal Navy
- Albert Christopher Addison (1862–1935), English writer
