= 1998 Tamworth Borough Council election =

1998 UK local government election

The 1998 Tamworth Borough Council election took place on 7 May 1998 to elect members of Tamworth Borough Council in Staffordshire, England. One third of the council was up for election and the Labour party stayed in overall control of the council.

After the election, the composition of the council was

- Labour 28
- Conservative 1
- Independent 1

== Background ==
Before the election Labour controlled the council with 25 seats, compared to 2 Conservatives, 2 Socialist Labour Party and 1 independent. In the lead up to the election 2 former independents had formed the Conservative group on the council, while 2 Labour councillors defected to the Socialist Labour Party.

10 seats were contested in the election with both the Labour and Conservative parties contesting every seat, while the Liberal Democrats stood in 5 seats. The Conservatives were hoping to double their seats on the council to 4 on the back of disappointment with the national Labour government. However Labour believed voters would back them as they said the council was providing good services.

== Election result ==
The results saw Labour win all 10 seats contested to hold 28 of the 30 seats on the council. Labour held the 7 seats they had been defending, gained a seat from the Conservatives in Stonydelph and retook another 2 seats from defectors to the Socialist Labour Party. This was the first time in at least 20 years that any party had won all the seats contested in an election for the council. Turnout in the election was low with only 16.2% voting in Stonydelph.

Labour said the results showed "that Labour Party policies have been a resounding success", however the Conservatives said their party had increased the share of the vote laying foundations for 1999.

Tamworth local election result 1998
Party	Seats	Gains	Losses	Net gain/loss	Seats %	Votes %	Votes	+/−
Labour	10	3	0	+3	100.0			
Conservative	0	0	1	-1	0			
Socialist Labour	0	0	2	-2	0			
