= 2002 Tamworth Borough Council election =

2002 UK local government election

Results of the 2002 Tamworth Borough Council election

Elections to Tamworth Borough Council were held on 2 May 2002. The whole council was up for election with boundary changes since the last election in 2000. The Labour Party stayed in overall control of the council.

After the election, the composition of the council was:

- Labour 22
- Conservative 8

== Election result ==
Tamworth local election result 2002
| Party | Seats | Gains | Losses | Net gain/loss | Seats % | Votes % | Votes | +/− |
|---|---|---|---|---|---|---|---|---|
| Labour | 22 | | | +5 | 73.3 | 51.4 | 20,130 | +14.5 |
| Conservative | 8 | | | -5 | 26.7 | 43.4 | 16,986 | -9.9 |
| Liberal Democrats | 0 | | | 0 | 0.0 | 3.6 | 1,422 | -6.3 |
| Independent | 0 | | | 0 | 0.0 | 1.6 | 621 | +1.6 |

== Ward results ==
Amington (3)
| Party | Candidate | Votes | % | ±% |
|---|---|---|---|---|
| Conservative | John Garner | 685 | | |
| Conservative | Evelyn Rowe | 644 | | |
| Labour | Michael Smith | 637 | | |
| Labour | Michael Cooper | 612 | | |
| Conservative | John Wells | 608 | | |
| Labour | Richard McDermid | 589 | | |
| Liberal Democrats | Zoe Blake | 232 | | |
| Turnout | | 4,007 | 23 | |

Belgrave (3)
| Party | Candidate | Votes | % | ±% |
|---|---|---|---|---|
| Labour | Nigel Brindley | 658 | | |
| Labour | David Foster | 630 | | |
| Labour | Kenneth Lewis | 608 | | |
| Conservative | Mary Oates | 472 | | |
| Conservative | John Lees | 460 | | |
| Conservative | James Ward | 442 | | |
| Turnout | | 3,270 | 21 | |

Bolehall (3)
| Party | Candidate | Votes | % | ±% |
|---|---|---|---|---|
| Labour | Kenneth Norchi | 893 | | |
| Labour | Philip Dix | 846 | | |
| Labour | Peter Seekings | 822 | | |
| Conservative | Diane Wells | 520 | | |
| Conservative | Francis Worrell | 508 | | |
| Conservative | Ronald Gibson | 485 | | |
| Turnout | | 4,074 | 27 | |

Castle (3)
| Party | Candidate | Votes | % | ±% |
|---|---|---|---|---|
| Labour | Marion Couchman | 722 | | |
| Labour | John Faulkner | 721 | | |
| Labour | Ian Trenfield | 693 | | |
| Conservative | Marie Booth | 556 | | |
| Conservative | Ian Cooper | 553 | | |
| Conservative | Alan Lees | 504 | | |
| Liberal Democrats | Jennifer Pinkett | 272 | | |
| Independent | Ian Gibbons | 205 | | |
| Turnout | | 4,226 | 28 | |

Glascote (3)
| Party | Candidate | Votes | % | ±% |
|---|---|---|---|---|
| Labour | Ronald Birbeck | 566 | | |
| Labour | Dennis Powick | 518 | | |
| Labour | Stephen Savage | 507 | | |
| Independent | Christopher Cook | 416 | | |
| Conservative | Diane Reece | 278 | | |
| Conservative | James McKay | 277 | | |
| Conservative | Paul White | 234 | | |
| Turnout | | 2,796 | 20 | |

Mercian (3)
| Party | Candidate | Votes | % | ±% |
|---|---|---|---|---|
| Labour | William Fuller | 747 | | |
| Labour | John Garforth | 726 | | |
| Labour | Gerald Latham | 704 | | |
| Conservative | Maureen Gant | 699 | | |
| Conservative | Wyonnie Boughton | 658 | | |
| Conservative | Geoffrey Parsons | 646 | | |
| Liberal Democrats | Geoffrey Blake | 294 | | |
| Turnout | | 4,474 | 30 | |

Spital (3)
| Party | Candidate | Votes | % | ±% |
|---|---|---|---|---|
| Conservative | Kenneth Gant | 1,085 | | |
| Conservative | Ronald Cook | 1,013 | | |
| Conservative | Bruce Boughton | 771 | | |
| Labour | Derek Thompson | 674 | | |
| Labour | Garry Hirons | 606 | | |
| Labour | Karen Hirons | 603 | | |
| Liberal Democrats | Jennifer Blake | 335 | | |
| Turnout | | 5,087 | 38 | |

Stonydelph (3)
| Party | Candidate | Votes | % | ±% |
|---|---|---|---|---|
| Labour | Margaret Clarke | 582 | | |
| Labour | John Tucker | 516 | | |
| Labour | Brian Granger | 495 | | |
| Conservative | Andrew James | 383 | | |
| Conservative | Michael Oates | 370 | | |
| Conservative | Debra James | 367 | | |
| Turnout | | 2,713 | 17 | |

Trinity (3)
| Party | Candidate | Votes | % | ±% |
|---|---|---|---|---|
| Conservative | Derek Jones | 741 | | |
| Conservative | Jeremy Oates | 717 | | |
| Conservative | Gerald Pinner | 717 | | |
| Labour | Patricia Dix | 702 | | |
| Labour | Audrey Poulton | 651 | | |
| Labour | Kevan Garratt | 648 | | |
| Liberal Democrats | Roger Jones | 289 | | |
| Turnout | | 4,465 | 30 | |

Wilnecote (3)
| Party | Candidate | Votes | % | ±% |
|---|---|---|---|---|
| Labour | Mary Lewis | 844 | | |
| Labour | Joan Jenkins | 835 | | |
| Labour | Alan Smith | 775 | | |
| Conservative | Brian Beale | 569 | | |
| Conservative | Christine Fidler | 522 | | |
| Conservative | Marguarite Jones | 502 | | |
| Turnout | | 4,047 | 25 | |
