= 2008 Tamworth Borough Council election =

2008 UK local government election

Results of the 2008 Tamworth Borough Council election

The 2008 Tamworth Borough Council election took place on 1 May 2008 to elect members of Tamworth Borough Council in Staffordshire, England. One third of the council was up for election and the Conservative Party stayed in overall control of the council.

After the election, the composition of the council was:

- Conservative 24
- Labour 5
- Independent 1

== Background ==
Before the election the Conservatives held 23 seats, Labour had 6 and there was 1 independent councillor. 10 seats were being contested, with the Conservatives defending 8 and Labour 2. Among the councillors defending seats were the former Conservative council leader Ron Cook in Spittal ward and the Mayoress Mary Oates in Wilnecote. Labour would have needed to gain every Conservative seat that was being contested in order to deprive the Conservatives of a majority.

== Election result ==
The results in Tamworth were one of the first local election results to be declared and saw just one seat change hands. The Conservative Party gained Galscote ward from Labour to hold 24 seats, compared to 5 for Labour. Galscote was taken by Conservative, Nicola Annandale, who was the fiancee of the leader of the council Jeremy Oates. Overall turnout was 29.97%.

The Conservative leader of the council Jeremy Oates said that voters were "fed up of party politics and have voted on the delivery of services". However the Labour member of parliament for Tamworth, Brian Jenkins said that people had wanted "to give the Government a kicking" and that the election had been "all about national issues".

Tamworth local election result 2008
Party	Seats	Gains	Losses	Net gain/loss	Seats %	Votes %	Votes	+/−
Conservative	9	1	0	+1	90.0	49.5	8,477	+4.5
Labour	1	0	1	-1	10.0	36.7	6,285	-1.0
Independent	0	0	0	0	0.0	6.3	1,072	-2.6
Liberal Democrats	0	0	0	0	0.0	5.7	981	-0.4
BNP	0	0	0	0	0.0	1.7	293	-0.5

== Ward results ==
Amington
Party	Candidate	Votes	%	±%
Conservative	Evelyn Rowe	887	48.7	+5.5
Labour	Mark Fielding	680	37.3	−1.6
Independent	James Mckay	255	14.0	−3.9
Majority		207	11.4	+7.1
Turnout		1,822	30.1	−1.9
Conservative hold		Swing		

Belgrave
Party	Candidate	Votes	%	±%
Conservative	Robert Pritchard	785	50.1	+1.3
Labour	John Harper	587	37.4	+1.6
Independent	Kevin Harcourt-Taylor	196	12.5	−2.9
Majority		198	12.7	−0.3
Turnout		1,568	28.6	−0.5
Conservative hold		Swing		

Bolehall
Party	Candidate	Votes	%	±%
Labour	John Faulkner	864	54.9	−3.1
Conservative	Simon Clements	710	45.1	+3.1
Majority		154	9.8	−6.2
Turnout		1,574	28.6	−2.9
Labour hold		Swing		

Castle
Party	Candidate	Votes	%	±%
Conservative	Chippy Lees	963	52.6	+5.0
Labour	Garry Hirons	651	35.6	−2.6
Liberal Democrats	Jennifer Pinkett	216	11.8	−2.4
Majority		312	17.0	+7.6
Turnout		1,830	33.6	−0.9
Conservative hold		Swing		

Glascote
Party	Candidate	Votes	%	±%
Conservative	Nicola Annandale	675	51.6	+25.0
Labour	Dennis Powick	634	48.4	+15.9
Majority		41	3.2	
Turnout		1,309	24.3	−1.3
Conservative gain from Labour		Swing		

Mercian
Party	Candidate	Votes	%	±%
Conservative	Samuel Munn	763	40.2	+3.7
Labour	Neil Fuller	526	27.7	−1.3
Independent	Richard Kingstone	403	21.3	−1.0
Liberal Democrats	Geoffrey Blake	204	10.8	−1.4
Majority		237	12.5	+5.0
Turnout		1,896	36.3	−1.7
Conservative hold		Swing		

Spital
Party	Candidate	Votes	%	±%
Conservative	Ronald Cook	1,053	51.3	−1.6
Labour	Mike Cooke	728	35.4	+3.2
Liberal Democrats	Jennifer Blake	273	13.3	−1.6
Majority		325	15.9	−4.8
Turnout		2,054	37.2	−1.3
Conservative hold		Swing		

Stonydelph
Party	Candidate	Votes	%	±%
Conservative	Danny Cook	689	47.8	+9.2
Labour	Margaret Clarke	458	31.8	−4.5
BNP	Lynne Smith	293	20.3	−4.8
Majority		231	16.0	+13.7
Turnout		1,440	25.0	−2.4
Conservative hold		Swing		

Trinity
Party	Candidate	Votes	%	±%
Conservative	Gerald Pinner	1,017	57.3	+3.1
Labour	David Foster	471	26.5	−5.4
Liberal Democrats	Roger Jones	288	16.2	+2.3
Majority		546	30.8	+8.5
Turnout		1,776	30.2	−3.8
Conservative hold		Swing		

Wilnecote
Party	Candidate	Votes	%	±%
Conservative	Mary Oates	935	50.8	−2.9
Labour	Kenneth Lewis	686	37.3	−9.0
Independent	Andrew Whiles	218	11.9	+11.9
Majority		249	13.5	+6.1
Turnout		1,839	27.1	−1.9
Conservative hold		Swing		
