= Glascote =

Area of Tamworth, England

Coordinates: 52.624519°N 1.667962°W

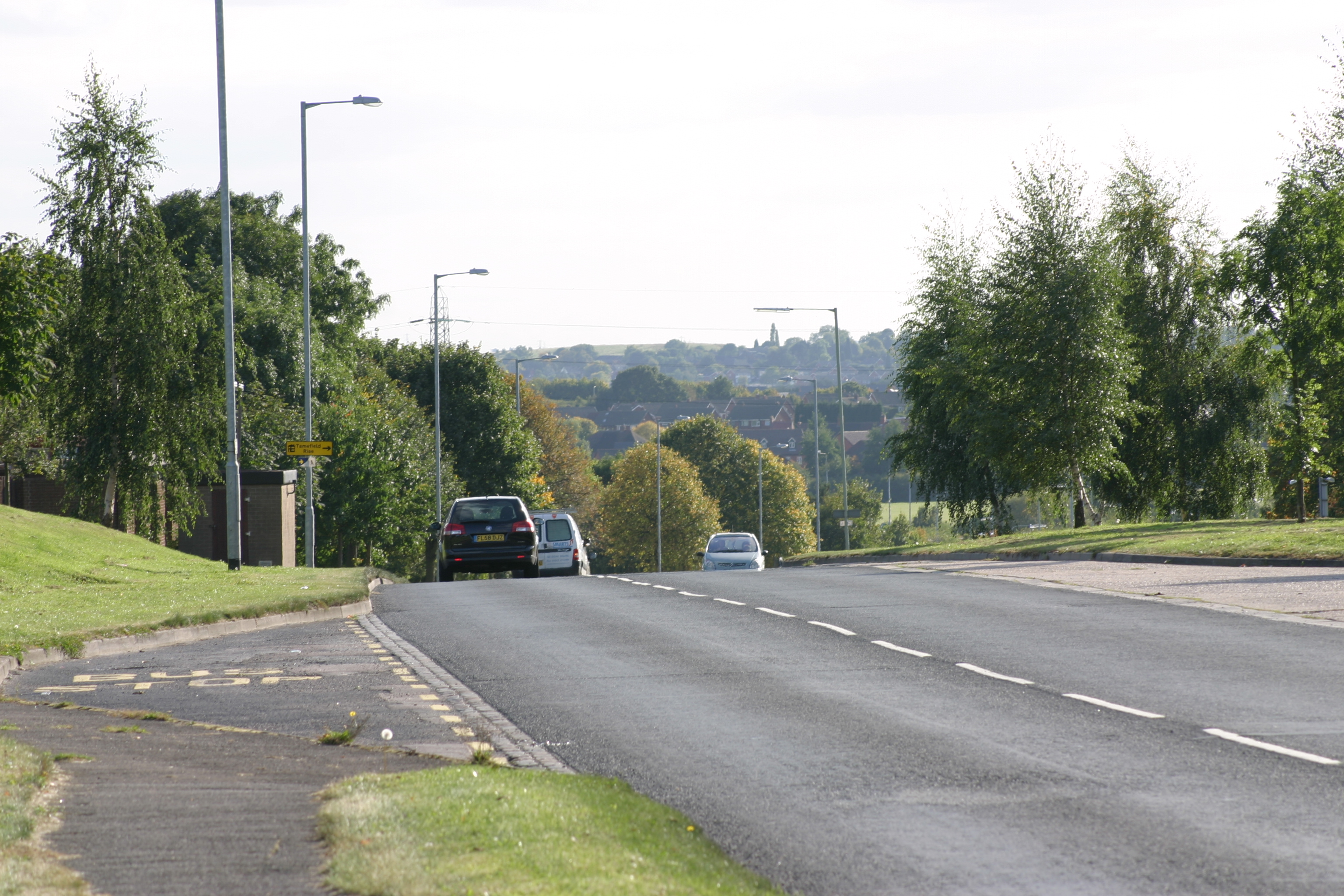
- Marlborough Way in Glascote

- Location within Staffordshire
- Population: 8,344 (2001)
- OS grid reference: SK2203
- District: Tamworth
- Shire county: Staffordshire
- Region: West Midlands
- Country: England
- Sovereign state: United Kingdom
- Post town: Tamworth
- Postcode district: B77
- Dialling code: 01827
- Police: Staffordshire
- Fire: Staffordshire
- Ambulance: West Midlands
- UK Parliament: Tamworth

Glascote is an area of Tamworth in Staffordshire, England, which traditionally lies within the historic county of Warwickshire. The area centres on the Glascote Road, and is mainly residential with a few convenience stores and pubs.

== History ==
Glascote is derived from the Old English word for glass and ‘cot’, meaning a hut. This suggests ‘a glass workshop’ since ‘cot’ is usually associated with some form of industrial process.

The manor of Glascote dates back to the 12th century. It was owned by the Longueville and Ferrers families, and eventually became part of the landholdings of Lord Townshend, in 1815. It was acquired by the Corporation of Tamworth in 1897 along with the Bolehall estate.

Sitting on the Glascote Road that runs from Tamworth town centre the village of Glascote is the oldest part containing mainly Victorian Terrace houses whilst much of Glascote located near the Marlborough Way dates from the post 1960s when the area grew rapidly and as a result much of the area has New Town style architecture.

== Demographics ==
According to the 2001 census the population for Glascote is 8,344. White British is by far the largest population making up 97% of the population.

== Governance ==
Glascote has its own ward within Tamworth Borough Council also named Glascote. The ward has 3 councillors who are Mark Abley (Reform, serving since 2026), Helen Hadley (Labour, serving since 2024) and Chris Bain (Labour, serving since 2023). Tamworth Borough Council, which Glascote is part of, is entirely unparished.

Glascote is part of The Cotes/Two Rivers electoral division in Staffordshire County Council and is represented by Nicholas Thompson (Reform).

Glascote is part of the Tamworth Parliamentary Constituency and it is currently represented by the Labour MP Sarah Edwards, who has held the seat since the 2023 Tamworth by-election.

=== Civil parish ===
Bolehall and Glascote was formerly a township in the parish of Tamworth. From 1896 Bolehall and Glascote was a civil parish in its own right, on 13 November 1957 the parish was renamed to "Glascote", on 1 April 1965 the parish was abolished and merged with Tamworth. In 1961 the parish had a population of 2538.

== Religion ==
According to the 2001 census 72% of the population described their religion as Christian, 20% did not have a religion and 7% refused to state their religion with other faiths making up less than 0.01% of the population with just 49 adherents.

Glascote is part of the Anglican Diocese of Lichfield.

== Transport ==
The A5 runs through Glascote as part of the £26,000,000, 5 miles (8.0 km) long Fazeley, Two Gates and Wilnecote Bypass which opened in July 1995, acting as a bypass of the old Watling Street which runs through Wilnecote.

Glascote is equidistant from Tamworth railway station in Tamworth town centre and Wilnecote railway station in Wilnecote. Wilnecote railway station receives a limited service in comparison to Tamworth railway station.

The nearest airport is Birmingham Airport.

The buses that serve the area are: 4,7,7A,7E,16A.

== Media ==
The local paper for Glascote is the Tamworth Herald.

THE Tamworth Trader was a local paper that was a free paper for advertising and lonely hearts.

The local commercial radio station for Glascote is Touch Radio Burton, Lichfield and Tamworth which is broadcast from Tamworth town centre. The BBC Local Radio is BBC Radio WM Broadcast from Birmingham.

== See also ==
- Listed buildings in Tamworth, Staffordshire
