= St. Gabriel's RC Primary School =

St. Gabriel's RC Primary School may refer to:

- St. Gabriel's Catholic Primary School, Belgrave, Tamworth, Staffordshire, UK
- St. Gabriel's R.C. Primary School, Rochdale, UK
- St Gabriel's Catholic Primary School, Stoke-on-Trent, UK
- St Gabriel's R C Primary School, Prestonpans, UK
