= 2012 Tamworth Borough Council election =

2012 UK local government election

Results of the 2012 Tamworth Borough Council election

The 2012 Tamworth Borough Council election was held on 3 May 2012 to elect members of the Tamworth Borough Council. Ten seats were up for grabs; the Labour Party won 60% of the seats with 48.70% of the vote. The Labour Party became the majority in the council after a Conservative win in 2011.

Tamworth Borough Council election 2012
Party	Seats	Gains	Losses	Net gain/loss	Seats %	Votes %	Votes	+/−
Conservative	4		-2		40%	44.30%	6,950	
Green	0				0%	1.90%	292	
Independent	0				0%	2.80%	436	
Labour	6	+4			60%	48.70%	7,644	
Liberal Democrats	0				0%	2.30%	361	

== Ward results ==
Amington (1 councillor)
Party	Candidate	Votes	%	±%
Labour	Tom Peaple	723	46.80%	
Conservative	Evelyn Rowe	822	53.20%	
Majority		822	53.20%	−3.70%
Turnout		1,545	26.20%	−11.50%
Conservative hold		Swing		

Belgrave (1 councillor)
Party	Candidate	Votes	%	±%
Labour	Marion Couchman	694	50.50%	
Conservative	Joy Goodall	679	49.50%	
Majority		694	50.50%	−1.20%
Turnout		1,373	24.00%	−9.80%
Labour hold		Swing		

Bolehall (1 councillor)
Party	Candidate	Votes	%	±%
Conservative	Warren Clegg	435	29.40%	−11.90%
Labour	John Faulkner	1,047	70.60%	
Majority		1,047	70.60%	+11.90%
Turnout		1,482	25.50%	10.00%
Labour hold		Swing		

Castle (1 councillor)
Party	Candidate	Votes	%	±%
Green	Simon Johnson	162	9.10%	+0.80%
Conservative	Chipy Lees	766	42.90%	
Labour	Matthew McDermid	856	48.00%	
Majority		856	48.00%	−0.60%
Turnout		1,784	31.60%	−7.60%
Labour hold		Swing		

Glascote (1 councillor)
Party	Candidate	Votes	%	±%
Independent	Ken Forrest	436	33.80%	
Labour	Gary Hirons	588	45.50%	
Conservative	Martyn Price	267	20.70%	
Majority		588	45.50%	+5.50%
Turnout		1,291	23.10%	−16.10%
Labour hold		Swing		

Mercian (1 councillor)
Party	Candidate	Votes	%	±%
Green	Lisa Crane	130	7.70%	+2.00%
Liberal Democrats	Tony Harvey	85	5.00%	
Conservative	Richard Kingstone	805	47.70%	
Labour	Andy Whiles	668	39.60%	
Majority		805	47.70%	+0.90%
Turnout		1,688	32.20%	−9.70%
Conservative hold		Swing		

Spital (1 councillor)
Party	Candidate	Votes	%	±%
Liberal Democrats	Jennifer Pinkett	155	8.80%	−0.60%
Labour	Gerald Pinner	701	39.60%	
Conservative	Richard Pritchard	914	51.60%	
Majority		914	51.60%	+ 4.80%
Turnout		1,170	32.40%	−10.70%
Conservative hold		Swing		

Stonydelph (1 councillor)
Party	Candidate	Votes	%	±%
Conservative	Moira Greatorex	633	47.60%	
Labour	Margaret Clarke	696	52.40%	+3.10%
Majority		696	52.40%	+1.70%
Turnout		1,329	23.00%	−7.80%
Labour hold		Swing		

Trinity (1 councillor)
Party	Candidate	Votes	%	±%
Conservative	Daniel Cook	890	53.10%	
Labour	Darryl Dean	665	39.70%	
Liberal Democrats	Roger Jones	121	7.20%	−2.20%
Majority		890	53.10%	−3.30%
Turnout		1,676	28.40%	−11.40%
Conservative hold		Swing		

Wilnecote (1 councillor)
Party	Candidate	Votes	%	±%
Labour	Patrick Standen	1,006	57.70%	+11.80%
Conservative	Mary Oates	739	42.30%	
Majority		1,006	57.70%	+3.60%
Turnout		1,745	25.20%	−10.50%
Labour hold		Swing		
