= Tamworth Enterprise College =

Location
- Birds Bush Road; Belgrave; Tamworth, Staffordshire, B77 2NE; England; 52.61616°N 1.66921°W

Information
- Type: Academy
- Local authority: Staffordshire County Council
- Trust: Lift Schools
- Department for Education URN: 138435 Tables
- Ofsted: Reports
- Chair: Mark Gurney
- Head teacher: Jon Spears
- Gender: Coeducational
- Age: 11 to 16
- Website: https://sites.google.com/aetinet.org/tec

Tamworth Enterprise College (formerly Belgrave High School) is a coeducational secondary school with academy status in Tamworth, Staffordshire, England, which pupils attend from the ages of 11 to 16 years old.

The school was founded with just one building called "The same year Block" in 1978, and in 1981 added the "E Block" for its additional pupils. The school canteen was originally placed in the White Block but was later moved to a more central location within the school. The area that was occupied by the old canteen is now used for classroom teaching. Since then, the school canteen has been extended, with a new purpose-built extension added beside the existing kitchen area. The school is sponsored by the Academies Enterprise Trust.

The Governmental department Ofsted gave Belgrave a grade 2 "good" rating in their 2009 inspection; however, it was judged in 2011 as not satisfactory before being graded as requires improvement in the summer of 2004.

== Notable former pupils ==
=== Belgrave High School ===
- Treyc Cohen, X Factor 2010 finalist
- Ashley Williams, Bristol and Wales International footballer
- Gillian McAllister, author
