= Tamworth Herald =

Local newspaper

- Type: Weekly newspaper
- Format: Tabloid
- Owner(s): Reach plc
- Founded: 1868
- Headquarters: Tamworth; Staffordshire; England
- Circulation: 2,982 (as of 2022)
- Website: Tamworth Herald

The Tamworth Herald is a weekly tabloid newspaper published every Thursday in Tamworth, Staffordshire, England, with a cover price of £1.40. The newspaper covers events across Tamworth and south Staffordshire, as well as North Warwickshire. The Herald was named ‘Newspaper of the Year’ at the Midland Media Awards in 2015 and 2016. In November 2018 the Herald celebrated its 150th anniversary with a party in the Town Hall

== History ==
The newspaper was founded as a broadsheet in 1868 by businessman Daniel Addison, and the original offices were based in Silver Street. A `flyer` introducing the weekly Tamworth Herald advertised as a weekly newspaper for Tamworth with coverage of surrounding districts of Fazeley Wilnecote Glascote Bolehall Polesworth Austrey Newton Clifton Hopwas Hints Wigginton Elford.

The first edition of the Tamworth Herald published on 8 August 1868 carried this advertisement on the front page....

D Addison Newsagent Bookseller and Stationer Silver Street Tamworth. D.A. takes the present opportunity of tendering his sincere thanks to his friends and public generally for the patronage with which he has been favoured since his commencement in business, and begs to assure his numerous friends that their future favours will receive the same prompt attention and care which has hitherto gained for him their confidence and support. Bibles, Prayer Books, Church Services, Tamworth Church Hymn Books, Ledgers, Journals, Cash and Day Books &c in stock and to order. All the current monthly and other Magazines, and the London & Provincial daily and weekly newspapers punctually supplied on the day of publication. Miscellaneous orders for new books &c executed with despatch.

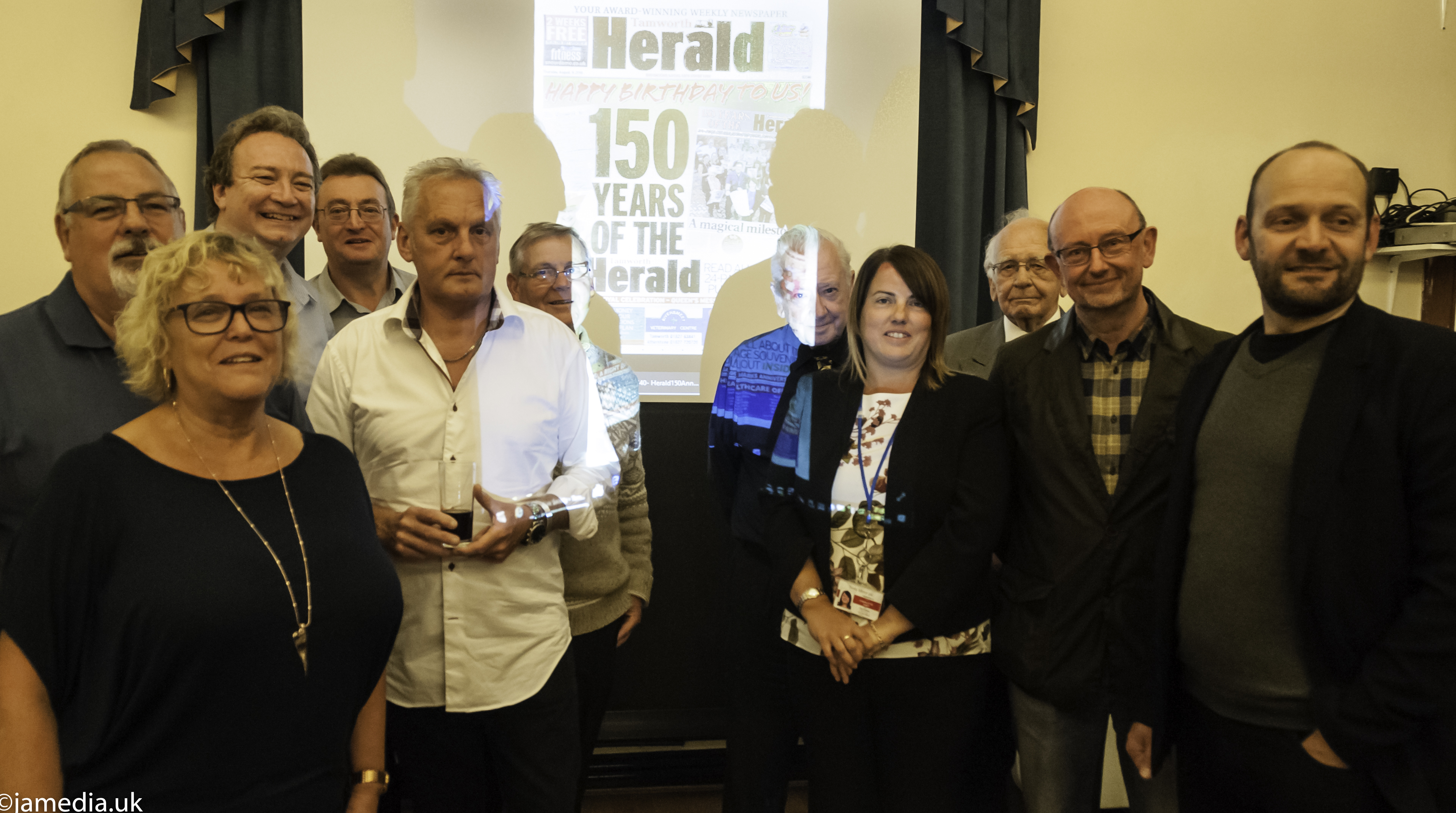
Tamworth Herald Editors from the period 1999 to 2018 with other former staff

Mr Addison continued to publish the paper for nine years until 29 October 1877, when it was taken over by a consortium of leading townsmen. The paper now has its offices on the town's Ventura Park industrial estate. Until the early 2000s, the Herald was published on a Friday, but the day of publication has now been switched to a Thursday. Three editions of the paper are currently published; one for Tamworth, and an edition each for Coleshill and Atherstone. Much of the content in all three is the same, although the front pages vary, concentrating on local issues in the different areas.

In November 2018 the Herald celebrated its 150th anniversary with a party in the Town Hall The Executive Editor Charlotte Hart and former assistant Editor John Harper gave video interviews on this historic occasion. As part of the 150th anniversary celebrations former assistant editor Jon Harper gave a talk on the history of the Herald in Tamworth. See picture of the Editors from the period 1999 to 2018 with other former staff.

The Herald is owned by Central Independent Newspapers. The CIN group owns a number of other news publications around the Midlands, including the Sutton Coldfield Observer. In 2012, Local World acquired CIN owner Northcliffe Media from Daily Mail & General Trust. In 2018 Trinity-Mirror became Reach plc.

== See also ==
- Albert Christopher Addison
