= 2021 Tamworth Borough Council election =

2021 UK local government election

Map showing the results of the 2021 Tamworth Borough Council election

The Tamworth Borough Council election for 2021 occurred on 6 May 2021 to elect members of Tamworth Borough Council in England. This coincided with other local elections taking place on the same day.

== Results summary ==
2021 Tamworth Borough Council election
Party	This election			Full council			This election		
Party	Seats	Net	Seats %	Other	Total	Total %	Votes	Votes %	+/−
Conservative	10	▲5	100.0	16	26	86.7	10,431	56.9	+14.5
Labour	0	▼2	0.0	3	3	10.0	5,268	28.7	-0.4
UKIP	0	▼2	0.0	1	1	3.3	816	4.4	-18.2
Independent	0	▼1	0.0	0	0	0.0	1,464	8.0	+7.2
Green	0	Steady	0.0	0	0	0.0	365	2.0	-1.3

== Ward results ==
=== Amington ===
Amington
Party	Candidate	Votes	%	±%
Conservative	Martin Summers	1,161	60.4	+12.7
Labour Co-op	Lewis Smith	582	30.3	+4.5
Green	Andrew Tilley	100	5.2	−1.2
UKIP	Wayne Hughes	80	4.2	−15.8
Majority		579	30.1	
Turnout		1,923	30.4	
Conservative hold		Swing	▲4.1	

=== Belgrave ===
Belgrave
Party	Candidate	Votes	%	±%
Conservative	Richard Ford	925	60.9	+21.6
Labour Co-op	Robert Bayley	504	33.2	+6.2
UKIP	Emma Turner	91	6.0	−12.7
Majority		421	27.7	
Turnout		1,520	21.4	
Conservative hold		Swing	▲7.7	

=== Bolehall ===
Bolehall
Party	Candidate	Votes	%	±%
Conservative	John Harper	1,016	58.8	+27.8
Labour Co-op	Jan Wadrup	623	36.0	−8.6
UKIP	Tracey Williams	90	5.2	−19.2
Majority		393	22.8	
Turnout		1,729	30.8	
Conservative gain from Labour		Swing	▲18.2	

=== Castle ===
Castle
Party	Candidate	Votes	%	±%
Conservative	Peter Thurgood	1,104	57.1	+13.7
Labour Co-op	Lee Wood	577	29.8	+4.3
Green	Kevin Jones	166	8.6	N/A
UKIP	Peter Clayton	86	4.4	−16.4
Majority		527	27.3	
Turnout		1,933	32.8	
Conservative hold		Swing	▲4.7	

=== Glascote ===
Glascote
Party	Candidate	Votes	%	±%
Conservative	John Wade	667	48.8	+19.6
Labour	Sarah Daniels	344	25.1	−9.3
Independent	Chris Cooke	172	12.6	N/A
Green	James Platt	99	7.2	N/A
UKIP	Mark Hopkins	86	6.3	−30.0
Majority		323	23.7	
Turnout		1,368	25.0	
Conservative gain from UKIP		Swing	▲14.5	

=== Mercian ===
Mercian
Party	Candidate	Votes	%	±%
Conservative	Andrew Cooper	764	39.1	−3.5
Independent	Richard Kingstone	760	38.9	N/A
Labour Co-op	Gordon Moore	386	19.8	−14.8
UKIP	Gary Martin	43	2.2	−20.6
Majority		4	0.2	
Turnout		1,953	35.6	
Conservative gain from Independent		Swing	▼21.2	

=== Spital ===
Spital
Party	Candidate	Votes	%	±%
Conservative	Robert Pritchard	1,241	55.3	+6.3
Labour	David Foster	564	25.1	−7.4
Independent	Huw Loxton	391	17.4	N/A
UKIP	Lisa Morris	47	2.1	−16.4
Majority		677	30.2	
Turnout		2,243	37.0	
Conservative hold		Swing	▲6.9	

=== Stonydelph ===
Stonydelph
Party	Candidate	Votes	%	±%
Conservative	Jason Jones	919	60.2	+17.3
Labour Co-op	Ben Clarke	475	31.1	+1.9
UKIP	Robert Bilcliff	133	8.7	−19.3
Majority		444	29.1	
Turnout		1,527	27.2	
Conservative gain from UKIP		Swing	▲7.7	

=== Trinity ===
Trinity
Party	Candidate	Votes	%	±%
Conservative	Daniel Cook	1,453	70.8	+20.3
Labour	Denise Bayley	514	25.0	+8.8
UKIP	Philip Young	86	4.2	−16.4
Majority		939	45.8	
Turnout		2,053	36.0	
Conservative hold		Swing	▲11.5	

=== Wilnecote ===
Wilnecote
Party	Candidate	Votes	%	±%
Conservative	Daniel Maycock	1,181	56.4	+13.5
Labour Co-op	Patrick Standen	699	33.4	+7.4
Independent	Gareth Roberts	141	6.7	N/A
UKIP	Gail Bilcliff	74	3.5	−16.6
Majority		482	23.0	
Turnout		2,095	30.2	
Conservative gain from Labour		Swing	▲3.1	

== By-elections ==
=== Spital ===
Spital: 3 February 2022
Party	Candidate	Votes	%	±%
Conservative	Christian Cooke	613	43.6	−11.7
Independent	Huw Loxton	482	34.3	+16.8
Labour	Dave Foster	311	22.1	−3.0
Majority		131	9.5	
Turnout		1,415	22.9	
Conservative hold		Swing	▼14.3	
