= 2007 Tamworth Borough Council election =

2007 UK local government election

Results of the 2007 Tamworth Borough Council election

Elections to Tamworth Borough Council were held on 3 May 2007. One third of the council was up for election and the Conservative Party stayed in overall control of the council. Overall turnout was 31.9%

After the election, the composition of the council was:

- Conservative 24
- Labour 5
- Independent 1

== Election result ==
Tamworth local election result 2007
Party	Seats	Gains	Losses	Net gain/loss	Seats %	Votes %	Votes	+/−
Conservative	8	3	0	+3	80.0	45.0	8,183	-5.9%
Labour	1	0	3	-3	10.0	37.7	6,856	-3.8%
Independent	1	0	0	0	10.0	8.9	1,624	+8.9%
Liberal Democrats	0	0	0	0	0	6.1	1,109	-1.5%
BNP	0	0	0	0	0	2.2	395	+2.2%

== Ward results ==
Amington
Party	Candidate	Votes	%	±%
Conservative	John Wells	841	43.2	−13.4
Labour	Julie Holland	757	38.9	−4.5
Independent	James Mckay	348	17.9	+17.9
Majority		84	4.3	−8.9
Turnout		1,946	32.0	−1.1
Conservative hold		Swing		

Belgrave
Party	Candidate	Votes	%	±%
Conservative	Steve Nicklin	776	48.8	−8.2
Labour	Gary Hirons	569	35.8	−7.2
Independent	Kevin Taylor	245	15.4	+15.4
Majority		207	13.0	−1.0
Turnout		1,590	29.1	−0.1
Conservative gain from Labour		Swing		

Bolehall
Party	Candidate	Votes	%	±%
Labour	Peter Seekings	990	58.0	−3.3
Conservative	Andrew James	718	42.0	+3.3
Majority		272	16.0	−6.6
Turnout		1,708	31.5	−1.9
Labour hold		Swing		

Castle
Party	Candidate	Votes	%	±%
Conservative	Steven Claymore	917	47.6	−2.7
Labour	Marion Couchman	736	38.2	+0.7
Liberal Democrats	Jenny Pinkett	273	14.2	+2.0
Majority		181	9.4	−3.4
Turnout		1,926	34.5	−1.2
Conservative gain from Labour		Swing		

Glascote
Party	Candidate	Votes	%	±%
Independent	Chris Cooke	587	40.9	+40.9
Labour	Sheree Peaple	467	32.5	−21.1
Conservative	Debbie James	381	26.6	−19.8
Majority		120	8.4	
Turnout		1,435	25.6	+1.7
Independent hold		Swing		

Mercian
Party	Candidate	Votes	%	±%
Conservative	Martyn Price	729	36.5	−5.5
Labour	Neil Fuller	579	29.0	−4.8
Independent	Richard Kingstone	444	22.3	+22.3
Liberal Democrats	Geoff Blake	243	12.2	−12.0
Majority		150	7.5	−0.7
Turnout		1,995	38.0	+1.0
Conservative gain from Labour		Swing		

Spital
Party	Candidate	Votes	%	±%
Conservative	Maureen Gant	1,122	52.9	+2.2
Labour	Karen Hirons	682	32.2	−0.8
Liberal Democrats	Jenny Blake	315	14.9	−1.4
Majority		440	20.7	+3.0
Turnout		2,119	38.5	−1.0
Conservative hold		Swing		

Stonydelph
Party	Candidate	Votes	%	±%
Conservative	Ben Price	606	38.6	−18.1
Labour	Margaret Clarke	570	36.3	−7.0
BNP	Lynn Smith	395	25.1	+25.1
Majority		36	2.3	−11.1
Turnout		1,571	27.4	+2.4
Conservative hold		Swing		

Trinity
Party	Candidate	Votes	%	±%
Conservative	Jeremy Oates	1,086	54.2	−0.2
Labour	David Foster	638	31.9	+1.8
Liberal Democrats	Roger Jones	278	13.9	−1.6
Majority		448	22.3	−2.0
Turnout		2,002	34.0	−0.8
Conservative hold		Swing		

Wilnecote
Party	Candidate	Votes	%	±%
Conservative	Brian Beale	1,007	53.7	−2.9
Labour	Ken Lewis	868	46.3	+2.9
Majority		139	7.4	−5.8
Turnout		1,875	29.0	−2.4
Conservative hold		Swing		
