= 2010 Tamworth Borough Council election =

2010 English local election

Results of the 2010 Tamworth Borough Council election

The 2010 Tamworth Borough Council election was held on 5 May 2010 alongside other local elections to elect members of the Tamworth Borough Council. Ten seats were up for election (one third); the Conservative Party increased their majority on the council. In the general election, the Conservatives also gained the Tamworth constituency from the Labour Party.

== Results ==
Results
Party	2009	Change	2010
Conservative Party	24	▲1	25
Labour Party	5	▼1	4
Others	1	Steady	1
