= 2022 Tamworth Borough Council election =

2022 UK local government election

Results by ward

The 2022 Tamworth Borough Council election took place on 5 May 2022 to elect members of Tamworth Borough Council in England. This was on the same day as other local elections.

== Results summary ==
2022 Tamworth Borough Council election
Party	This election			Full council			This election		
Party	Seats	Net	Seats %	Other	Total	Total %	Votes	Votes %	+/−
Conservative	7	▼1	70.0	18	25	83.3	7,945	47.5	-9.4
Labour	2	Steady	20.0	1	3	10.0	6,743	40.3	+11.6
Independent	1	▲1	10.0	0	1	3.3	1,789	10.7	+2.7
UKIP	0	Steady	0.0	1	1	3.3	N/A	N/A	-4.4
Green	0	Steady	0.0	0	0	0.0	263	1.6	-0.4

== Ward results ==
=== Amington ===
Amington
Party	Candidate	Votes	%	±%
Conservative	Rosey Claymore	940	54.4	−6.0
Labour	Carol Dean	788	45.6	+15.3
Majority		152	8.8	
Turnout		1,767	27.2	
Conservative hold		Swing	▼10.7	

=== Belgrave ===
Belgrave
Party	Candidate	Votes	%	±%
Conservative	Thomas Jay	637	42.4	−18.5
Labour	Bob Bayley	538	35.8	+2.6
Independent	Pete Clay	237	15.8	N/A
Green	John Scattergood	92	6.1	N/A
Majority		99	6.6	
Turnout		1,513	26.6	
Conservative hold		Swing	▼10.6	

=== Bolehall ===
Bolehall
Party	Candidate	Votes	%	±%
Labour Co-op	Sarah Daniels	883	57.4	+21.4
Conservative	Michael Oates	654	42.6	−16.2
Majority		229	14.8	
Turnout		1,559	27.9	
Labour Co-op hold		Swing	▲18.8	

=== Castle ===
Castle
Party	Candidate	Votes	%	±%
Conservative	Ben Price	972	52.7	−4.4
Labour Co-op	Lee Wood	873	47.3	+17.5
Majority		99	5.4	
Turnout		1,869	30.2	
Conservative hold		Swing	▼11.0	

=== Glascote ===
Glascote
Party	Candidate	Votes	%	±%
Labour Co-op	Jan Wadrup	614	51.0	+25.9
Conservative	Brandon Mitchell	590	49.0	+0.2
Majority		24	2.0	
Turnout		1,233	22.8	
Labour Co-op hold		Swing	▲12.9	

=== Mercian ===
Mercian
Party	Candidate	Votes	%	±%
Independent	Richard Kingstone	998	53.1	+14.2
Conservative	Steven Pritchard	521	27.7	−11.4
Labour Co-op	Craig Adams	360	19.2	−0.6
Majority		477	25.4	
Turnout		1,887	34.8	
Independent gain from Conservative		Swing	▲12.8	

=== Spital ===
Spital
Party	Candidate	Votes	%	±%
Conservative	Samuel Smith	842	41.7	−13.6
Labour	Liam Bone	622	30.8	+5.7
Independent	William Bryan	554	27.5	N/A
Majority		220	10.9	
Turnout		2,026	32.6	
Conservative hold		Swing	▼9.7	

=== Stonydelph ===
Stonydelph
Party	Candidate	Votes	%	±%
Conservative	Paul Turner	704	50.4	−9.8
Labour Co-op	Chris Bain	522	37.4	+6.3
Green	Adam Bayliss	171	12.2	N/A
Majority		182	13.0	
Turnout		1,410	25.0	
Conservative hold		Swing	▼8.1	

=== Trinity ===
Trinity
Party	Candidate	Votes	%	±%
Conservative	Marie Bailey	1,130	64.3	−6.5
Labour	Denise Bayley	627	35.7	+10.7
Majority		503	28.6	
Turnout		1,781	31.3	
Conservative hold		Swing	▼8.6	

=== Wilnecote ===
Wilnecote
Party	Candidate	Votes	%	±%
Conservative	Tina Clements	955	51.0	−5.4
Labour	Dave Foster	916	49.0	+15.6
Majority		39	2.0	
Turnout		1,897	27.6	
Conservative hold		Swing	▼10.5	

== Changes 2022–2023 ==
In August 2022, six Conservative councillors left the party to sit as independents, being Michelle Cook (elected 2019), Danny Cook, Peter Thurgood and John Wade (all elected 2021), and Rosey Claymore and Ben Price (both elected 2022).

Belgrave by-election, 2 March 2023
Party	Candidate	Votes	%	±%
Conservative	Paul David Thompson	334		
Labour	Craig Lee Mark Adams	314		
Independent	Charlie Rose Taylor Castanheira (Charlie Taylor)	251		
Reform UK	Ian Stuart Cooper	40		
Green	Adam Christopher Bayliss	35		
Turnout		976	17.4	
Conservative hold				

By-election triggered by resignation of Conservative councillor Richard Ford.
