= 2011 Tamworth Borough Council election =

2011 UK local government election

Results of the 2011 Tamworth Borough Council election

The 2011 Tamworth Borough Council election was held on 5 May 2011 to elect members of the Tamworth Borough Council. Ten seats were up for election; the Conservative Party won 75% of them with 48.70% of the votes.

== Election result ==
Tamworth Borough Council election, 2011
Party	Seats	Gains	Losses	Net gain/loss	Seats %	Votes %	Votes	+/−
Conservative	7				70.00%	47.00%	10,375	
Green	0				0	1.40%	308	
Independent	1				10.00%	4.4%	947	
Labour	2				20.00%	43.40%	9,246	
Liberal Democrats	0				0%	3.31%	1,658	

== Ward results ==
Amington (1 councillor)
Party	Candidate	Votes	%	±%
Labour	Nigel Brindley	948	43.10%	
Conservative	Michelle Thurgood	1,254	56.90%	
Majority		1,254	56.90%	
Turnout		2,202	37.70%	
Conservative hold		Swing		

Belgrave (1 councillor)
Party	Candidate	Votes	%	±%
Labour	David Foster	994	51.70%	
Conservative	Martyn Price	930	48.30%	
Majority		994	51.70%	
Turnout		1,924	33.80%	
Labour hold		Swing		

Bolehall (1 councillor)
Party	Candidate	Votes	%	±%
Conservative	Warren Clegg	847	41.30%	
Labour	Peter Seekings	1,205	58.70%	
Majority		1,205	58.70%	
Turnout		2,052	35.50%	
Labour hold		Swing		

Castle (1 councillor)
Party	Candidate	Votes	%	±%
Conservative	Steven Claymore	1,078	48.60%	
Labour	Gary Hirons	958	43.20%	
Green	Simon Johnson	184	8.30%	
Majority		1,078	48.60%	
Turnout		2,220	39.20%	
Labour hold		Swing		

Glascote (1 councillor)
Party	Candidate	Votes	%	±%
Independent	Christopher Cook	702	40.00%	
Labour	Thomas Peaple	636	36.20%	
Conservative	Ben Price	419	23.80%	
Majority		702	40.00%	
Turnout		1,757	39.20%	
Independent hold		Swing		

Mercian (1 councillor)
Party	Candidate	Votes	%	±%
Labour	Marion Couchman	787	36.30%	
Green	Lisa Crane	124	5.70%	
Independent	Kenneth Forest	245	11.30%	
Conservative	Andrew James	1,015	46.80%	
Majority		1,015	46.80%	
Turnout		2,171	41.90%	
Conservative hold		Swing		

Spital (1 councillor)
Party	Candidate	Votes	%	±%
Conservative	Maureen Gant	1,255	53.40%	
Labour	Karen Hirons	874	37.20%	
Liberal Democrats	Jennifer Pinkett	221	9.40%	
Majority		1,015	46.80%	
Turnout		2,350	43.10%	
Conservative hold		Swing		

Stonydelph (1 councillor)
Party	Candidate	Votes	%	±%
Conservative	Stephen Doyle	897	50.70%	
Labour	Margaret Clarke	872	49.30%	
Majority		897	50.70%	
Turnout		1,769	30.80%	
Conservative hold		Swing		

Trinity (1 councillor)
Party	Candidate	Votes	%	±%
Labour	Gregory Clarke	802	34.10%	
Liberal Democrats	Roger Jones	221	9.40%	
Conservative	Jeremy Oates	1,326	56.40%	
Majority		1,326	56.40%	
Turnout		2,349	39.80%	
Conservative hold		Swing		

Wilnecote (1 councillor)
Party	Candidate	Votes	%	±%
Conservative	Brian Beale	1,354	54.10%	
Labour	Patrick Standen	1,150	45.90%	
Majority		1,354	54.10%	
Turnout		2,504	35.70%	
Conservative hold		Swing		
