= 2003 Tamworth Borough Council election =

2003 UK local government election

Results of the 2003 Tamworth Borough Council election

Elections to Tamworth Borough Council were held on 1 May 2003. One third of the council was up for election and the Labour Party stayed in overall control of the council. Overall turnout was 23.2%

After the election, the composition of the council was:

- Labour 18
- Conservative 11
- Independent 1

== Election result ==
Tamworth local election result 2003
Party	Seats	Gains	Losses	Net gain/loss	Seats %	Votes %	Votes	+/−
Conservative	5	3	0	+3	50.0	42.8	5,604	-0.6%
Labour	4	0	4	-4	40.0	42.0	5,497	-9.4%
Independent	1	1	0	+1	10.0	5.9	776	+4.3%
Liberal Democrats	0	0	0	0	0	9.3	1,214	+5.7%

== Ward results ==
Amington
Party	Candidate	Votes	%	±%
Conservative	John Wells	642	44.7	
Labour	Julie Holland	581	40.5	
Liberal Democrats	Zoe Blake	213	14.8	
Majority		61	4.2	
Turnout		1,436	23.8	+0.8
Conservative gain from Labour		Swing		

Belgrave
Party	Candidate	Votes	%	±%
Labour	Kenneth Lewis	468	44.9	
Conservative	Mary Oates	374	35.9	
Independent	Robert Taylor	200	19.2	
Majority		94	9.0	
Turnout		1,042	18.9	−2.1
Labour hold		Swing		

Bolehall
Party	Candidate	Votes	%	±%
Labour	Peter Seekings	714	56.0	
Conservative	Geoffrey Parsons	562	44.0	
Majority		152	12.0	
Turnout		1,276	23.7	−3.3
Labour hold		Swing		

Castle
Party	Candidate	Votes	%	±%
Labour	Ian Trenfield	639	45.5	
Conservative	Francis Worrall	538	38.3	
Liberal Democrats	Jennifer Pinkett	226	16.1	
Majority		101	7.2	
Turnout		1,403	25.5	−2.5
Labour hold		Swing		

Glascote
Party	Candidate	Votes	%	±%
Independent	Christopher Cooke	576	50.9	
Labour	Stephen Savage	370	32.7	
Conservative	James McKay	186	16.4	
Majority		206	18.2	
Turnout		1,132	19.7	−0.3
Independent gain from Labour		Swing		

Mercian
Party	Candidate	Votes	%	±%
Labour	Gerald Latham	636	41.2	
Conservative	James Ward	611	39.6	
Liberal Democrats	Geoffrey Blake	297	19.2	
Majority		25	1.6	
Turnout		1,544	28.9	−1.1
Labour hold		Swing		

Spital
Party	Candidate	Votes	%	±%
Conservative	Maureen Gant	900	52.7	
Labour	Derek Thompson	558	32.7	
Liberal Democrats	Jennifer Blake	251	14.7	
Majority		342	20.0	
Turnout		1,709	32.5	−5.5
Conservative hold		Swing		

Stonydelph
Party	Candidate	Votes	%	±%
Conservative	Kevin Taylor	432	52.1	
Labour	Brian Granger	397	47.9	
Majority		35	4.2	
Turnout		829	14.5	−2.5
Conservative gain from Labour		Swing		

Trinity
Party	Candidate	Votes	%	±%
Conservative	Jeremy Oates	749	49.0	
Labour	Patricia Dix	553	36.2	
Liberal Democrats	Roger Jones	227	14.8	
Majority		196	12.8	
Turnout		1,529	26.6	−3.4
Conservative hold		Swing		

Wilnecote
Party	Candidate	Votes	%	±%
Conservative	Brian Beale	610	51.2	
Labour	Alan Smith	581	48.8	
Majority		29	2.4	
Turnout		1,191	20.2	−4.8
Conservative gain from Labour		Swing		
