= Belgrave, Tamworth =

Area of Tamworth, Staffordshire, England

Coordinates: 52.61800°N 1.67360°W

Belgrave
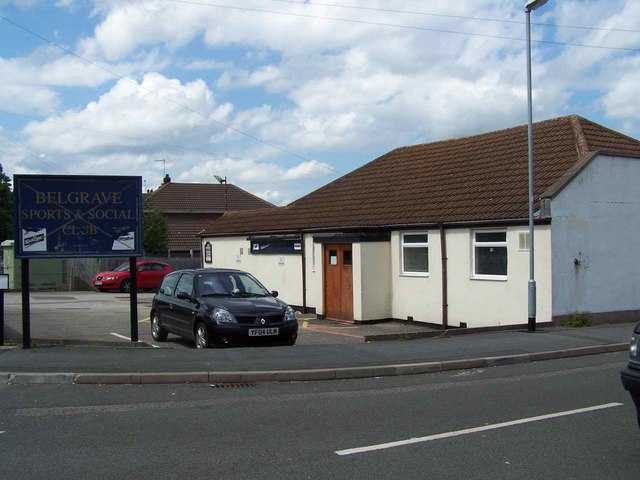
- Belgrave Sports & Social Club

- Location within Staffordshire
- Population: 7,664 (2011.Ward)
- District: Tamworth
- Shire county: Staffordshire
- Region: West Midlands
- Country: England
- Sovereign state: United Kingdom
- Post town: Tamworth
- Postcode district: B77
- Dialling code: 01827
- Police: Staffordshire
- Fire: Staffordshire
- Ambulance: West Midlands
- UK Parliament: Tamworth

Belgrave is an area of Tamworth, Staffordshire, roughly 1 1/2 miles (2.4 km) from the town centre. The main feature of Belgrave is Marlborough way which cuts the area in half. Belgrave contains Tamworth fire station, a Morrisons supermarket, a high school, three primary schools and is bordered by Two Gates, Wilnecote and Glascote.

== History ==
Starting life as a mining village, on previously agricultural land, Belgrave had its own colliery up until the late 19th century. Other former local industries were terracotta works and motor manufacturing. The area was considerably expanded in the 1970s with the addition of two new housing estates for the 'over-spill' population of Birmingham.

== Education ==
Belgrave contains Tamworth Enterprise College which is a state High School.

Belgrave also contains St Gabriels R C Primary School which is the state Roman Catholic primary school for Tamworth.

== Public services ==
Tamworth Community Fire station is in Belgrave. Completed in 2010, the station is state-of-the-art including several large meeting rooms, and a gym for use by partners of the station. The station is built on what was previously Belgrave High School field.

== Culture ==
Belgrave has a pub and a club. These are The Mercian at Exeley centre, and Belgrave Sports and Social Club which hosts regular bingo, private parties, and quality live acts from around the country. (Artists to have played there include Ruby Murray and The Drifters).

== Sport ==
Belgrave is home to Cottage Farm Juniors, who play at Tamworth Enterprise College. Belgrave SSC is the local men's football team, currently playing in the Tamworth & District Sunday Football League, in the Premier Division. The men's team plays their home games on a 4G pitch, newly built at Tamworth Enterprise College in 2020.

== Transport ==
Belgrave to the north is bordered by the A5 road to the north where there is a flyover junction. To the south is Watling Street which is the old A5 and is now designated as the B5404.

To the east of Belgrave is the Cross Country Route and there is a station at nearby Wilnecote.

== Media ==
Belgrave is covered by the Tamworth Herald newspaper which is the local newspaper for Tamworth.
