= Albert Christopher Addison =

English writer (1862–1935)

Albert Christopher Addison (22 April 1862 – 24 May 1935) was an English writer born in 1862 in Northallerton, Yorkshire. In 1868, his father Daniel Addison founded the Tamworth Herald newspaper.

== Prison sentence ==
In September 1896, Addison was sentenced to six months hard labour at the Old Bailey for forging and uttering an order for the payment of £2 5s., with intent to defraud. He was also charged with stealing two spirit levels and other articles of Henry Robert Bicknell, his master.

== Bibliography ==
Books

- The Story of the Birkenhead 1902 published by the Gresham Press Unwin Brothers Ltd 27 Pilgrim Street London E C.
- A Deathless Story of The Birkenhead and its heroes. A full account of the HMS Birkenhead (1845) disaster. Paternoster Row London: Hutchinson & Co. 1906. ISBN 9781843420576. "co-authored with W H Matthews"
- The Romantic Story of the Mayflower Pilgrims. Boston: L C Page. 1911. ISBN 9781331542643.
- The Romantic Story Of The Puritan Fathers And Their Founding Of New Boston And The Massachusetts Bay Colony. Boston: L C Page. ISBN 9781247064215.
- The Boston Guidebook 1923 published by Wing Boston Lincs.
- The Ancient Guildhall: Extract from the "Boston Guide Book" 1930 published by Wing Boston Lincs.
- Addison also wrote a book on the Lincolnshire Civil War Period but was never published due to the First World War.
