= 2026 Tamworth Borough Council election =

2026 English local government election

- 7 May 2026

10 out of 30 seats to Tamworth Borough Council 16 seats needed for a majority
	First party	Second party	Third party
Leader	Carol Dean		Jeremy Oates
Party	Labour	Reform	Conservative
Last election	18 seats, 49.1%	0 seats, 7.1%	8 seats, 34.3%
Seats before	15	1	4
Seats won	0	10	0
Seats after	14	11	3
Seat change	▼1	▲10	▼1
Popular vote	2,867	10,860	3,703
Percentage	13.6%	51.4%	17.5%
Swing	▼35.5%	▲44.3%	▼16.8%
	Fourth party	Fifth party
Leader		Paul Turner (Note: Leader of the Tamworth Independent Councillors Group.)/ Ben Price (Note: Leader of the Tamworth Independent Group.)
Party	Green	Independent
Last election	0 seats, 1.7%	4 seats, 3.6%
Seats before	1	8 (Note: Including the vacant seat in Mercian last held by an independent.) (Note: Of the 8 Independent councillors before the election, 5 sit in the Tamworth Independent group, 2 sat in the Independent Group, and 1 was non-aligned.)
Seats won	0	0
Seats after	1	0
Seat change	Steady	▼8
Popular vote	2,923	626
Percentage	13.8%	3.0%
Swing	▲12.1%	▼0.6%
- Winner of each seat at the 2026 Tamworth Borough Council election.
Leader before election
Carol Dean
Labour
No overall control (Note: Labour minority.)
Leader after election
Carol Dean
Labour
No overall control

The 2026 Tamworth Borough Council election was held on 7 May 2026, alongside the other local elections across the United Kingdom being held on the same day, to elect 10 of 30 members of Tamworth Borough Council in Staffordshire, England. Following the death of a candidate shortly before polling day, the vote in Wilnecote ward was postponed until 25 June.

After the previous election in 2024, Labour had held 18 seats, giving them an overall majority. Between the 2024 and 2026 elections, Labour lost three seats; two to defections and one at a by-election, such that immediately before this election they retained their de facto majority only by virtue of there being a vacant seat on the council, leaving Labour holding 15 of the 29 occupied seats. Reform UK won all ten seats contested at this election and became the second largest party on the council. Labour remained the largest party on the council, but were left two seats short of a majority. Labour formed a minority administration after the election.

== Summary ==
=== Background ===
In 2024, the Labour Party gained majority control of the council. In January 2026, the council asked for the election to be postponed pending local government reorganisation. However it was rescheduled on 16 February 2026.

On 21 April 2026, it was announced that the poll for Wilnecote ward would be postponed following the death of Sian Foster, the Labour candidate. The Wilnecote election was held on 25 June 2026.

=== Election result ===
2026 Tamworth Borough Council election
Party	This election				Full council			This election		
Party	Candidates	Seats	Net	Seats %	Other	Total	Total %	Votes	Votes %	+/−
Labour	10	0	▼1	0.0	14	14	48.3	2,867	13.6	–35.5
Reform	10	10	▲10	100.0	1	11	37.9	10,860	51.4	+44.3
Conservative	10	0	▼1	0.0	3	3	10.3	3,703	17.5	–16.8
Green	10	0	Steady	0.0	1	1	3.4	2,923	13.8	+12.1
Independent	3	0	▼8	0.0	0	0	0.0	626	3.0	–0.6
Liberal Democrats	1	0	Steady	0.0	0	0	0.0	101	0.5	–0.6
UKIP	1	0	Steady	0.0	0	0	0.0	40	0.2	–2.1

== Incumbents ==
Ward	Incumbent councillor	Party	Re-standing
Amington	Rosemary Claymore (Note: Originally elected as a Conservative, but left the party to sit as an independent.)	Independent	No
Belgrave	Thomas Jay	Independent	No
Bolehall	Sarah Daniels	Labour	Yes
Castle	Ben Price	Independent	No
Glascote	Janice Wadrup (Note: Originally elected as Labour, but left the party to sit as an independent.)	Independent	No
Mercian	Vacant	Independent (Note: Vacant seat last held by an independent.)	N/A
Spital	Samuel Smith (Note: Originally elected as a Conservative, but later left the party to sit as an independent, and subsequently joined Reform.)	Independent	Yes (Note: Standing as a candidate as Reform.)
Stonydelph	Paul Turner (Note: Originally elected as a Conservative, but later left the party to sit as an independent, and subsequently joined Reform.)	Independent	Yes (Note: Standing as a candidate as Reform.)
Trinity	Marie Bailey	Conservative	Yes
Wilnecote	Tina Clements	Independent	No

== Ward results ==
=== Amington ===
Amington
Party	Candidate	Votes	%	±%
Reform	Hayley Coles	1,402	53.2	N/A
Conservative	Donna Summers	482	18.3	–26.9
Labour	Stephen Standen	403	15.3	–38.2
Green	Matthias Osborne	347	13.2	N/A
Majority		920	34.9	N/A
Rejected ballots		13		
Turnout		2,646	38.2	+13.3
Registered electors		6,931		
Reform gain from Independent				

=== Belgrave ===
Belgrave
Party	Candidate	Votes	%	±%
Reform	Peter Utting	1,053	56.2	+42.6
Conservative	Dames Barron	256	13.7	–12.5
Green	Chelsie Hirons-Major	246	13.1	+7.4
Labour	Denise Bayley	217	11.6	–42.7
Liberal Democrats	Helen Miller-Viney	101	5.4	N/A
Majority		979	42.5	N/A
Rejected ballots		10		
Turnout		1,884	33.4	+9.7
Registered electors		5,645		
Reform gain from Independent		Swing	▲27.6	

=== Bolehall ===
Bolehall
Party	Candidate	Votes	%	±%
Reform	Dylan Powis	1,066	51.3	N/A
Labour Co-op	Sarah Daniels*	398	19.2	–52.3
Green	Dominic Perry	246	11.8	N/A
Conservative	Charlotte Barron	224	10.8	–16.4
Independent	Mark Hopkins	143	6.9	N/A
Majority		668	32.1	N/A
Rejected ballots		9		
Turnout		2,087	37.4	+13.9
Registered electors		5,584		
Reform gain from Labour				

=== Castle ===
Castle
Party	Candidate	Votes	%	±%
Reform	Allan Copsey	1,274	49.2	+36.4
Conservative	Chris Cooke	556	21.5	–11.1
Green	Adam Goodfellow	415	16.0	+9.5
Labour	Andrew Flint	342	13.2	–34.4
Majority		718	27.7	N/A
Rejected ballots		15		
Turnout		2,603	38.2	+10.1
Registered electors		6,818		
Reform gain from Independent		Swing	▲23.8	

=== Glascote ===
Glascote
Party	Candidate	Votes	%	±%
Reform	Mark Abley	1,014	59.0	N/A
Labour Co-op	Simon Peaple	251	14.6	–33.2
Conservative	James Nicholson-Roberts	227	13.2	–7.6
Green	Abi Moore	226	13.2	N/A
Majority		753	44.4	N/A
Rejected ballots		13		
Turnout		1,731	32.5	+10.3
Registered electors		5,330		
Reform gain from Independent				

=== Mercian ===
Mercian
Party	Candidate	Votes	%	±%
Reform	Nick Thompson	964	45.2	+33.5
Conservative	Gordon Moore	420	19.7	–14.0
Labour	Richard McDermid	280	13.1	–35.0
Green	Em Walker	276	12.9	N/A
Independent	Joe Postings	193	9.0	N/A
Majority		544	25.5	N/A
Rejected ballots		4		
Turnout		2,137	38.3	+9.8
Registered electors		5,579		
Reform gain from Independent		Swing	▲23.8	

=== Spital ===
Spital
Party	Candidate	Votes	%	±%
Reform	Samuel Smith*	1,107	44.6	N/A
Green	Stephen Andrews	550	22.2	N/A
Conservative	Brett Beetham	502	20.2	–17.8
Labour	Nash Kumar	324	13.0	–26.6
Majority		557	22.4	N/A
Rejected ballots		8		
Turnout		2,492	39.1	+7.8
Registered electors		6,377		
Reform gain from Independent				

=== Stonydelph ===
Stonydelph
Party	Candidate	Votes	%	±%
Reform	Paul Turner*	1,027	55.0	N/A
Conservative	Thomas Oates	329	17.6	–20.6
Green	Elliot Faraday	243	13.0	+7.9
Labour	Darryl Dean	228	12.2	–33.8
UKIP	Robert Blicliff	40	2.1	–7.8
Majority		698	37.4	N/A
Rejected ballots		3		
Turnout		1,870	34.0	+9.1
Registered electors		5,505		
Reform gain from Independent				

=== Trinity ===
Trinity
Party	Candidate	Votes	%	±%
Reform	Bernard Skeen	1,335	55.2	+38.4
Conservative	Marie Bailey*	545	22.5	–19.7
Labour	Alfie Green	272	11.3	–24.2
Green	Samson Lucas	265	11.0	N/A
Majority		790	32.7	N/A
Rejected ballots		12		
Turnout		2,429	42.1	+11.8
Registered electors		5,772		
Reform gain from Conservative		Swing	▲29.1	

=== Wilnecote ===
The election for this ward was delayed to 25 June due to the death of Sian Foster, the original Labour candidate.

Wilnecote
Party	Candidate	Votes	%	±%
Reform	Tracey Dougherty	618	46.4	+33.2
Independent	Tina Clements	290	21.8	N/A
Conservative	James Trafford	162	12.2	−19.9
Labour	Jenny Khalfan	152	11.4	−43.1
Green	Kyle Brown	109	8.2	N/A
Turnout		1,333	19.62	
Rejected ballots		2		
Registered electors		6,793		
Reform gain from Conservative		Swing		
