= 2000 Tamworth Borough Council election =

2000 UK local government election

Elections to Tamworth Borough Council were held on 4 May 2000. One third of the council was up for election and the Labour Party stayed in overall control of the council.

After the election, the composition of the council was:

- Labour 16
- Conservative 13
- Independent 1

== Election result ==
Tamworth local election result 2000
Party	Seats	Gains	Losses	Net gain/loss	Seats %	Votes %	Votes	+/−
Conservative	11			+11	91.7	53.3	8,052	+22.2
Labour	1			-11	8.3	36.9	5,579	-22.6
Liberal Democrats	0			0	0.0	9.9	1,490	+4.6

== Ward results ==
Amington
Party	Candidate	Votes	%	±%
Conservative	Evelyn Rowe	935	62.0	+19.4
Labour	Gary Ross	572	38.0	−19.4
Majority		363	24.0	
Turnout		1,507	23	+1

Belgrave (2)
Party	Candidate	Votes	%	±%
Conservative	Jeremy Oates	623		
Conservative	Wyonnie Elliott	583		
Labour	Carol Dean	418		
Labour	Michael Smith	410		
Turnout		2,034	19	−2

Bolehall
Party	Candidate	Votes	%	±%
Conservative	John Wells	665	53.4	+29.1
Labour	Kenneth Lewis	580	46.6	−29..1
Majority		85	6.8	
Turnout		1,245	23	−1

Castle
Party	Candidate	Votes	%	±%
Conservative	Alan Lees	708	38.7	+17.9
Labour	Marion Couchman	634	34.7	−33.3
Liberal Democrats	Jennifer Pinkett	486	26.6	+15.4
Majority		74	4.0	
Turnout		1,828	28	−1

Glascote (2)
Party	Candidate	Votes	%	±%
Conservative	Brian Beale	451		
Labour	Ronald Bribeck	359		
Labour	Dennis Powick	357		
Liberal Democrats	Andrew Lee-Brown	326		
Turnout		1,493	18	+0

Mercian
Party	Candidate	Votes	%	±%
Conservative	Geoffrey Parsons	782	52.0	+19.0
Labour	Derek Thompson	482	32.0	−22.6
Liberal Democrats	Geoffrey Blake	240	16.0	+3.7
Majority		300	20.0	
Turnout		1,504	30	−2.4

Spital
Party	Candidate	Votes	%	±%
Conservative	Kenneth Gant	1,168	64.3	+12.8
Labour	William Fuller	424	23.3	−17.3
Liberal Democrats	Jennifer Blake	225	12.4	+4.5
Majority		744	41.0	+30.1
Turnout		1,817	39	+0

Stonydelph
Party	Candidate	Votes	%	±%
Conservative	Gerald Pinner	530	61.8	+48.4
Labour	Stephen Savage	327	38.2	+0.3
Majority		203	23.6	
Turnout		857	15	−1

Trinity
Party	Candidate	Votes	%	±%
Conservative	Ian Cooper	935	58.7	+25.2
Labour	Robert Charles	444	27.9	−27.4
Liberal Democrats	Roger Jones	213	13.4	+2.1
Majority		491	30.8	
Turnout		1,592	30	+4

Wilnecote
Party	Candidate	Votes	%	±%
Conservative	Kathryn Cooper	672	54.0	
Labour	Mary Lewis	572	46.0	
Majority		100	8.0	
Turnout		1,244	21	−1
