= 2023 Tamworth Borough Council election =

2023 local election in Tamworth, England

- 4 May 2023

10 of the 30 seats on Tamworth Borough Council 15 seats needed for a majority

	First party	Second party
Leader	Jeremy Oates	Carol Dean
Party	Conservative	Labour
Seats before	19	3
Seats won	2	8
Seats after	14	10
Seat change	▼5	▲7
Popular vote	5,897	7,079
Percentage	36.6%	43.9%
Swing	▼5.9%	▲14.7%
	Third party	Fourth party
Leader	Daniel Cook
Party	Independent	UKIP
Seats before	7	1
Seats won	0	0
Seats after	6	0
Seat change	▼1	▼1
Popular vote	2,471	162
Percentage	15.3%	1.0%
Swing		▼21.5%
Leader before election
Jeremy Oates
Conservative
Leader after election
Paul Turner
Conservative
No overall control

The 2023 Tamworth Borough Council election took place on 4 May 2023 to elect 10 of the 30 councillors on Tamworth Borough Council in Staffordshire, England. This was on the same day as other local elections across England.

The council was under Conservative majority control prior to the election. They remained the largest party after the election but made a net loss of five seats, whilst Labour won most votes and took eight of the ten available seats. The council was left under no overall control after the election. The Conservatives chose a new group leader after the election, with Paul Turner replacing Jeremy Oates. Turner was formally appointed as leader of the council at the subsequent annual council meeting on 23 May 2023, leading a Conservative minority administration.

== Overall results ==
The overall results were:

2023 Tamworth Borough Council election
Party	This election			Full council			This election		
Party	Seats	Net	Seats %	Other	Total	Total %	Votes	Votes %	+/−
Labour	8		80.0	2	10	33.3	7,079	43.9	
Conservative	2		20.0	12	14	46.7	5,897	36.6	
Independent	0		0.0	6	6	20.0	2,471	15.3	
Liberal Democrats	0		0.0	0	0	0.0	227	1.4	
Green	0		0.0	0	0	0.0	212	1.3	
UKIP	0		0.0	0	0	0.0	162	1.0	
Reform	0		0.0	0	0	0.0	83	0.5	

== Ward results ==
The results for each ward were as follows, with an asterisk (*) indicating an incumbent councillor standing for re-election:

=== Amington ===
Amington
Party	Candidate	Votes	%	±%
Labour	Liam Bone	858	50.7	
Conservative	Donna Marie Summers	834	49.3	
Turnout			26.11	
Registered electors		6,554		
Labour gain from Conservative				

=== Belgrave ===
Belgrave
Party	Candidate	Votes	%	±%
Labour	Craig Lee Mark Adams	526	39.3	
Conservative	Simon Leslie Goodall*	388	29.0	
Independent	Charlie Rose Taylor Castanheira (Charlie Rose Taylor)	375	28.0	
Green	John Paul Scattergood	48	3.6	
Turnout			23.91	
Registered electors		5,604		
Labour gain from Conservative				

=== Bolehall ===
Bolehall
Party	Candidate	Votes	%	±%
Labour	Carol Ann Dean	882	60.0	
Conservative	Steven Andrew Pritchard	393	26.7	
Independent	Andrew Paul Jenkins (Andy Jenkins)	196	13.3	
Turnout			26.37	
Registered electors		5,598		
Labour hold				

=== Castle ===
Castle
Party	Candidate	Votes	%	±%
Labour	Lee David Wood	725	38.4	
Conservative	Alexander Charles Farrell* (Alex Farrell)	681	36.0	
Independent	Nicola Joy Claymore	311	16.5	
Green	Joell David Mayoh	90	4.8	
Reform	Ian Stuart Cooper	83	4.4	
Turnout			29.36	
Registered electors		6,450		
Labour gain from Conservative				

=== Glascote ===
Glascote
Party	Candidate	Votes	%	±%
Labour	Christopher David Bain (Chris Bain)	492	40.3	
Independent	Michelle Jane Cook*	390	31.9	
Conservative	Michael Anthony Oates (Mick Oates)	286	23.4	
Independent	Andrew James	53	4.3	
Turnout			22.72	
Registered electors		5,388		
Labour gain from UKIP				

Michelle Cook had been councillor for Amington ward before the election.

=== Mercian ===
Mercian
Party	Candidate	Votes	%	±%
Labour	Lee James Clarke	919	55.9	
Conservative	James Nicholson-Roberts	726	44.1	
Turnout			30.63	
Registered electors		5,416		
Labour gain from Conservative				

=== Spital ===
Spital
Party	Candidate	Votes	%	±%
Labour	Gareth Martin Coates	749	36.5	
Independent	William Edward Bryan (Bill Bryan)	663	32.3	
Conservative	Christian Christopher Cooke* (Chris Cooke)	642	31.3	
Turnout			32.3	
Registered electors		6,384		
Labour gain from Conservative				

=== Stonydelph ===
Stonydelph
Party	Candidate	Votes	%	±%
Conservative	Stephen Mark Doyle*	562	41.6	
Labour	Samantha Clarke (Sammy Clarke)	526	38.9	
Independent	Kayleigh Marie Price	104	7.7	
UKIP	Robert Bilcliff	85	6.3	
Green	Adam Christopher Bayliss	74	5.5	
Turnout			24.09	
Registered electors		5,634		
Conservative hold				

=== Trinity ===
Trinity
Party	Candidate	Votes	%	±%
Conservative	Jeremy Oates*	797	47.9	
Labour	Sheila Denise Bayley (Denise Bayley)	639	38.4	
Liberal Democrats	Helen Jane Miller-Viney	227	13.7	
Turnout			29.42	
Registered electors		5,690		
Conservative hold				

=== Wilnecote ===
Wilnecote
Party	Candidate	Votes	%	±%
Labour	Ben Thomas Clarke	763	42.2	
Conservative	Roy Rogers*	588	32.5	
Independent	Jason Peter Aston	379	21.0	
UKIP	Emma Louise Turner	77	4.3	
Turnout			26.43	
Registered electors		6,875		
Labour gain from Conservative				

== By-elections ==
=== Amington ===
Amington: 5 October 2023
Party	Candidate	Votes	%	±%
Labour	Lewis Smith	669	42.9	–7.8
Conservative	Donna Summers	526	33.7	–15.6
Independent	Michelle Cook	242	15.5	N/A
Reform	Ian Cooper	98	6.3	N/A
UKIP	Robert Bilcliff	25	1.6	N/A
Majority		143	9.2	+7.8
Turnout		1,565	23.8	
Registered electors		6,566		
Labour hold		Swing	▲3.9	

By-election triggered by resignation of Labour councillor Liam Bone.

=== Spital ===
Spital by-election: 5 March 2026
Party	Candidate	Votes	%	±%
Green	Stephen Andrews			
Conservative	Brett Beetham			
Labour	Steve Holland			
Reform	Wayne Luca			
