= Stonydelph =

Area of Tamworth, Staffordshire, England

Coordinates: 52.616°N 1.650°W

- Location within Staffordshire
- Population: 7,626 (2021)
- OS grid reference: SK238021
- District: Tamworth
- Shire county: Staffordshire
- Region: West Midlands
- Country: England
- Sovereign state: United Kingdom
- Post town: Tamworth
- Postcode district: B77
- Police: Staffordshire
- Fire: Staffordshire
- Ambulance: West Midlands
- UK Parliament: Tamworth

Stonydelph is a suburban neighbourhood and electoral ward about 2 miles (3 km) south east of the centre of Tamworth in Staffordshire, England. At the 2021 census, the population of the ward was 7,626.

A spelling of "Stoneydelph" is sometimes used but the Ordnance Survey map of 1888 shows "Stonydelph Farm" as the only building in this area. Much of the area is based around a road named "Pennine Way".

== Transport ==
As of 2026, there are three bus routes operating in the area, all operated by Arriva, those being 7, 7A and 7E. The nearest stations are Wilnecote railway station on the Cross Country Route, and Polesworth railway station on the Trent Valley line.

The main road through Stonydelph is the B5080 Pennine Way, which runs from a roundabout in the north down to a junction with the A5.

== Education ==
There are three schools in the area. Two primary schools, Three Peaks Primary Academy, located on Fossdale Road, and Stoneydelph Primary School, located on Crowden Road, and one nursery, Pennymoor Pre School Nursery, located on Pennymoor Road. The nearest secondary school is Two Rivers High School.

== Politics ==
Stonydelph ward elects three members to Tamworth Borough Council and one member to Staffordshire County Council. As of 2026, the borough councillors are Stephen Doyle (Conservative), Paul Turner (Independent) and Margaret Clarke (Labour & Co-operative Group).
