= Wilnecote =

Area of Tamworth, England

Coordinates: 52°36′29″N 1°40′04″W

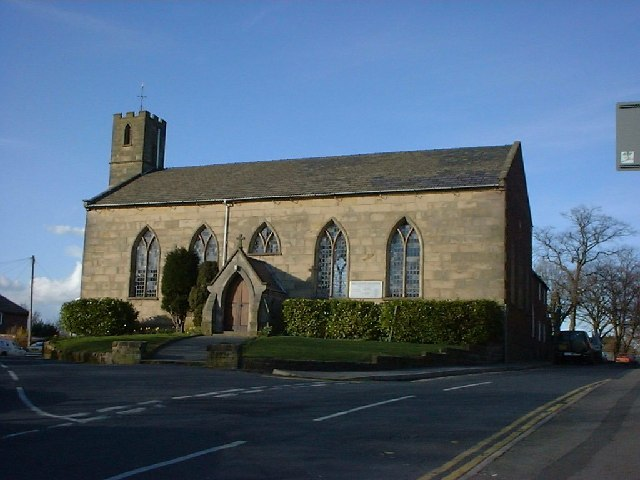

- Location within Staffordshire
- Population: 9,358 (Ward, 2011)
- OS grid reference: SK226012
- District: Tamworth
- Shire county: Staffordshire
- Region: West Midlands
- Country: England
- Sovereign state: United Kingdom
- Post town: Tamworth
- Postcode district: B77
- Dialling code: 01827
- Police: Staffordshire
- Fire: Staffordshire
- Ambulance: West Midlands
- UK Parliament: Tamworth

Wilnecote is a suburban area about two miles (3.2 km) south-east of Tamworth, in the Tamworth district, in the county of Staffordshire, England, however, it also lies within the historic county of Warwickshire. It lies between the River Tame to the west and Kettle Brook to the north and east. It is one of the largest communities in the town.

Wilnecote borders Hockley, Dosthill, Two Gates, Belgrave and Stonydelph.

== History ==
Wilnecote appears as Wilmundecote in Domesday Book, with eighteen households, and as Wylmyndecote in 1349. It is an old coal mining, lime-burning and brick-making area centred on an ancient village on Watling Street. Holy Trinity Church dates back to about 1250. It was completely rebuilt in 1821 as a simple Georgian chapel with a square bell tower which overlooks the Roman road Watling Street. The church design is unusual, as the entrance is halfway down the side of the building, as opposed to the end of the church. The stained glass windows in the west wall are by the renowned artist J. E. Nuttgens (1892 – 1982). The windows were installed in 1950 to mark the end of the Second World War, depicting the crucifixion (the death and sacrifice of war) and resurrection (the peace and victory). Stonydelph, which lies immediately north of Wilnecote, is a post World War II development.

== Civil parish ==
Wilnecote was formerly a township and chapelry, from 1866 Wilnecote was a civil parish in its own right, in 1894 the parish was abolished to form Wilnecote and Castle Liberty. In 1891 the parish had a population of 2351.

== Amenities ==
It has several public houses, including the Globe Inn, the Queen's Head which is a Grade II listed building dating from the 17th century, The Centurion (on the nearby Centurion Park industrial estate), the Prince of Wales, and the Overwoods Arms. A former public house, known as The Red Lion, was converted for residential use in 2018. Wilnecote is also home to a members-only club called Wilnecote Working Men's Club. Holy Trinity Church, Wilnecote sits on the highest point of the village. Schools in the area include The Wilnecote School.

The district is served by Wilnecote railway station with an hourly CrossCountry service between Birmingham New Street and Nottingham with most of the services going southbound to Cardiff Central.

== See also ==
- Listed buildings in Tamworth, Staffordshire

== Notes ==
Media related to Wilnecote at Wikimedia Commons
