= Tamworth Borough Council =

Local authority In England

Type
- Type: Non-metropolitan district

Leadership
- Mayor: Ken Norchi, Labour since 19 May 2026
- Leader: Carol Dean, Labour since 21 May 2024
- Chief Executive: Stephen Gabriel since 1 April 2024

Structure
- Seats: 30 councillors
- Graph of the party split among 30 seats.
- Political groups: Administration (13) Labour (13) Other parties (17) Reform (11) Conservative (3) Green (1) Independent (2)
- Length of term: 4 years

Elections
- Last election: 7 May 2026

Meeting place
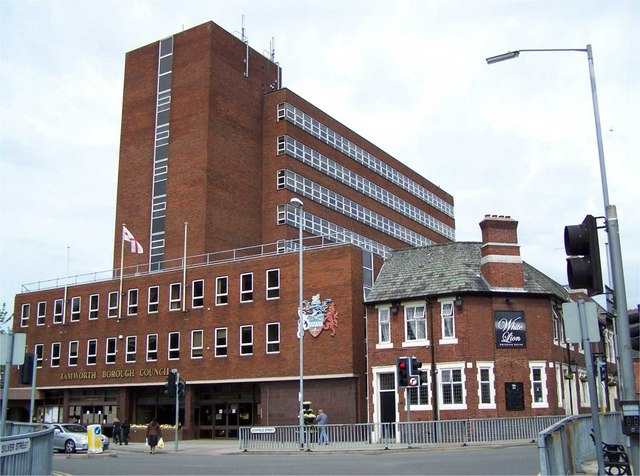
- Marmion House, Lichfield Street, Tamworth, B79 7BZ

Website
- www.tamworth.gov.uk

Tamworth Borough Council is the local authority for the borough of Tamworth in the county of Staffordshire, England. The council consists of 30 councillors, three for each of the 10 wards in the town. It is currently under no overall control, and has been led by Labour councillor Carol Dean since May 2024. The borough council is based at Marmion House.

== History ==
Tamworth was an ancient borough. It was reformed in 1836 under the Municipal Corporations Act 1835 to become a municipal borough. Until 1889 the borough straddled Warwickshire and Staffordshire. When elected county councils were established under the Local Government Act 1888 one provision of the act was that boroughs could no longer straddle county boundaries, as Tamworth did. The town was therefore placed entirely in Staffordshire, as that county had the larger share of the borough's population, with the new Staffordshire County Council providing higher-tier services. The borough boundaries were enlarged on multiple occasions, notably in 1932 and 1965.

On 1 April 1974 the borough became a non-metropolitan district, altering its powers and responsibilities but keeping the same area.

In 2026 the government announced that Tamworth Borough Council will be abolished in 2028 as part of upcoming structural changes to local government in England, with the area becoming part of a new South and Mid Staffordshire unitary authority. The outgoing council is considering proposing a town council for Tamworth.

== Governance ==
Tamworth Borough Council provides district-level services. County-level services are provided by Staffordshire County Council. There are no civil parishes in the borough, which is an unparished area.

=== Political control ===
The council came under Labour majority control in the 2024 election, they lost control in 2026.

Political control of the council since 1974 reforms took effect has been as follows:

Party in control	Years
Labour	1974–1976
No overall control	1976–1978
Conservative	1978–1980
Labour	1980–1983
Conservative	1983–1986
Labour	1986–1987
Conservative	1987–1988
No overall control	1988–1990
Labour	1990–2004
Conservative	2004–2023
No overall control	2023–2024
Labour	2024–2026
No overall control	2026–present

=== Leadership ===
The role of mayor is largely ceremonial in Tamworth. Political leadership is instead provided by the leader of the council. The leaders since 1980 have been:

Councillor	Party	From	To
Tony Comiskey	Labour	1980	1983
John Garner	Conservative	May 1983	May 1984
Irene Davies	Conservative	May 1984	May 1986
Phil Dix	Labour	May 1986	May 1987
Irene Davies	Conservative	May 1987	May 1988
Iain Marshall	Conservative	May 1988	Nov 1989
Phil Dix	Labour	Nov 1989	May 1995
Brian Jenkins	Labour	May 1995	Apr 1996
Stuart Tonks	Labour	May 1996	May 1999
Steve Holland	Labour	May 1999	2000
Peter Seekings	Labour	2000	2004
Ron Cook	Conservative	2004	2006
Jeremy Oates	Conservative	2006	May 2009
Bruce Boughton	Conservative	2009	Dec 2009
Danny Cook	Conservative	15 Dec 2009	23 Feb 2021
Jeremy Oates	Conservative	23 Feb 2021	May 2023
Paul Turner	Conservative	23 May 2023	20 Nov 2023
Thomas Jay	Conservative	12 Dec 2023	May 2024
Carol Dean	Labour	21 May 2024	

=== Composition ===
Following the 2026 election, and a subsequent change of allegiance, the composition of the council was:

Party	Councillors
Labour	13
Reform	10
Conservative	3
Green	2
Independent	2
Total	30

== Elections ==
Since the last boundary changes in 2002 the council has comprised 30 councillors representing 10 wards, with each ward electing three councillors. Elections are held three years out of every four, with a third of the council (one councillor for each ward) being elected each time for a four-year term of office. Staffordshire County Council elections are held in the fourth year of the cycle when there are no borough council elections.

== Premises ==
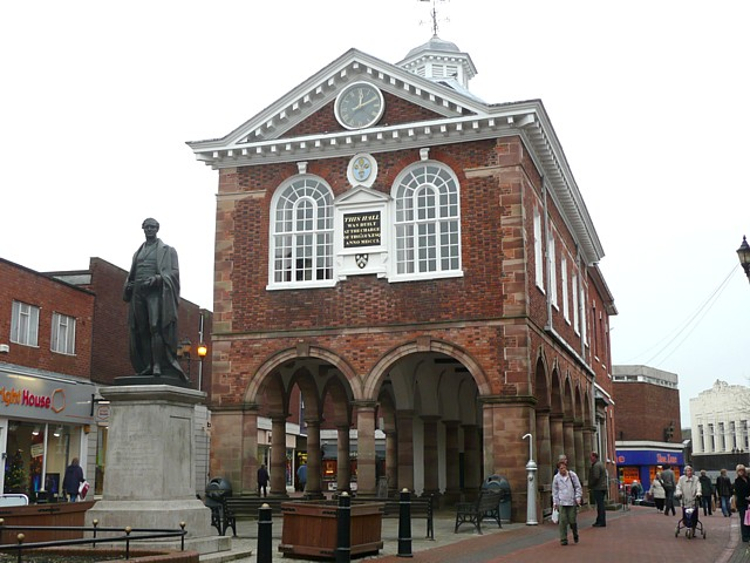
Tamworth Town Hall in Market Street

The council's main offices and usual meeting place are at Marmion House, a tower block on Lichfield Street which had been built in 1960 and was bought by the council in 1980, opening as its headquarters the following year. Some council and committee meetings are held at Tamworth Town Hall on Market Street in the centre of the town, which had been built in 1701. Prior to 1981 the council had met at the Town Hall and had its main offices at the White House at 21 Church Street, which had been purchased in 1888 after the council outgrew the limited office space at the Town Hall.

A council chamber was created at Marmion House and was the council's usual meeting place until 2022, when the council transferred most council and committee meetings back to Town Hall as part of plans to dispose of Marmion House. Most meetings returned to the council chamber at Marmion House following refurbishment in 2024.
