= Dymoke (disambiguation) =

Dymoke family of the Manor of Scrivelsby in the parish of Horncastle in Lincolnshire, holder of the feudal hereditary office of King's Champion with functions including to ride into Westminster Hall at the coronation banquet, and challenge all comers who might impugn the King's title.

Dymoke may also refer to:

- Dymoke White, 2nd Baronet (1888–1968), Conservative Party politician in England who served as Member of Parliament (MP) for Fareham in Hampshire from 1939 to 1950
- Charles Dymoke (died 1611), English politician and MP for Lincoln 1593.
- Henry Dymoke, 1st Baronet (1801–1865), British landowner and the hereditary King's Champion
- John Dymoke (1926-2015), hereditary Queen's Champion from 1946 until his death
- Margaret Dymoke (born c. 1500), lady-in-waiting at the court of Henry VIII of England
- Robert Dymoke (1531–1580), Queen's Champion of England and a devout Catholic recusant who was named a martyr after his death.
- Roger Dymoke (fl. 1395), English theologian and Dominican friar
