= Dymock (disambiguation) =

Dymock is a village and civil parish in the Forest of Dean district of Gloucestershire, England.

Dymock may also refer to:

- Alan Dymock (born 1987), Scottish rugby union journalist
- Anthony Dymock (born 1949), British admiral
- Geoff Dymock (born 1945), Australian cricketer
- Jim Dymock (born 1972), Australian rugby league coach
- Robert Dymoke or Dymock (1531-1580), Queen's Champion of England
- Roger Dymock (fl. 1370 – c. 1400), English theologian
- William Dymock (1861–1900), Australian bookseller and publisher
- Dymock Watson (1904-1988), British admiral
- William Dymock Pratt (1854-1916), English architect
- Dymocks, an Australian bookstore chain

== See also ==
- Dimock (disambiguation)
- Dimmock, a surname
- Dymock poets, a literary group of the early 20th century who lived near Dymock
