= Robert Dymoke =

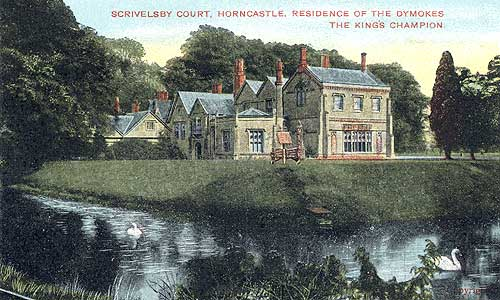
Scrivelsby Court

Robert Dymoke, Dymock or Dymocke, of Scrivelsby, Lincolnshire (born 1531; died at Lincoln, England, 11 September 1580) was Queen's Champion of England and a devout Catholic recusant who was named a martyr after his death.

== Life ==
In 1579 Dymoke received the Catholic priest, Richard Kirkman, at his manor of Scrivelsby, and maintained him as a schoolmaster to his sons. He was himself, at the time, an occasional conformist to the Anglican state religion. He was reconciled to the Catholic Church in 1580, either by Kirkman or by Edmund Campion.

In July 1580, Dymoke and his wife were indicted for hearing Mass and for recusancy. He was by then quite helpless owing to paralysis. Dymoke was ordered by Thomas Cooper, Bishop of Lincoln, to be carried off to gaol in Lincoln, where he was visited in his last hours by Protestant ministers, while he was dying there.

== Family ==
He was the son of Sir Edward Dymoke, of Scrivelsby, Lincolnshire (d. 1566), Hereditary King's Champion. The office ran in the Dymoke family, for many centuries.

His wife, whom he married sometime around 1556, Lady Bridget Clinton (born c. 1536), by whom he had ten children, was the eldest daughter and coheiress of Edward Clinton, 1st Earl of Lincoln and Elizabeth Blount.
