= The Banquet at the Coronation of George IV =

Painting by George Jones

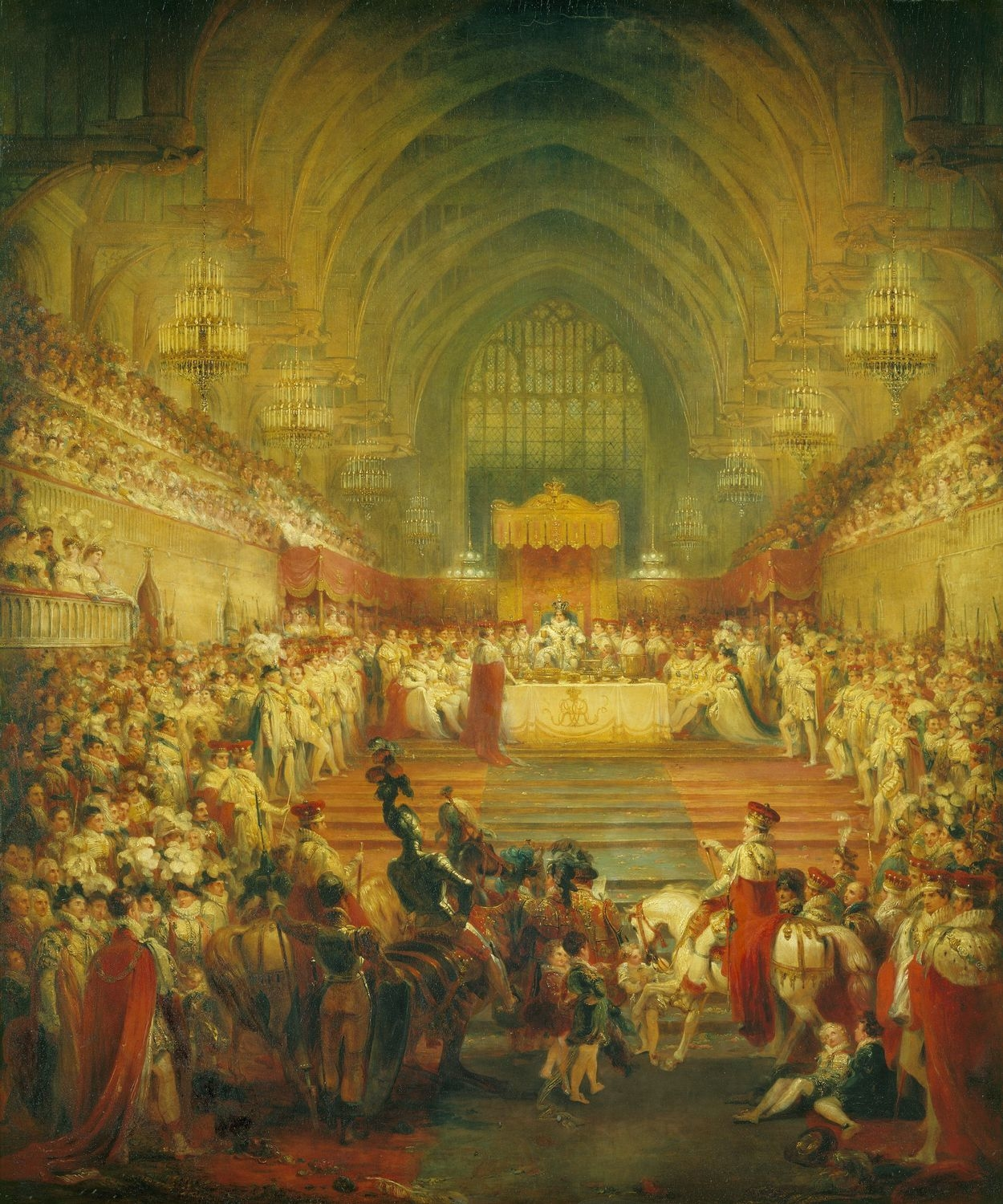
- Artist: George Jones
- Year: 1821–1822
- Type: Oil on canvas, history painting
- Dimensions: 109.8 cm × 90.1 cm (43.2 in × 35.5 in)
- Location: Royal Collection, London

The Banquet at the Coronation of George IV is a history painting by the English artist George Jones, from 1821–22.

== History and description ==
Completed in 1822, it depicts a scene from the Coronation of George IV on 19 July 1821. It depicts the banquet which took place in Westminster Hall following the ceremony, during which the traditional challenge was offered by the King's Champion.

Mounted in the foreground is the King's Champion Henry Dymoke dressed in armour accompanied by the Deputy Earl Marshal Lord Effingham and the Lord High Constable the Duke of Wellington. Seated on the throne and surrounded by members of the royal family is George IV who raises his glass in acknowledgement of his Champion. Standing in front of the table is the King's Carver William Feilding, 7th Earl of Denbigh. The lavish scale of the ceremony imitated that of Napoleon's 1804 Coronation in Paris.

The painting was commissioned by the Prime Minister Lord Liverpool, and marked a growing trend of commissioned artworks showing royal ceremonies during the nineteenth century. It was acquired for the Royal Collection by George V.

== Bibliography ==
- Alexander, Michael. Medievalism: The Middle Ages in Modern England. Yale University Press, 2007.
- Day, Ivan (ed.). Eat, Drink & be Merry: The British at Table, 1600–2000. P. Wilson, 2000.
- Lloyd, Christopher. The Royal Collection: A Thematic Exploration of the Paintings in the Collection of Her Majesty the Queen. Sinclair-Stevenson, 1992.

== See also ==
- The Coronation of Queen Victoria, an 1839 painting by George Hayter
