= Philip Marmion, 5th Baron Marmion of Tamworth =

Champion of Edward I

Sir Philip Marmion
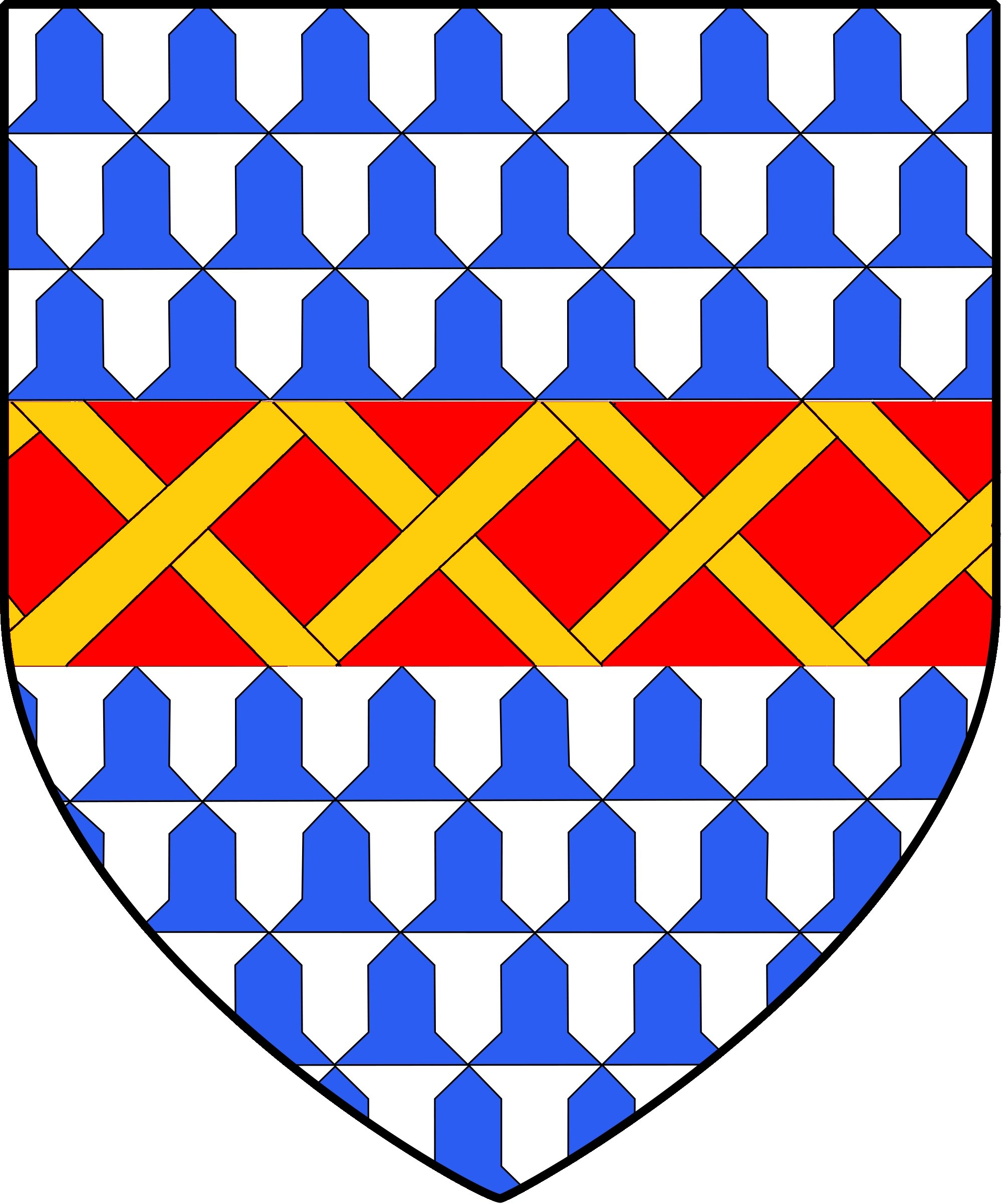
- Arms of Philip Marmion:- vair, a fess gules, fretty or

King's Champion
- In office 1241–1291
- Monarchs: Henry III, Edward I

High Sheriff of Warwickshire and Leicestershire
- In office 20 July 1249 – 1251
- Monarch: Henry III

Sheriff of Norfolk and Suffolk
- In office 9 July 1261 – 26 February 1262
- Monarch: Henry III

Sheriff of Nottinghamshire and Derbyshire
- In office 24 December 1263 – 1265?
- Monarch: Henry III

Personal details
- Died: 1291
- Spouse(s): 1. Joan de Kilpeck; 2. Mary (poss Cantilupe)
- Parent(s): Robert Marmion; Juliana de Vassy

Philip Marmion, 5th and last Baron Marmion of Tamworth (died 1291) was King's Champion and Sheriff. He was descended from the lords of Fontenay-le-Marmion in Normandy, who are said to have been hereditary champions of the Dukes of Normandy.

== Career ==
Philip was High Sheriff of Warwickshire and Leicestershire in 1249, and of Norfolk and Suffolk in 1261, having also been summoned to Parliament in that year.

He served in Poitou in 1254, and was imprisoned when on his way home through France at Pons.

Philip was one of the sureties for the king in December 1263 and was one of his leading supporters at the Battle of Northampton in April 1264. He was taken prisoner at the Battle of Lewes on 14 May 1264.

He died before 5 December 1291 when an Inquisition post mortem was held.

== Family and descendants ==
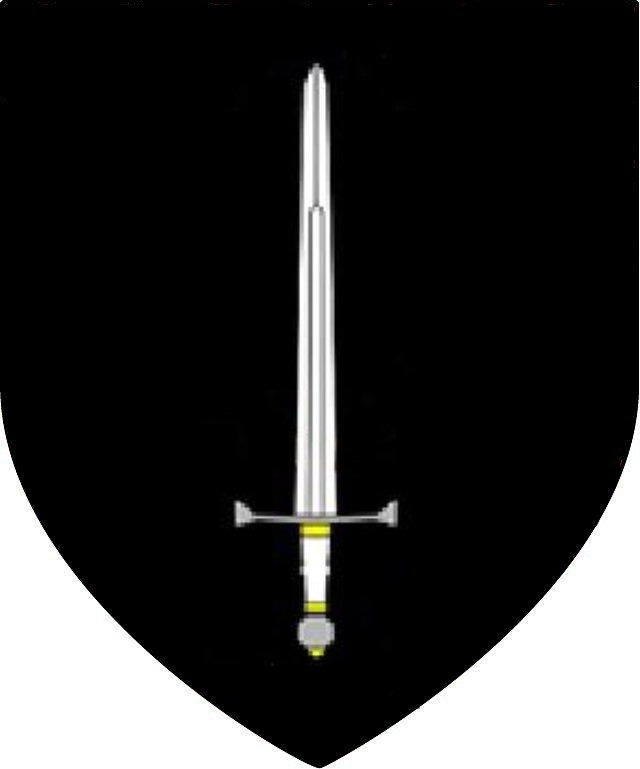
Modified Arms of Kilpeck borne by Sir Philip:- sable, a sword erect in pale, point in chief argent

Marmion first married Joan de Kilpec, daughter and heiress of Hugh (de la Mare) Kilpec, Baron of Kilpeck, by his wife Mazera, with whom he had the following issue:

- Mazera, m. Ralph de Cromwell and their daughter Joan (b.abt 1268) m. Alexander de Freville.
- Joan, (b.abt 1256) m. William de Morteyn but died with no issue.
- Maud, (b.abt 1262) m. Ralph le Botiller (Butler) of Wemme (son of Ralph Botiller and Maud Pantulph).

He married secondly, Mary (perhaps Cantilupe), (Inq P.M. 1315) who bore him:

- Joan, (b.abt 1284) m1. Thomas de Ludlow and, m2. Henry Hillary (-1349).

He also had a lovechild with a mistress whose identity is not known:-

- Robert, m. Isabel daughter and heir of Giles Fitz Ralph having a single daughter, Avice, m1. Eustace de Hardreshull and m2. John de Whitacre

Tamworth passed to Joan Cromwell, daughter of Mazera Marmion, and wife of Alexander de Freville, and Scrivelsby eventually passed with Margaret de Ludlow to Sir John Dymoke, in whose family it has since remained along with the title 'Champion of England'. Maud (Marmion) Butler was heiress of Pulverbatch, Middleton and Norbury.

== Notes ==
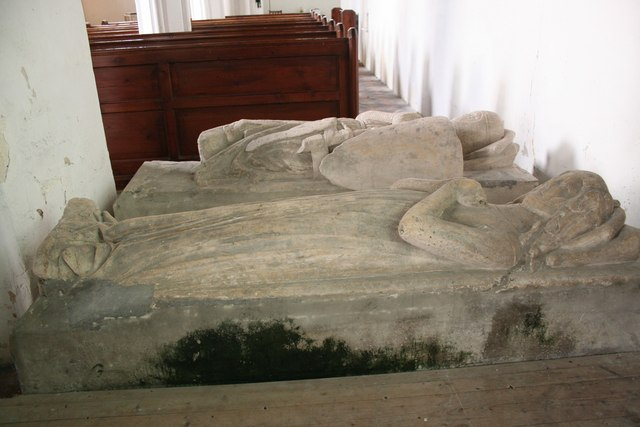
Philip and Lady Marmion's effigy in Scrivelsby church, Lincolnshire.
