= Standard Bearer of England =

The Standard Bearer of England was once an important office within the English army, especially during the times when Kings were still present on the battlefield. As standard-bearer Henry de Essex was greatly chastised when he threw down the English Standard and claimed his King (Stephen) was dead in 1153.

During the Wars of the Roses, each side had their own Standard Bearer, for example; Sir David Ap Mathew, standard bearer of Edward, Duke of York (later King Edward IV) at the Battle of Towton, and then William Brandon, standard bearer of Henry Tudor, Earl of Richmond (later King Henry VII) at the Battle of Bosworth. During the English Civil War, Charles II's standard bearer was not called Standard Bearer of England as he was only proclaimed king in 1660 long after the civil war had ended.

It increasingly became an honorific rank, and in modern times it has been linked with the King's Champion.

== Office holders ==
- Thomas de Sarsfield, premiere standard bearer Henry II, A.D. 1172
- Henry de Essex, Baron of Raleigh (until 1157. Forfeited 1163)
- Lord Simon de Manning (1160-1216). Said to have been the Royal Standard Bearer in 1190 during the Third Crusade under Richard I.
- Robert Trussebut
- Peter de Preaux (d.1212)
- Richard Fitzhugh
- Sir William Harrington (d. 1440). Bore the Royal Standard at Agincourt (1415).
- Sir Lewis Robessart (d. 1430)
- Sir William Burton, standard bearer to Henry VI in France (1421–29). Died at Battle of Towton in 1461.
- Sir David Mathew (1400–1484), Battle of Towton (from 1461 under King Edward IV). After the battle, King Edward IV granted the use of the word 'Towton' on the Mathew family crest for honoring Sir David Mathew with saving his life at the Battle of Towton. Sir David Mathew died in 1484, slain by the Tubervilles in an altercation at Neath.
- Sir Percival Thirlwall (d. 1485) According to some sources bore the standard of Richard III at the Battle of Bosworth, killed during the battle. Legend has it that, although Richard's group was failing, Sir Percival held the standard of his King aloft whilst fighting a desperate fight, continuing to do so even with the loss of his legs during combat; he is said to have held the standard until his last breath.
- Sir James Harrington of Hornby (d. 1485) According to some sources also bore the standard of Richard III at the Battle of Bosworth, killed during or shortly after the battle.
- Sir William Brandon (d. 1485) Bore the standard of Henry Tudor at the Battle of Bosworth, killed by Richard III during the Battle of Bosworth.
- Sir Anthony Browne (d. 1506)
- Sir Ralph Egerton (d. 1527) "for life with a salary of £100 per annum"
- Sir Anthony Browne (d. 1548) in 1547
- Anthony Browne, 1st Viscount Montagu in 1553
- Sir Edmund Verney standard bearer to Charles I
- Lieutenant-Colonel John Dymoke as hereditary Queen's Champion, Dymoke was present at the Coronation of Queen Elizabeth II in 1953 and acted as Standard-Bearer of the Union Flag.
- Philip (Edmond Charles) Chute (Chowte) of Appledore - Standard Bearer to King Henry VIII

== See also ==
- Royal standards of England
