= Dimock =

Dimock can refer to:

- Dimock, South Dakota
- Dimock Township, Pennsylvania
- Dimock, Pennsylvania
- Dimock (surname)

== See also ==
- Dimmock, a surname
- Dymock (disambiguation)
