= Coronation of George IV =

1821 coronation in the United Kingdom

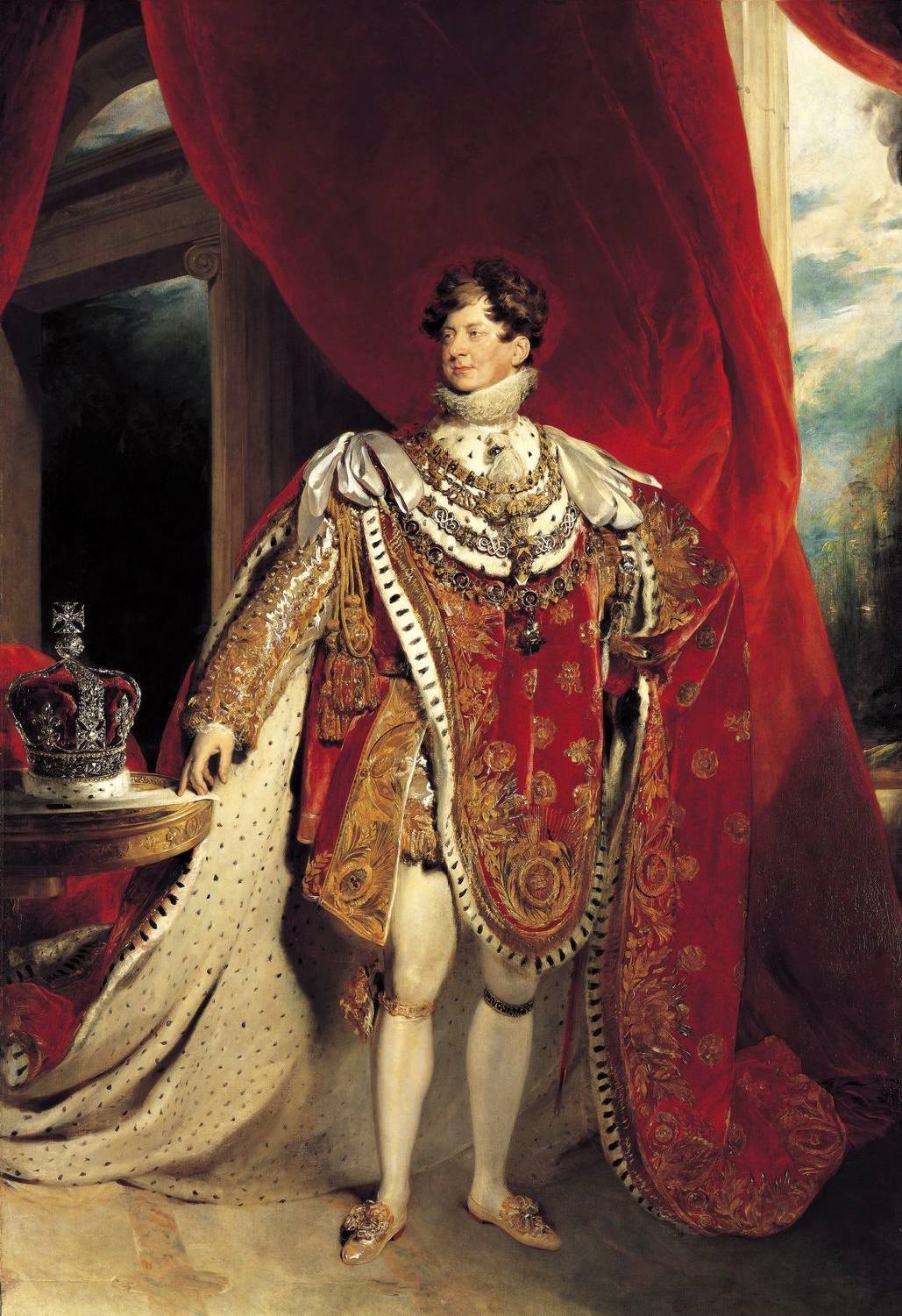
- King George IV in his coronation robes, by Sir Thomas Lawrence, 1821
- Date: 19 July 1821; 204 years ago
- Location: Westminster Abbey, London, England
- Budget: £238,000
- Participants: King George IV; Great Officers of State; Archbishops and Bishops Assistant of the Church of England; Garter Principal King of Arms; Peers of the Realm

The coronation of George IV as king of the United Kingdom took place at Westminster Abbey, London, on 19 July 1821. Originally scheduled for 1 August of the previous year, the ceremony had been postponed due to the parliamentary proceedings of George's estranged wife, Queen Caroline; because these failed to deprive Caroline of her titles and obtain a divorce from the King, she was excluded from the ceremony. In accordance with George's lavish personal tastes, the coronation was the most extravagant ever staged and a number of the traditional elements of the ceremonial were conducted for the last time.

== Background ==
George had acceded to the throne on 29 January 1820, on the death of his father, King George III, at Windsor Castle. The late king had been debilitated by illness for most of the previous decade and George had been appointed prince regent in his father's place in 1811. From the start of the Regency, Prince George, already notorious for his numerous mistresses and being an extravagant follower of fashion, declared that he would "quite eclipse Napoleon". Following Britain's victory in the Napoleonic Wars, George purported that he had played a leading role in the downfall of the French emperor. Therefore, the intention was that George would outshine the sumptuous coronation of Napoleon and a tailor was dispatched to Paris to study the emperor's coronation robe.

The ceremony was originally planned for 1 August 1820; however, on 5 June, George's estranged wife, Caroline of Brunswick, unexpectedly returned to England from the continent to claim her right to be crowned as queen. Despite long-standing rumours of Caroline's immoral lifestyle, she garnered considerable public sympathy, probably due to the King's unpopularity. She also gained the backing of Whig politicians, who formed the opposition to the Tory government, led by Lord Liverpool. At the urging of George, the government introduced a bill of pains and penalties into the House of Lords, "to deprive Her Majesty Caroline Amelia Elizabeth of the title, prerogatives, rights, Privileges, and Exemptions of Queen Consort of this Realm, and to dissolve the Marriage between His Majesty and the said Caroline Amelia Elizabeth" based on Caroline's alleged adultery. These proceedings, which took on something of the nature of a trial, would obviously take some time and so there was a postponement of the coronation until 19 July 1821. In the event, there was insufficient support for the bill which was abandoned in November, so Caroline was simply written-out of the coronation ceremony.

== Preparations ==
To fund the coronation, the King was able to secure £100,000 from government funds and the rest came from the huge war reparations of 100 million French francs which had been forced on France by the Treaty of Paris in 1815. Preparation and furnishing Westminster Abbey and Westminster Hall cost £16,819, £111,810 was spent on jewels and plate, £44,939 on uniforms, robes and costumes, and £25,184 on the banquet. The total cost of the coronation was £238,000, the most expensive ever and more than twenty times the cost of the previous event in 1761.

The organisation of the ceremonial was the responsibility of two of the Great Officers of State; the Lord Great Chamberlain, or in 1821, the Deputy, Lord Gwydyr, was responsible for events in Westminster Hall, while the Earl Marshal was in charge of the non-ecclesiastical proceedings in the abbey. However, since the holder of that hereditary post, the Duke of Norfolk was a Catholic and therefore excluded, he was obliged to appoint a Deputy, his Anglican brother, Lord Henry Howard-Molyneux-Howard, to fulfil his role.

Scaffolding was erected in the abbey to seat 4,656 guests, more than three times the number at the previous coronation. Because of the limited space in the old Palace of Westminster, the interior of Westminster Hall had been subdivided by wooden partitions to serve as courtrooms and these all had to be demolished to create the large space required for the coronation banquet, which required galleries for 2,934 spectators and 1,268 diners seated at 47 tables, some of which had to be sited in other parts of the palace. A temporary triumphal arch was erected at the north end of the hall in the style of a medieval castle.

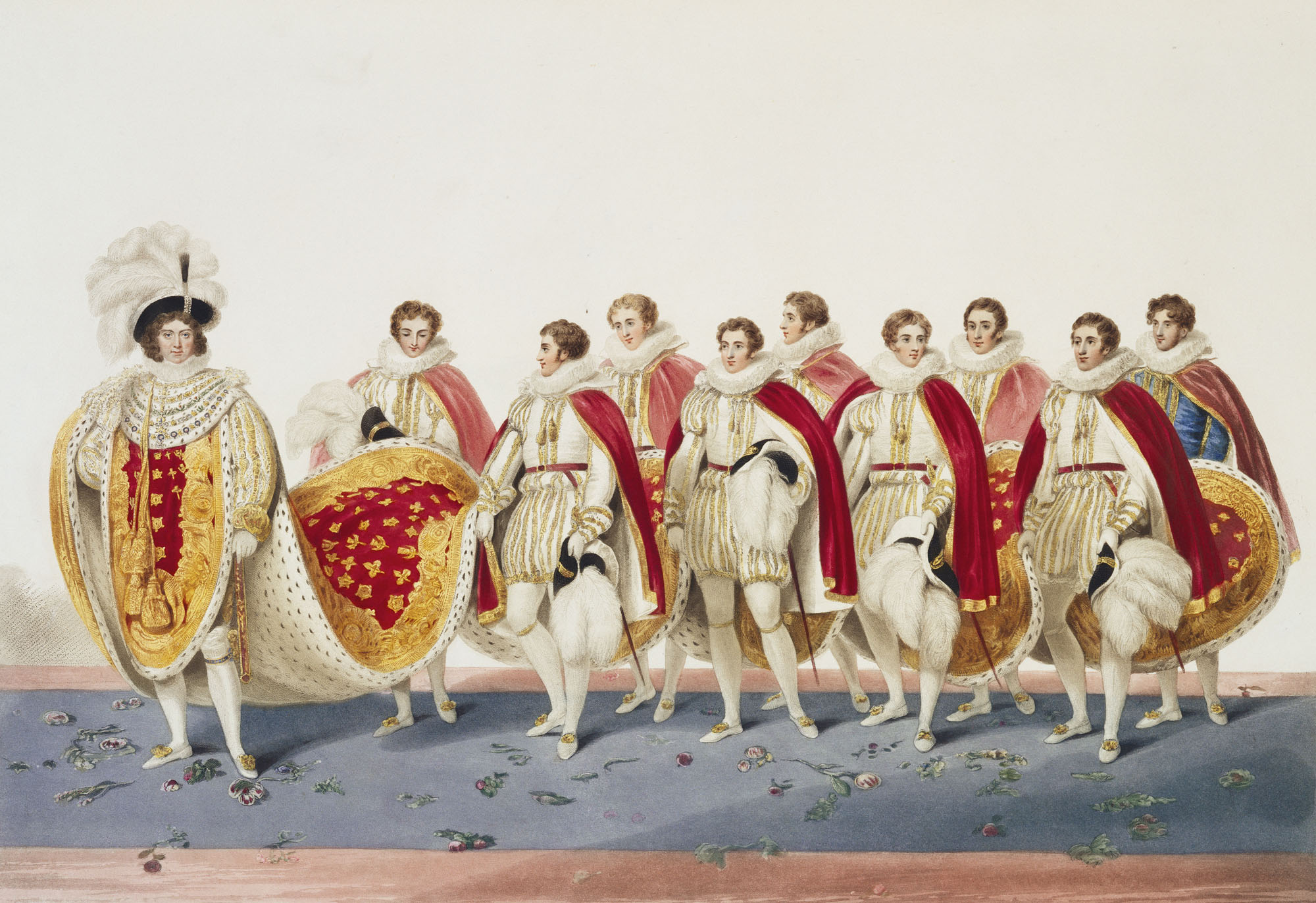
George IV with the train of his robe being carried by eight sons of peers and the Master of the Robes

In accordance with the vogue for Romanticism and with his own taste for flamboyant clothes, George insisted that the participants should dress in Tudor and Stuart period costumes. Peers were expected to provide their own clothing and a display of the required styles was staged at the College of Arms in June 1820 for the benefit of their lordships' tailors. The resulting outfits on the day, according to one report, "produced much amusement among the ladies"; but Sir Walter Scott enthused over the "gay and gorgeous and antique dress which floated before the eye". George's personal coronation outfit cost more than £24,000; his 27 feet (8.2 m) red velvet robe was afterwards sold to Madame Tussaud for display in her wax museum.

Although many of the Crown Jewels had been inherited from George's ancestors, he spared no expense in enhancing their magnificence. St Edward's Crown, dating from 1661, was actually only a frame, and most of the jewels had to be hired to be set in it; this cost £375,000 in 1821. The new Coronation Crown of George IV was commissioned at an estimated cost of over £50,000. A crown-like hatband for George's plumed hat, now known as the George IV State Diadem, cost £8,000, while coronets for the royal dukes cost £4,000 and for the princesses, £2,000 each. In contrast, coronets for the extended royal family were produced for £40 each at the next coronation.

== Exclusion of Caroline ==
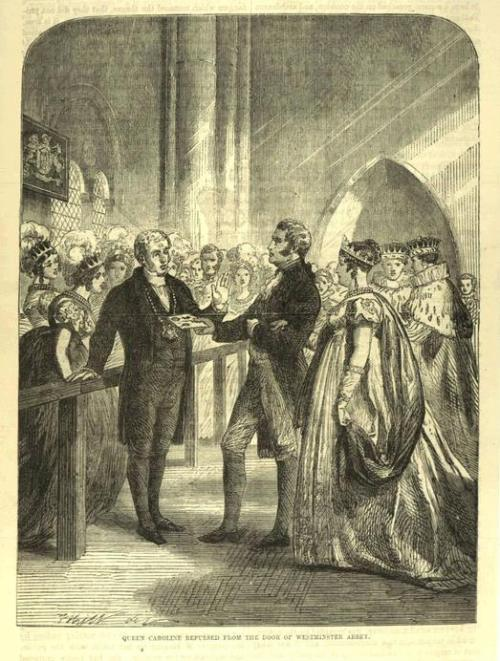
An artist's impression of Queen Caroline and Lord Hood being refused entry to the abbey by a doorman

On 16 July, the Queen's chamberlain, Lord Hood, had written to inform the Duke of Norfolk that the Queen would be attending the forthcoming coronation and requesting that she would be conducted to her seat. He received a prompt reply from Lord Howard, the Deputy Earl Marshal stating "that it was not His Majesty's pleasure to comply with the application". Despite this and the urging of her legal advisors, Queen Caroline was determined to attend the coronation. At 6 am, her carriage arrived at Westminster Hall and was received with applause from a sympathetic section of the crowd and "anxious agitation" by the soldiers and officials supervising the door, which after some confusion was closed. The Queen approached on the arm of Lord Hood, but was asked for her ticket by the commander of the guard. Replying that she was the Queen and needed no ticket, she was firmly turned away. When Caroline and Lord Hood tried to enter by a side door, it was slammed in their faces. Their attempt to find another entrance was blocked by a line of armed soldiers, so they then made for the House of Lords, which was connected to the hall, but when she was denied entry there too, the Queen returned to her carriage. After about 20 minutes the party arrived at the abbey, and approached the door which leads into Poets' Corner. Lord Hood addressed the doorkeeper, who was probably one of the professional boxers who had been hired for the event, announcing: "I present to you your queen, do you refuse her admission?" The doorkeeper replied that he could admit no one without a ticket. Lord Hood had his own ticket, but the doorkeeper was insistent that this would only allow one person entry and the Queen refused to enter alone. After further fruitless argument, the Queen's party retreated, the crowds shouting "Shame! Shame!" as she left in her carriage. Queen Caroline died two weeks later.

== Procession ==
The King arrived at Westminster by carriage at 8:30 pm on the previous evening and spent the night in the house of the Speaker of the House of Commons. The carriages of the various participants started to arrive at 1 am and by 6 am the nearby streets had been brought to a standstill, so that many peers had to abandon their coaches and walk to the abbey through the crowds. At 10 am, following tradition, the ceremony started in Westminster Hall. The King, seated on a throne, was presented with the items of regalia by the clergy, which he then bestowed on various aristocrats who often had the hereditary right to carry them to the abbey. The procession on foot to the abbey was the only part of the proceedings which could be seen by the general public and large stands for spectators had been erected along the route, which passed out of the north door of the hall, across New Palace Yard, into Parliament Street, Bridge Street and King Street to the west door of the abbey. It was a raised and carpeted walkway 15 feet (4.6 m) wide and 3 feet (0.91 m) high with a handrail and was lined by soldiers. There were some 700 people in the procession, headed by the King's Royal Herbstrewer and six maids, scattering petals on the carpet. Included in this number was a military band and the choir who repeatedly sang the anthem O Lord, grant the King a long life by William Child, interspersed with drumming and trumpet fanfares.

== Service ==
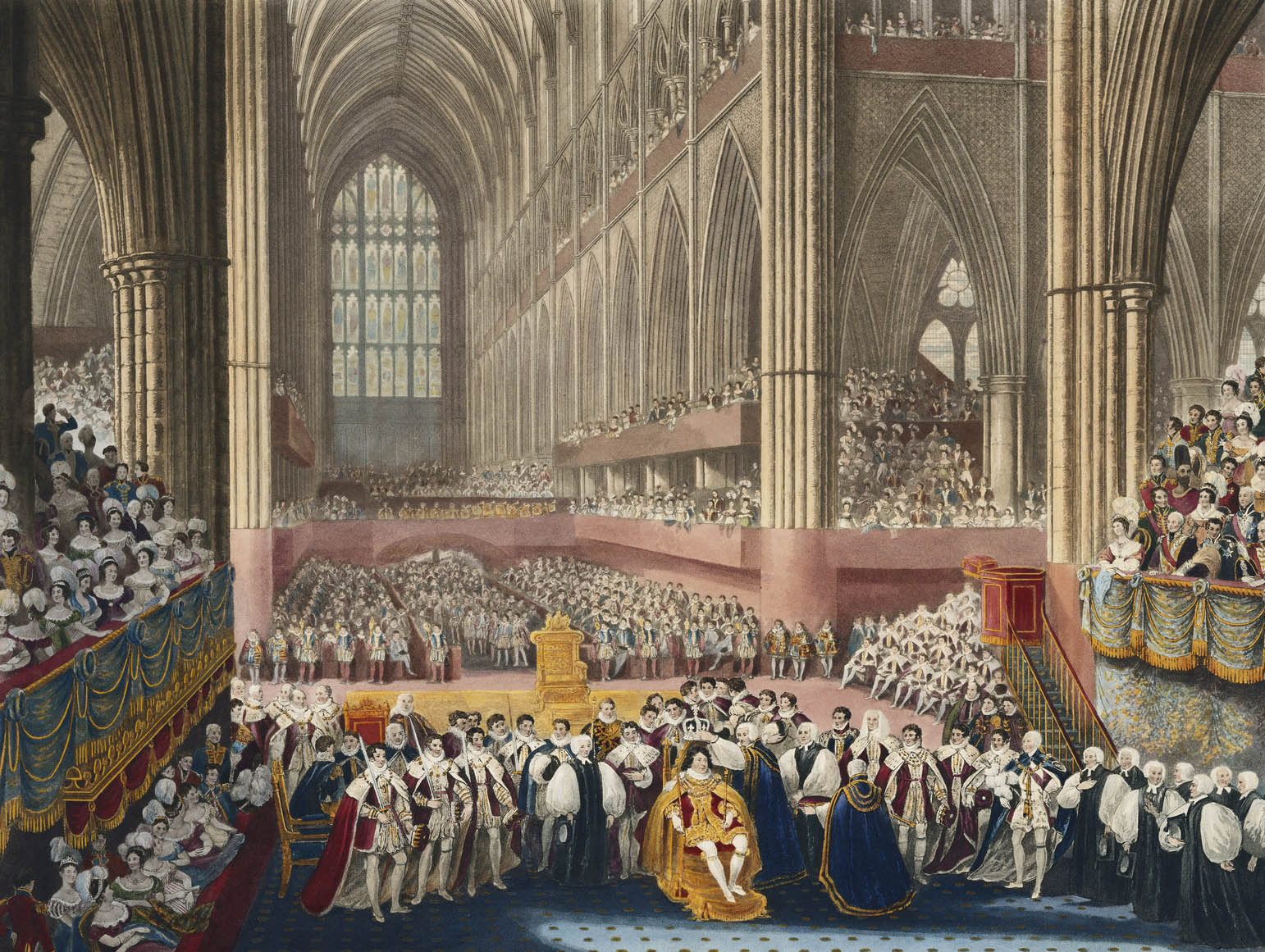
The moment of George's crowning at Westminster Abbey

The content of the coronation service was the responsibility of the Archbishop of Canterbury, Charles Manners-Sutton, who had only made minor modifications to the text used at the previous coronation, especially excluding any reference to the Queen. As at the previous event, printed cards showing the order of service were issued to the participants; this was particularly helpful when the manuscript text of the coronation oath was mislaid and George simply signed the card instead. The wording of the oath itself had been amended from "the people of this kingdom of Great Britain" to "this United Kingdom of Great Britain and Ireland" to reflect the Acts of Union 1800. The sermon was preached by the Archbishop of York, Edward Venables-Vernon-Harcourt, on a text taken from the Book of Samuel; "he that ruleth over men must be just, ruling in the fear of God".

It was a warm day and the King, encumbered by the weight of his lavish costume, was seen to be perspiring heavily throughout the service and later remarked; "I would not endure again the sufferings of that day for another kingdom!" At the end of the ceremony, the recessional was marred by the premature departure of the choir, so that the King had to pass empty benches covered in litter, described in the press as "a most unpicturesque arrangement".

=== Music ===
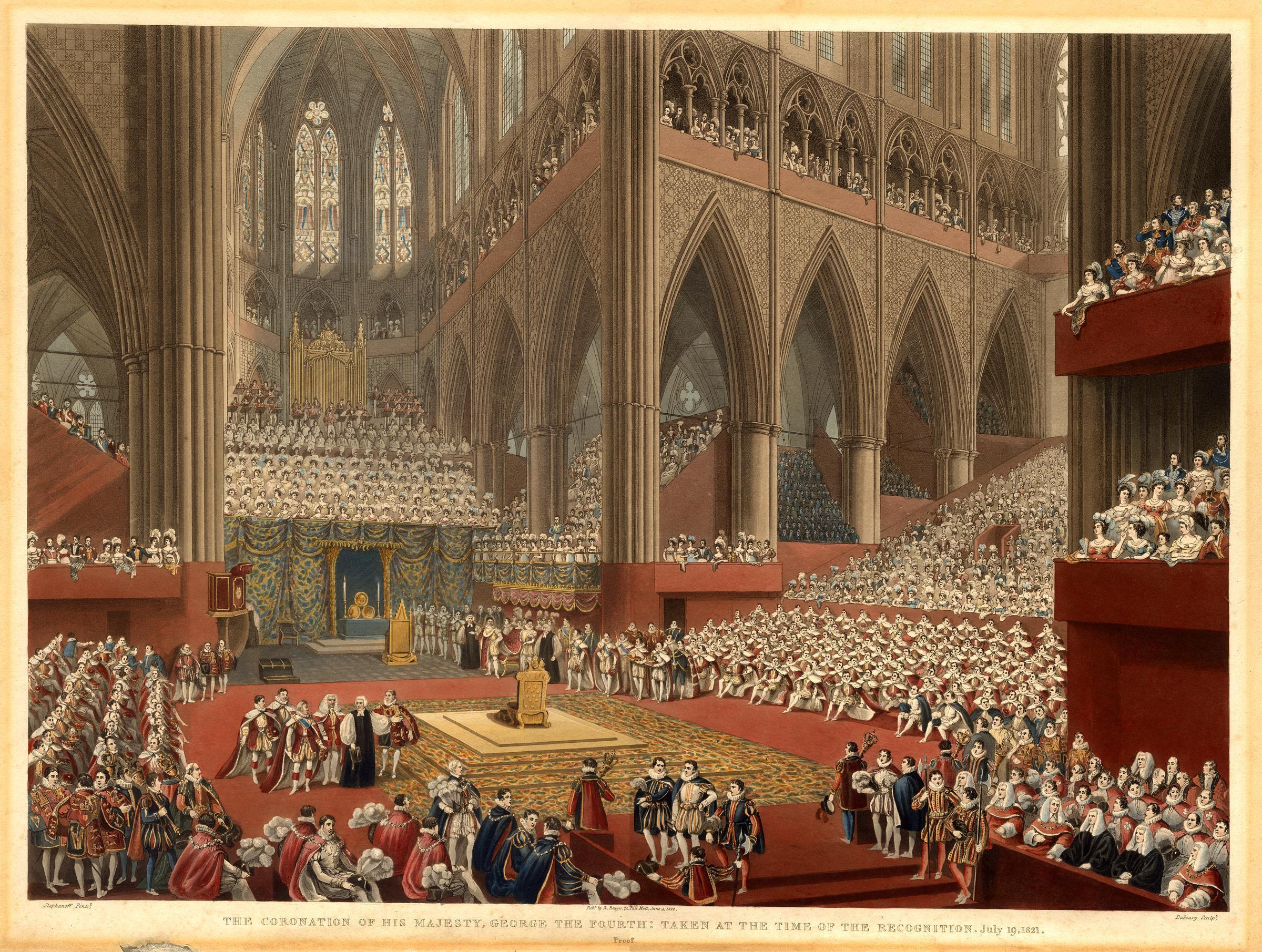
A view of the coronation "theatre", showing the gallery for the large choir and orchestra (centre left) which spanned the eastern end of the abbey.

The music used in the coronation service seems to have been influenced by George's wishes; some of it was changed by the King when he attended the final rehearsal only three days before the event. By tradition, the monarch's entry into the abbey is greeted by the anthem I was glad; however, this was deferred until the King had reached the quire and was sung to a new setting by Thomas Attwood. Instead, at the initial entry of the King, the Hallelujah Chorus from the oratorio Messiah by George Frideric Handel was sung. At that point, the King's Scholars of Westminster School shouted the traditional acclamation, "Vivat Georgius Rex!". This was followed by music from another Handel oratorio, Saul, in which the libretto of the aria Already see the daughters of the land advance was amended, apparently at George's suggestion, to say Already see the monarch of the Lord advance; the piece finished with the chorus Welcome, welcome, mighty king! Other choral music included another anthem by Attwood, Let thy hand be strengthened, Zadok the Priest by Handel (uniquely, in an arrangement by Johann Baptist Cramer), The King shall rejoice by William Knyvett and a setting of the Te Deum by William Boyce. God Save the King seems to have been performed at least twice during the service; once by trumpets at the King's entrance and once shortly before the end by the choir with "all the nobles of the land, male and female".

The choirs and orchestra were placed in a large temporary gallery which spanned the east end of the abbey over St Edward's Chapel. One newspaper report stated that there were "a hundred instruments and twice a hundred voices". The only choirs officially mentioned are those of the abbey and the Chapel Royal but it is likely that the choir of St Paul's Cathedral was also present and that professional singers were hired-in. Large choirs of this size were fashionable at that time, especially for popular concerts of Handel's works. The conductor was William Shield and the organist was Charles Knyvett of the Chapel Royal.

== Banquet ==
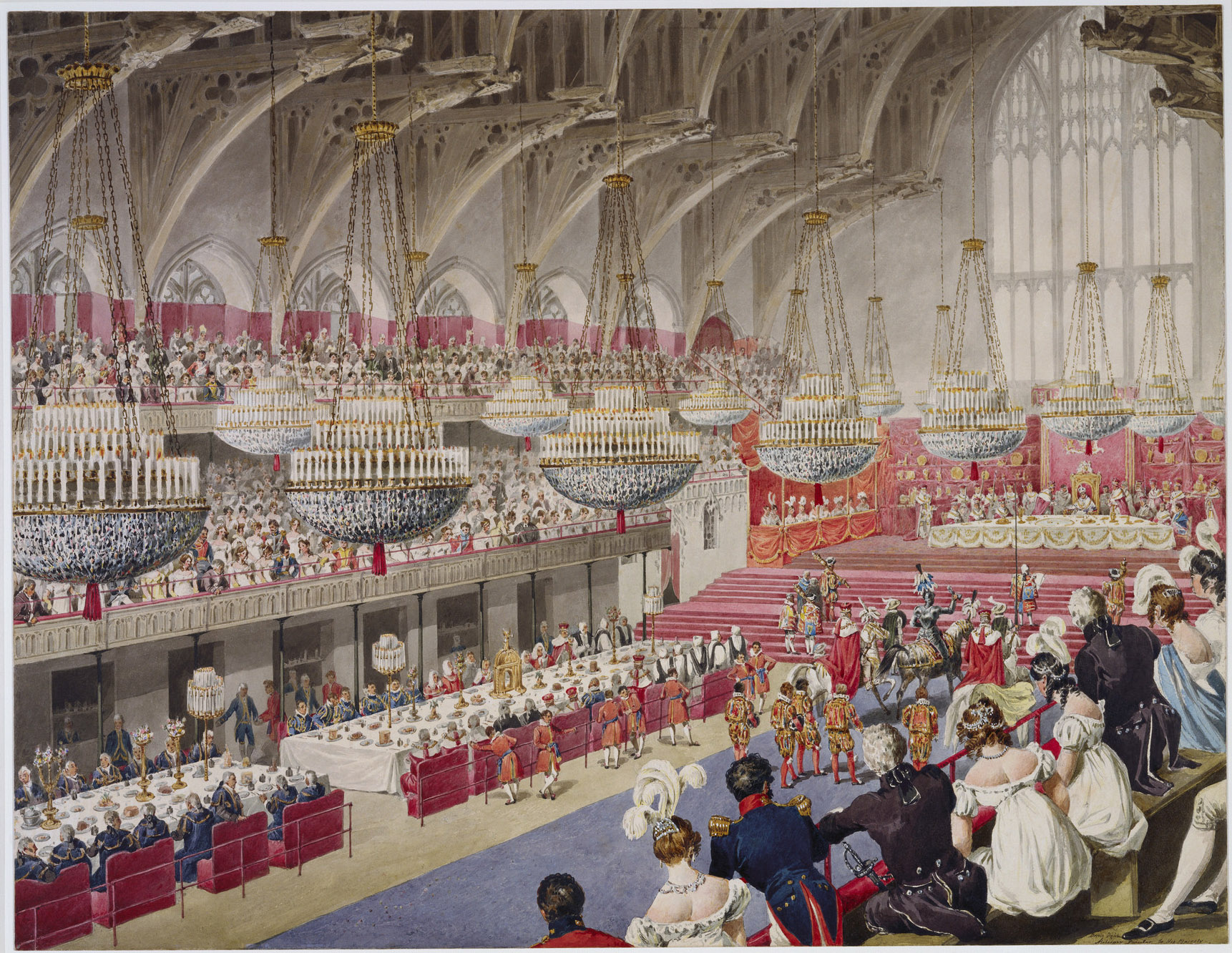
The King's Champion makes the third and last challenge before the royal table at the banquet

The coronation feast or banquet was first recorded at the coronation of Richard I in 1194, but that of 1821 was to be the last. The King returned to the hall in procession at about 3:30 pm. The spectacle was somewhat marred by the Barons of the Cinque Ports, who exercised their traditional right to carry a canopy over the King, supported on four staves. The King, perhaps wanting to be seen by the crowds looking down from windows and rooftops, decided to walk in front of the canopy; however, this caused the elderly barons to try to walk faster, but the swaying of the canopy alarmed the King who quickened his pace in turn, eventually resulting in "a somewhat unseemly jog trot" according to a press report. The King retired to a withdrawing room to rest until 6 pm when the feast commenced. The hall was lit by 2,000 candles in 26 vast chandeliers, but due to the heat of the day, the peers and peeresses below were continually being hit by large globules of melted wax.

The 23 temporary kitchens which had been built adjacent to the hall produced 160 tureens of soup and a similar number of hot fish and roast dishes, along with 3,271 cold dishes. The Deputy Earl Marshal, together with the Lord High Steward and Lord High Constable, supervised the proceedings on horseback, riding along the centre of the hall. An unfortunate incident occurred when the Lord High Steward, Henry Paget, 1st Marquess of Anglesey, was required to dismount and uncover the first dish on the royal table; he had lost his leg at the Battle of Waterloo and because he was wearing a prosthetic leg designed for riding, was unable to dismount without considerable difficulty and the assistance of several pages, which caused much amusement amongst the unsympathetic guests.

The highlight of the banquet was the arrival of the King's Champion, which had been a hereditary title held by the Dymoke family since the 14th century. Unfortunately, the holder of the post, the Reverend John Dymoke, was a clergyman and so the honour passed to his son, Henry Dymoke, who was only 20 years old and did not possess a suitable horse, so one had to be hired from Astley's Circus. Amid much ceremony, the champion in a full suit of armour rode in through the archway, flanked by the Lord High Steward and the Lord High Constable and riding the length of the hall, throwing down his gauntlet three times in the traditional challenge, the last time that this was enacted. During the toasts, the choir sang God Save the King again, joined enthusiastically by the diners and spectators who had risen to their feet. The choir then sang Non nobis Domine, perhaps because it appears in William Shakespeare's play Henry V after the Battle of Agincourt as an echo of George's perceived victory over Napoleon.

The King finally rose from his table at 8:20 pm and left for Carlton House by carriage. The spectators from the galleries were allowed down to the hall floor and proceeded to clear the tables, not only of leftover food, but they helped themselves to the cutlery, glasses, silver platters and table ornaments as well. Lord Gwydyr managed to prevent the priceless gold coronation plates from being carried off and armed soldiers arrived in time to prevent the kitchens being ransacked. The hall was not cleared until 3 am the next morning, when some who had fallen asleep on the floor had to be carried to their coaches.

== Public celebrations ==
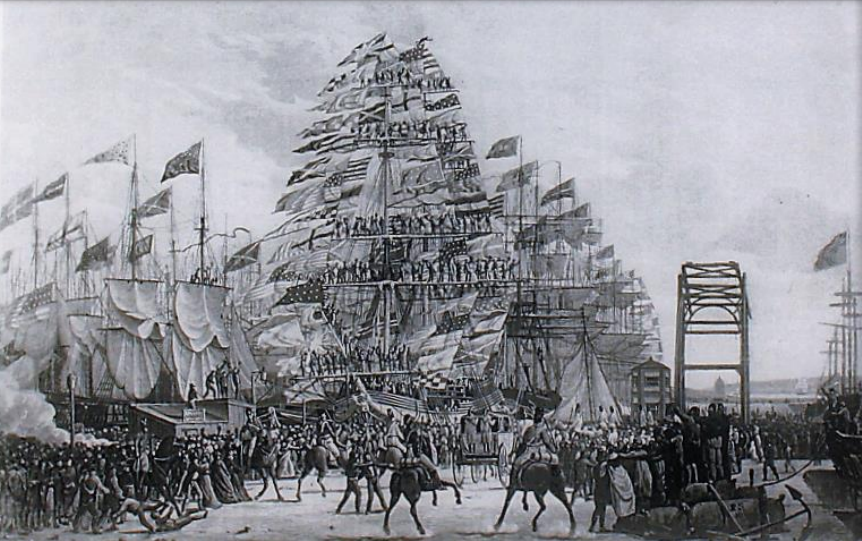
Opening of the Prince's Dock, Liverpool, on Coronation Day

As in previous coronations, there were some attempts to involve the wider public in the event. In London, a mob supporting Queen Caroline had rampaged through the West End breaking windows and had to be dispersed by the Household Cavalry. Elsewhere a better-natured crowd watched the ascent of a gas balloon from Green Park piloted by Charles Green, and then proceeded to Hyde Park where there was a boat race and in the evening, the trees and The Serpentine were illuminated with lanterns and a firework display was organised by Sir William Congreve, Contemporary writers describe "an immense concourse of persons" and "unexampled crowds", although a later account describes the display as being "very insignificant and did not attract much attention". All the theatres of London were open free of charge at the King's expense. Elsewhere, civic efforts at public celebrations were often marred by dislike of George and support for Caroline; in Bristol, a corporate pageant was watched by sullen crowds as it "passed through the streets with all the silent dullness of a funeral procession". In Liverpool, the corporation postponed the opening of Prince's Dock until coronation day, thereby successfully avoiding anti-monarchist demonstrations, while in Manchester, the crowds cheered for the King until the free beer ran out, when they began to sing "God save the Queen". Elsewhere, celebrations in towns and villages seem to have passed more harmoniously, often financed by wealthier citizens for the benefit of the poorer ones. In Brighton for example, there were "all sorts of manly exercises" and several oxen were roasted to feed 8,000 people.

== Royal guests ==
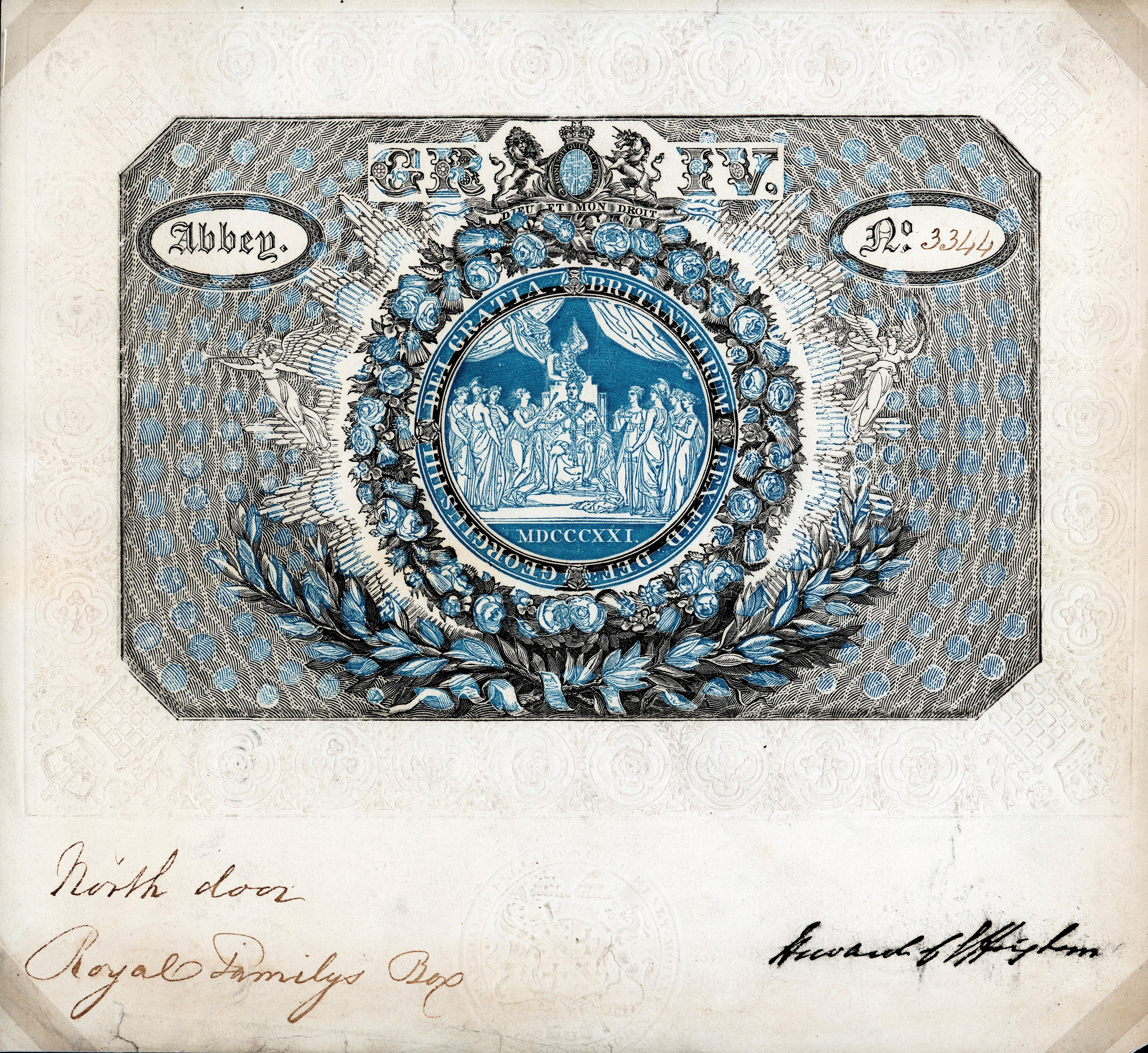
Admission card to the Royal Family's Box in Westminster Abbey, designed by Sir William Congreve

- The Duke of York and Albany, the King's brother
- The Duke of Clarence and St Andrews, the King's brother
- The Duke of Sussex, the King's brother
- The Duke of Cambridge, the King's brother
- The Duke of Gloucester and Edinburgh, the King's brother-in-law and first cousin
- Prince Leopold of Saxe-Coburg-Saalfeld, the King's son-in-law (brother of the Duke of Saxe-Coburg-Saalfeld)
