= Sir David Mathew =

Welsh knight (1400–1484)

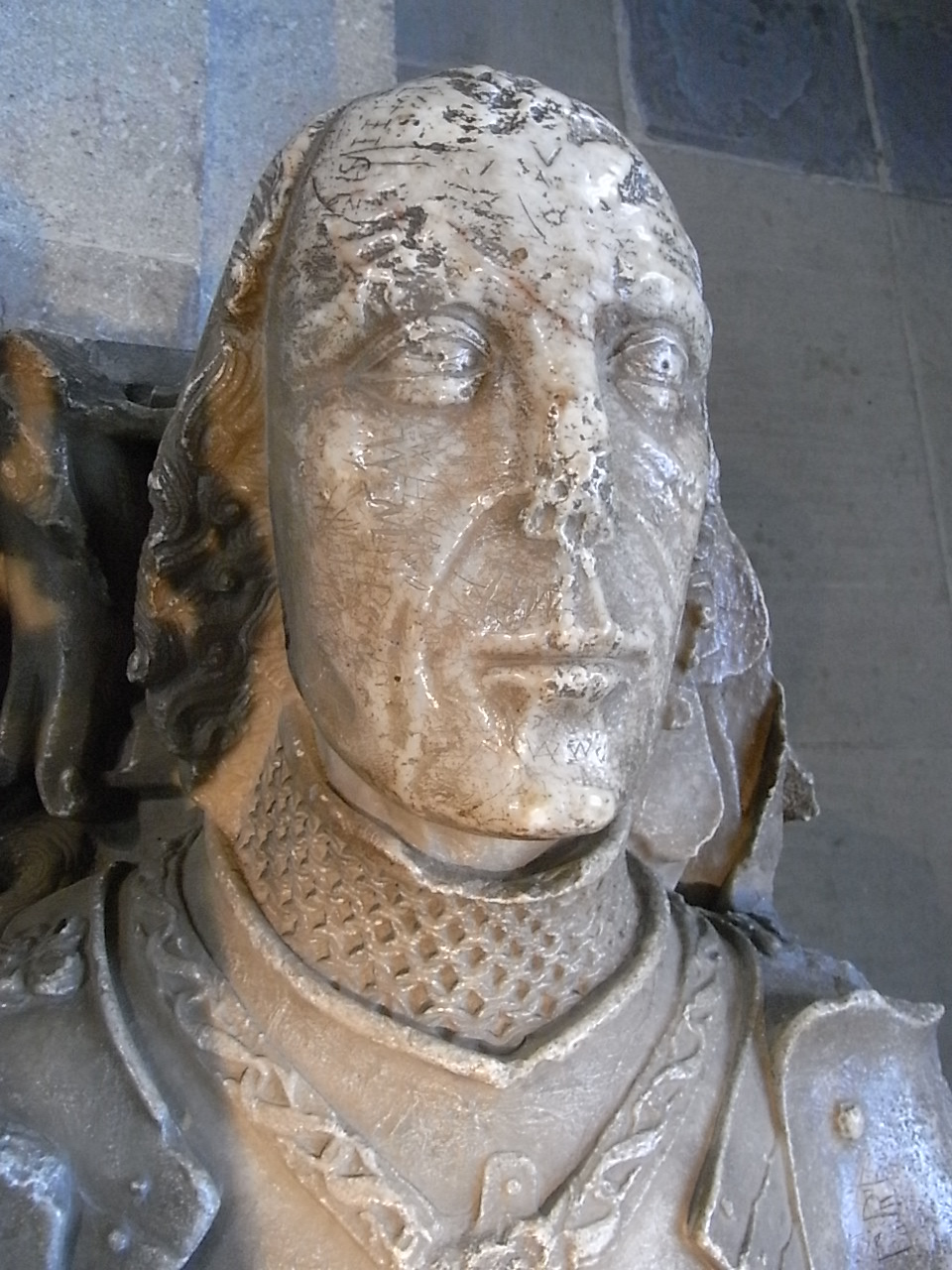
Alabaster effigy of Sir David Mathew, north aisle, Llandaff Cathedral. He wears the Lancastrian livery collar of Esses

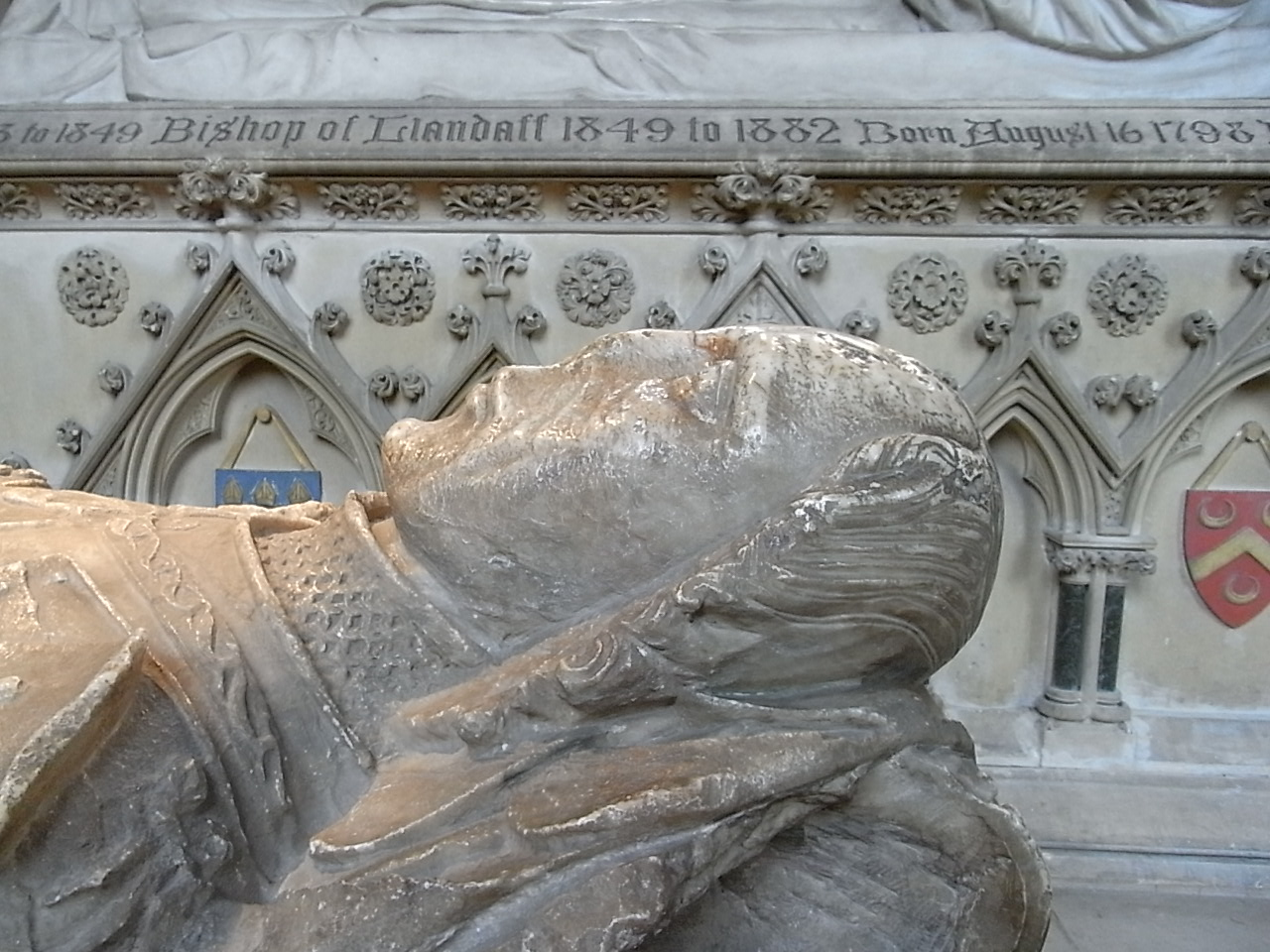
Effigy of Sir David Mathew, side-view from north, north aisle, Llandaff Cathedral

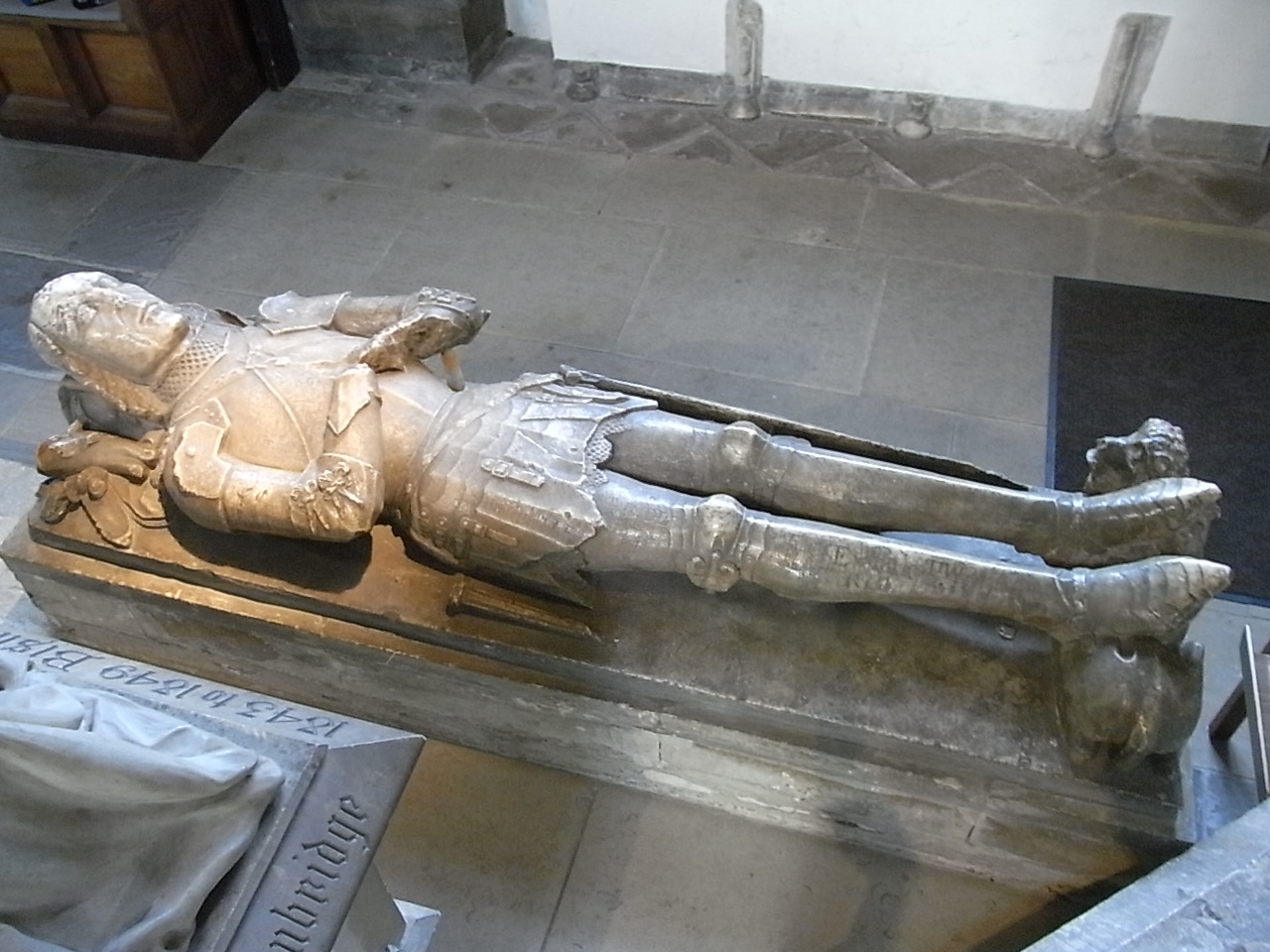
Full-length view of effigy of Sir David Mathew, Llandaff Cathedral

Arms of Mathew
left: Mathew of Llandaff: Or, a lion rampant sable.;
right: Mathew of Radyr: Sable, a lion rampant argent.

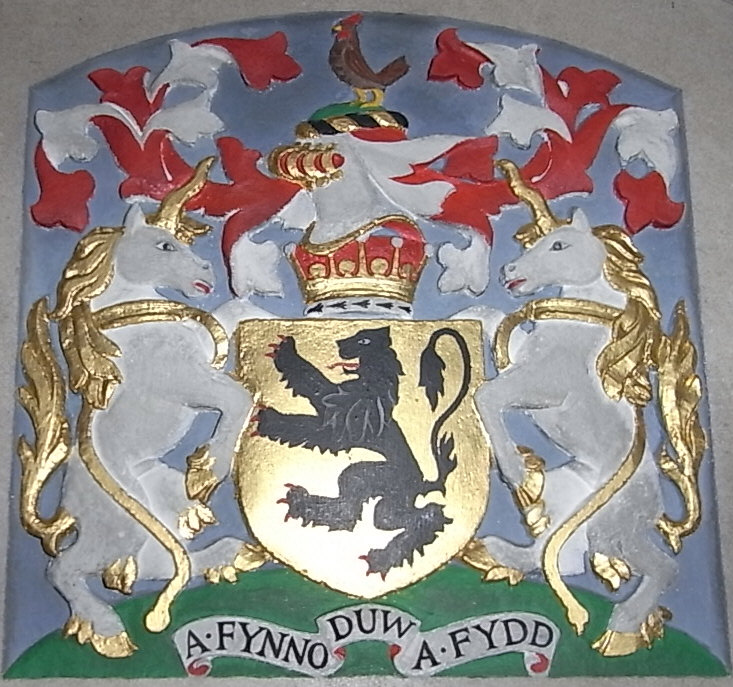
Heraldic achievement at top of mural memorial tablet erected 1987 in Llandaff Cathedral, Mathew Chapel: "In memory of Thomas James Mathew son and heir of Francis James Mathew second Earl of Landaff born in London 1798 died in Cape Town 1862". The arms are blasoned: Or, a lion rampant sable. Crest: A heathcock proper. Supporters: Two unicorns rampant silver maned tufted hooved collared and chained or. Motto: A Fynno Duw a Fydd ("What God wills will be")

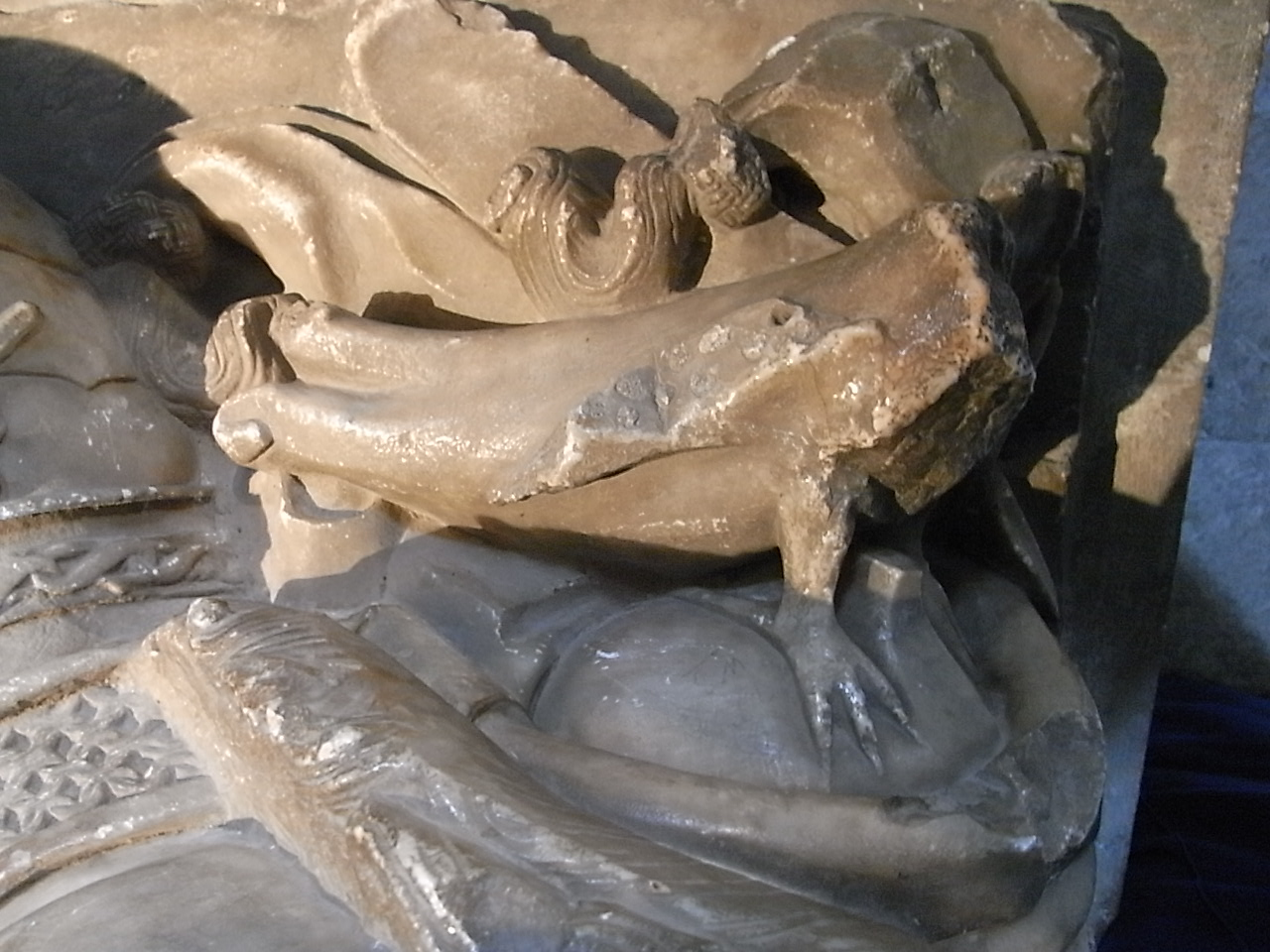
Crest on helm of effigy of Sir David Mathew, Llandaff Cathedral: a heathcock, of which the head is missing

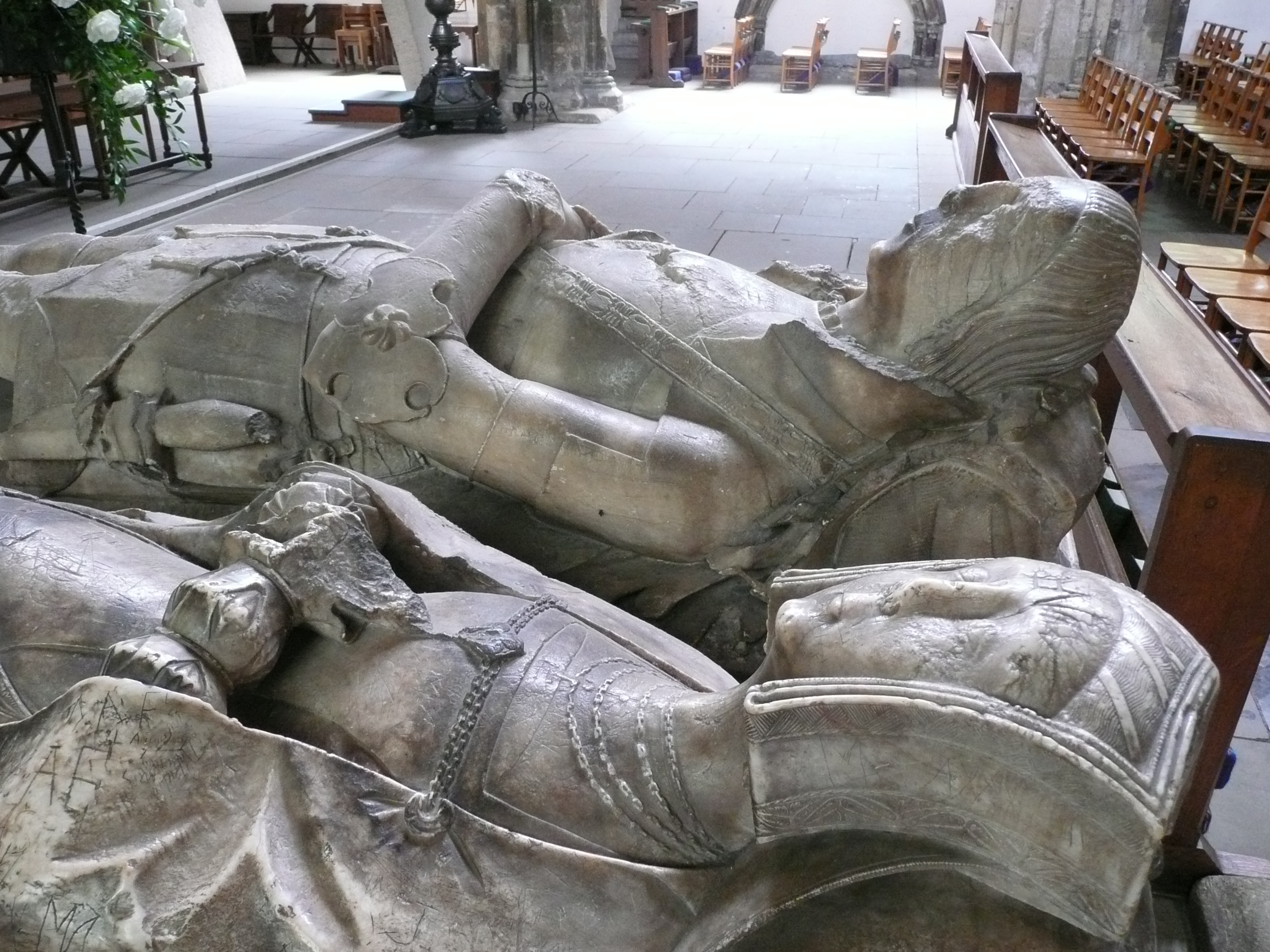
Effigies of Sir William Mathew(d.1528) and his wife. The latest of three surviving Mathew family effigies at Llandaf Cathedral (Note: Earliest effigy is of David Mathew, knight(d.1484), 2nd of Sir Christopher Mathew(d.1527), eldest son of Reyborne Mathew, 2nd son of Sir David)

Sir David Mathew (1400–1484; born Dafydd ap Mathew), was a Welsh Knight. He was Lord of Llandaff and Seneschal of Llandaff Cathedral, and one of the ten Great Barons of Glamorgan, a Marcher Lord. It was said he was one of the most distinguished men of his age and a zealous supporter of the Yorkist cause. After saving the life of King Edward IV at the Battle of Towton in 1461, he was appointed Grand Standard Bearer of England and King Edward IV granted the use of 'Towton' on his arms.

== Biography ==
Sir David Mathew was the son of Mathew ap Ieuan (or Evan). (Note: Sir David was the first to adopt the modern style of Welsh surname, "Mathew", having discontinued use of the traditional Welsh patronymic "ap Mathew", meaning "son of Mathew". The name, properly "Mathew", was spelt by Sir David's descendants variously, e.g., in the Funeral Entries, preserved in the Record Tower at Dublin, vol. vii., p. 18, the name of the founder of the Irish branch of the family is entered as "George Matthewes, Oct. 1670". Admiral Mathew of Llandaff Court, and all his descendants, spelt their name invariably "Mathews".(Mathew 1895, p. ))

Sir David was also Lord of Llandaff and Seneschal of Llandaff Cathedral. He had a grant of 2,232 acres of land from Henry VI, the reversion of Caneton, and from William, Earl of Pembroke lands at St Fagans and at Pentyrch.

Sir David was a zealous supporter of the Yorkist cause, whose extraordinary prowess and daring in the field, even at a very advanced age, were used on behalf of the White Rose of York. He was a very tall man, said to stand 6 feet 8 inches (2.03 m) tall. (Note: He was buried in Llandaff Cathedral, where his altar tomb may still be seen, the effigy of him thereon measuring 6 feet 7 inches (2.01 m) (Mathew 1895, p. ).) At the Battle of Towton, on Palm Sunday, 29 March 1461, although by then about sixty years old, he saved the life of Edward IV and was rewarded by his grateful monarch with the honour of Grand Standard Bearer of England.

Sir David was one of the ten Great Barons of Glamorgan, and a Marcher Lord. He received from Edward IV the grant of the use of the word "Towton" as an augmentation over his crest. In 1480 he restored the shrine of Saint Teilo which had been pillaged and desecrated by a gang of pirates from Biston, and was presented by Bishop Marshall with St. Teilo's skull, set in a costly reliquary, to be an heirloom in his family, who carefully preserved it for about 200 years, until the death of William Mathew in 1658 at Llandeilo.

Browne Willis reported in his An survey of the Cathedral-Church of Landaff that Sir David was murdered in an altercation at Neath, West Glamorgan by some members of the Turberville family of Coity Castle. (Note: His tomb, ornamented with full-length effigy in alabaster, is in Saint Mary's Chapel in Llandaff Cathedral, which has ever since been the property and burial-place of the family of (Mathew) is one of the most interesting extant monuments of that time. An accurate description of the various monuments of the family in this chapel may be found in An survey...: "This is said to be the Monument of David Matthew the Great, who was Standard-Bearer to Edward IV, and was murther'd at Neath ... by some of the Turberviles, with whom he was at Variance" (Willis 1718, p. 25).)

== Armorials ==
Two different arms are recorded as having been used by the Mathew family, both consisting of a lion rampant, but with differing tinctures. The branch seated at Llandaff, thus the senior line, is generally ascribed Or, a lion rampant sable, whilst the branch seated at Radyr, descended from Sir David Mathew's younger brother, is generally ascribed Sable, a lion rampant argent. Yet confusingly the 1980 heraldic restoration of the Mathew tombs at Llandaff carried out by Hugh P. Mathew, who was recognised by the College of Arms as having proved his direct descent from Sir David Mathew, has resulted in the Radyr coat being painted on the tomb of Sir Christopher, who was head of the Llandaff branch. Rev. Murray Mathew (1895) assigns to Sir David the Radyr coat. Moreover, the Earls Landaff used the coat of the Llandaff branch even though they were descended from the Radyr branch. Unfortunately the tomb of Sir David bears no heraldry by which the confusion might be resolved. The arms of Radyr Sable, a lion rampant argent were supposedly adopted in honour of the White Rose, according to Rev Murray Mathew.

=== Crest ===
The crest is also not without confusion, being given variously as a "heathcock" (another name for partridge, of the pheasant family), a "moorcock", a "fieldcock", (a vague term possibly denoting grouse), a blackcock, (of the grouse family) and is shown on the Earl Landaff memorial in a form akin to a farmyard cock or rooster. The effigy of Sir David does however show most of the bird forming the crest of his helm upon which he rests his head, but it is missing the head. The feet are short and sturdy, suggesting a grouse-type bird and are not the long legs of a rooster. (Note: The heathcock crest may be observed on the helm of the effigy of Sir David Mathew in Llandaff Cathedral. The "Genealogy of the Earls of Landaff" gives the crest for Sir David as a blackcock proper, although the Earls of Landaff bore as crest a "heathcock proper", which is however depicted akin to a rooster on the mural monument erected in 1987 in memory of Thomas James Mathew(d.1862), son and heir of Francis Mathew, 2nd Earl Landaff in the Mathew Chapel, Llandaff) A gilded bird, probably a dove, is used as a foot-rest in the effigy of St Teilo in Llandaff Cathedral.

=== Motto ===
The motto of Mathew is in Welsh: Y Fyn Duw A Fydd ("What God willeth will be").

== Family ==
Sir David married Wenllian 1396–1470 of Glamorgan, daughter of Sir George Herbert. He left by Wenllian three sons.

He had the following three sons:

- David (born 1425 1st. son) He married Ann Myddletonn (b. 1430), with whom he had one son, Jenkyn Mathew. David was the founder of the "Mathews" American line, which would eventually arrive in the new world with Thomas Mathews (b. 1660) Thomas arrived in Halifax, Virginia, circa 1700.
- Reyborn (or "Reinborn, Rimbron," etc.)(d.1470), 2nd. son. He was the founder of the Llandaf line of Mathew, having married Isabella (or Elizabeth) Denys, daughter of Maurice Denys(d.1466), esquire, of Alveston, Glos., Sheriff of Gloucestershire, by his 2nd wife Alice Poyntz, da. of Sir Nicholas Poyntz of Iron Acton, Gloucestershire. Reyborn's will (dated 20 October 1470, proved 15 March 1471) directed that he should be buried in the Chapel of the Virgin Mary within The Gaunt's Chapel, Bristol, where the Poyntz family later in about 1520 built a family chapel. His will directed that gold & silver items be placed upon the shrine of "his kinsmen" Saint Teilo, Saint Oudoceus and Saint Dubricius at Llandaff Cathedral. Reyborn's eldest son and heir was Sir Christopher Mathew(d.1528), whose effigy is one of three surviving Mathew effigies in Llandaf Cathedral. Sir Christopher's son was Miles Mathew, Sheriff of Glamorgan in 1547. A later descendant was Admiral Thomas Mathews(d.1751) who built Llandaff Court and was court-martialled in mysterious circumstances.
- Thomas (1438–1470), 3rd son. He is mentioned in Reyborn's will, and had been the custodian of the relics of St Teilo. He married Catherine ferch Morgan (1436–1468), daughter of Welsh nobleman Morgan ap Llewellyn, and founded the Radyr line of Mathew. He was also buried at The Gaunt's Chapel, Bristol. On Thomas' death in 1470, his lands passed to his son William Mathew (1460–1528), who was knighted by King Henry VII at the Battle of Bosworth in 1485. Sir William accompanied King Henry VIII to the Field of the Cloth of Gold in 1520. Sir Knight William's successor was his eldest son Sir George Mathew (1486–1557) who became the MP for Glamorgan constituency and in 1545 Sheriff of Glamorgan. From the Radyr line was founded the family of the Earls Landaff in the peerage of Ireland.
