= Dimmock =

Dimmock is a surname. Notable people with the surname include:

- Arthur Dimmock (1918–2007), English writer on deaf matters
- Charlie Dimmock (born 1966), English gardening expert and presenter
- Emily Dimmock, victim of the Camden Town Murder (London, 1907)
- Haydn Dimmock (1895-1955), British Scout, writer and editor
- Jessica Dimmock (born 1978), documentary photojournalist based in New York City
- Jimmy Dimmock (1900–1972), footballer who scored the winning goal for Tottenham Hotspur in the 1921 FA Cup Final
- Peter Dimmock (1920–2015), pioneering sports broadcaster of British television during its formative years in the 1950s
- Gary Dimmock (born 1979), investigative reporter based in Ottawa and known for his work in wrongful convictions in murder cases

== See also ==
- Dimmock, West Virginia
- Dimmock v Secretary of State for Education and Skills, a lawsuit concerning the use of Al Gore's documentary An Inconvenient Truth
- Dimock (disambiguation)
- Dymock (disambiguation)
