= Dimock (surname) =

Dimock is a surname. Notable people with the surname include:

- Bill Dimock (1923–2016), Canadian ice hockey player
- Davis Dimock Jr. (1801–1842), American politician
- Edith Dimock (1876–1955), American painter
- Edward Jordan Dimock (1890–1986), American judge
- Henry F. Dimock (1842–1911), American lawyer
- Ichabod Dimock (d. 1858), Canadian farmer, magistrate and political figure
- Shubael Dimock (c. 1753–1834), Canadian political figure
- Susan Dimock (1847–1875), American physician
- Susan Ann Dimock, Canadian philosopher and professor
- Timothy Dimock (1799–1874), American physician and politician
- Wai Chee Dimock, American professor
- Wilbert David Dimock (1846–1930), Canadian educator, journalist and politician
