= King's Champion =

Ceremonial officer in the United Kingdom

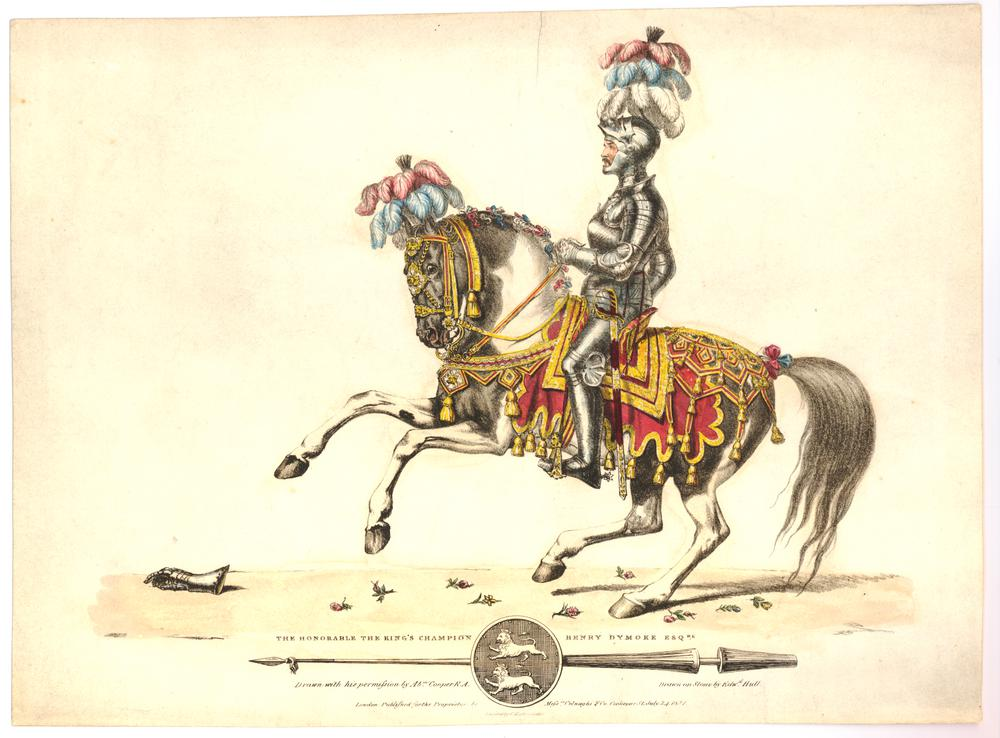
The King's Champion in 1821, Henry Dymoke, the last holder of the office to lay down his challenge at a coronation.

The Honourable The King's (or Queen's) Champion is an honorary and hereditary office in the Royal Household of the British sovereign. The champion's original role at the coronation of a British monarch was to challenge anyone who contested the new monarch's entitlement to the throne to trial by combat. Although this function was last enacted at the coronation of George IV in 1821, the office continues to descend through the Dymoke family.

The Lord of the Manor of Scrivelsby in Lincolnshire, England, has, since the Norman Conquest in 1066, held the manor from the Crown by grand serjeanty of being the King's or Queen's Champion. Such person is also the Standard Bearer of England. The current King's Champion is a member of the Dymoke family, which has included many Champions.

The 35th Champion was the 34th Lord of the Manor of Scrivelsby, Thornton and Dalderby and patron of the living of Scrivelsby-cum-Dalderby, Francis John Fane Marmion Dymoke (b. 19 January 1955, d. December 2023), a farmer and former chartered accountant. He served as the King's Champion at the coronation of Charles III, where he carried the Royal Standard in the coronation procession. He served as High Sheriff of Lincolnshire in 1999.

The present Champion is his eldest son, Henry Francis Marmion Dymoke (born 1984).

== History ==
=== Origins ===
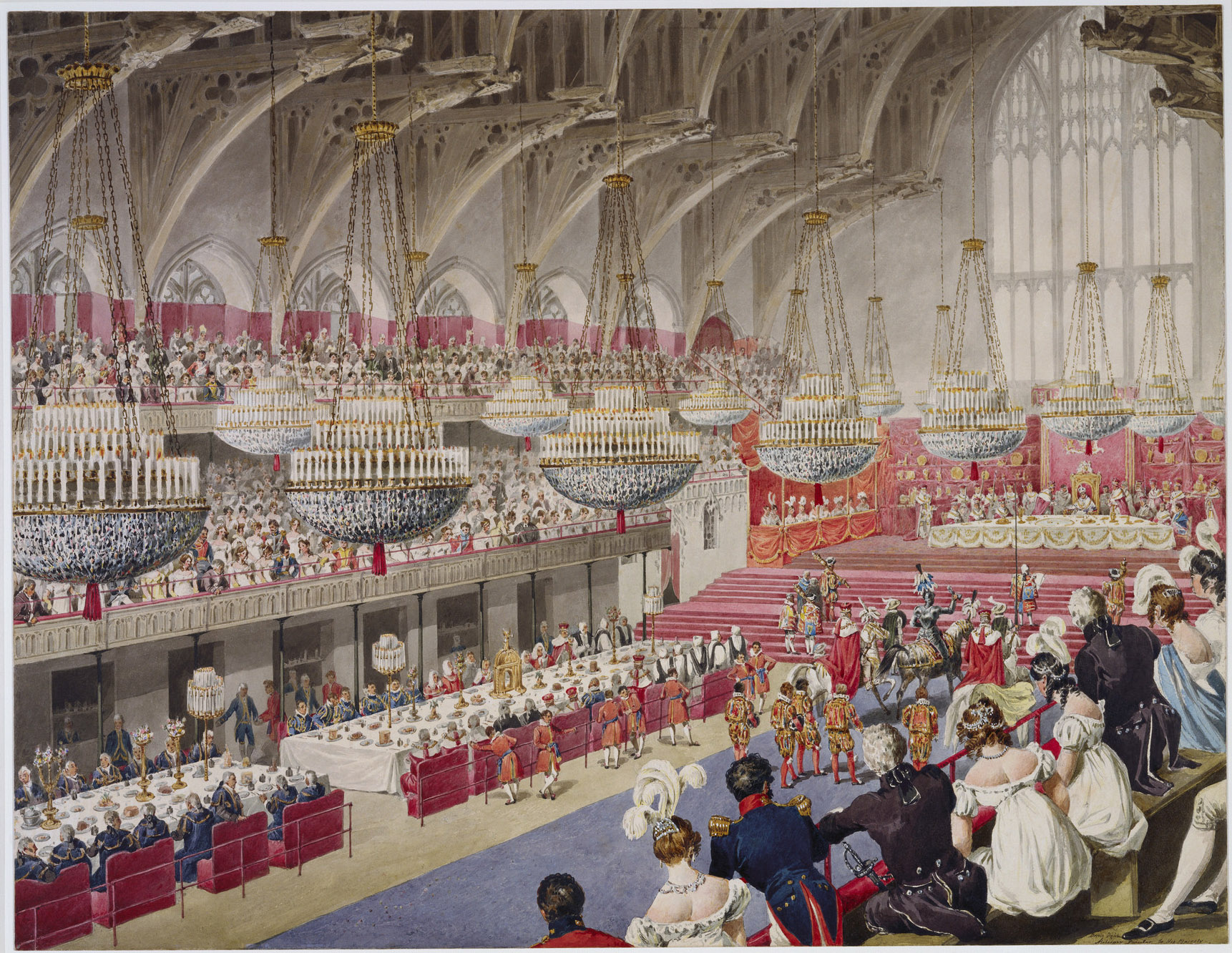
At the 1821 coronation banquet in Westminster Hall, the King's Champion makes the third and last challenge before the royal table, the last time that this ceremony was enacted.

The office of King's Champion was originally granted to Robert Marmion, 1st Baron Marmion, along with the castle and Manor of Tamworth and the Manor of Scrivelsby in the time of William the Conqueror. From then until the nineteenth century the officer's role was to act as champion for the monarch at his or her coronation, in the unlikely event that someone challenged the new monarch's title to the throne. The Champion was required to ride in full armour into Westminster Hall during the coronation banquet, escorted by the Earl Marshal and the Lord High Constable, all in full dress, robes and coronets, and await the challenge to all comers. The king could not fight in single combat against anyone except an equal. This trial by combat remained purely ceremonial and had a central place in the coronation banquet.

By 1377 the senior male line of the Marmions had died out, and in that year the office of King's Champion at the coronation of King Richard II was fulfilled by Sir John Dymoke, who had married Margaret Ludlow, granddaughter of Sir Thomas Ludlow and Johanna Marmion, daughter of Sir Philip Marmion (d.1291). Margaret was the heiress of the senior branch of the Marmion family, and so held the Manor of Scrivelsby. The claim by Sir Baldwin de Freville, who then held the Manor of Tamworth, was rejected.

In later years, the Garter King of Arms read out the challenge, and the Champion threw down the gauntlet at the entrance to Westminster Hall, then again in the middle of the Hall, and lastly at the foot of the Throne, each time repeating the challenge. Each time the gauntlet was recovered by Garter. The Champion was rewarded with a gilt-covered cup, the monarch having first drunk to the Champion from it.

John II Walshe (d.1546/7) of Little Sodbury, Gloucestershire, was King's Champion at the coronation of Henry VIII in 1509 and was a great favourite of the young king.

=== Modern era ===
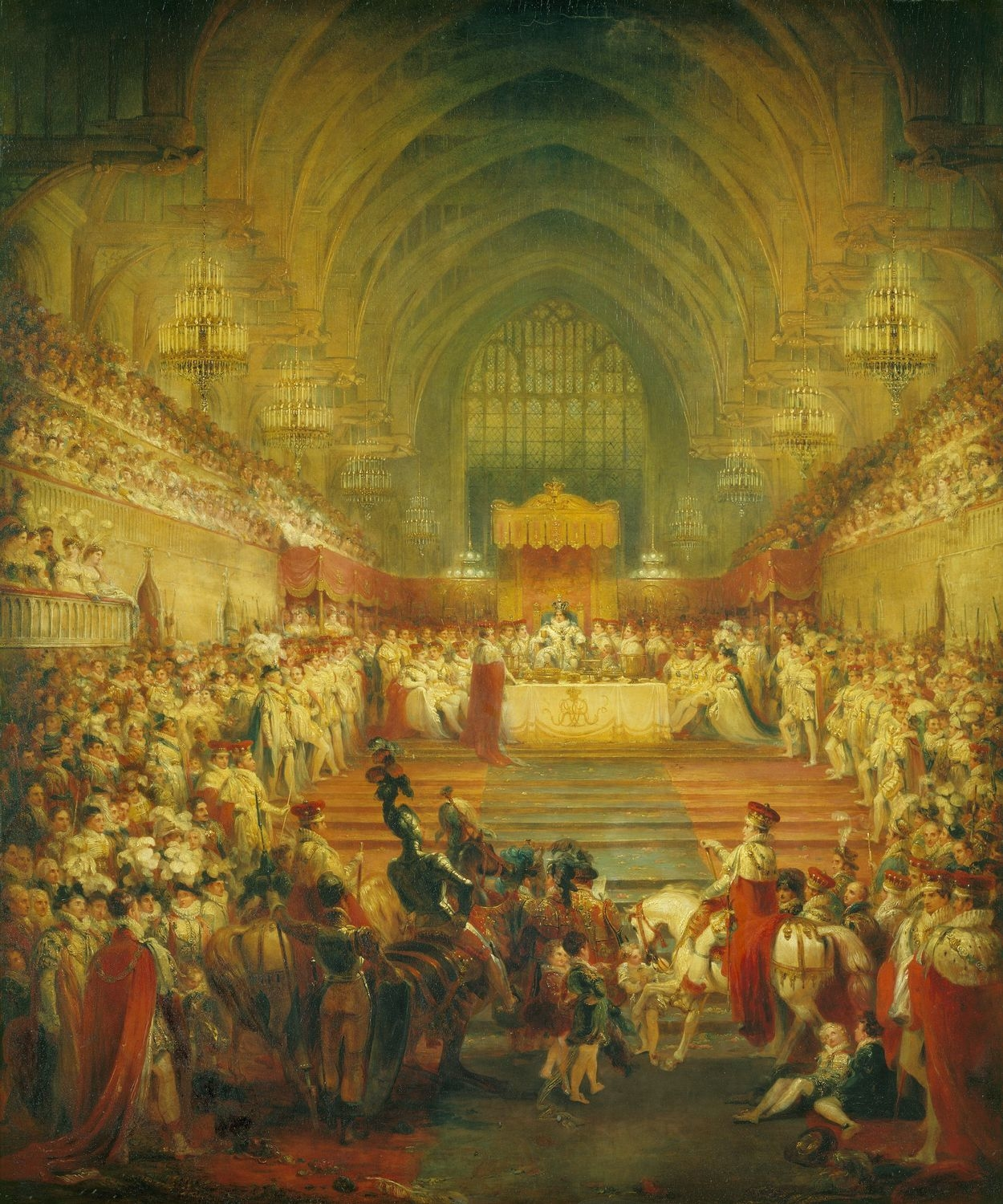
The Banquet at the Coronation of George IV by George Jones showed the event in a pageant-like scene.

The words of the challenge varied over the years, but those used for the coronation of George IV in 1821 were these:

If any person, of whatever degree soever, high or low, shall deny or gainsay our Sovereign Lord George, King of the United Kingdom of Great Britain and Ireland, Defender of the Faith, son and next heir unto our Sovereign Lord the last King deceased, to be the right heir to the imperial Crown of this realm of Great Britain and Ireland, or that he ought not to enjoy the same; here is his Champion, who saith that he lieth, and is a false traitor, being ready in person to combat with him, and in this quarrel will adventure his life against him on what day soever he shall be appointed.

The holder of the post at that time, John Dymoke, was a clergyman and so the honour passed to his son, Henry Dymoke, who was only 20 years old and did not possess a suitable horse, so one had to be hired from Astley's Circus.

William IV held no coronation banquet in 1831, so the King's Champion was not called upon to act. At the Coronation of Queen Victoria in 1838, it was decided not to include the traditional ride and challenge of the Champion, and Henry Dymoke was made a baronet in recompense. The ride and challenge has never yet been revived.

At the 1902 coronation of Edward VII, the Dymoke family's claim to undertake a historic role in the coronation was admitted by the Court of Claims, and he was allowed to be Standard Bearer of England. John Dymoke had his claim admitted at the coronation of Queen Elizabeth II in 1953 and acted as Standard-Bearer of the Union Flag. At the coronation of King Charles III in 2023, John Dymoke's son Francis carried the Royal Standard after his claim to undertake a historic role in the coronation was upheld by the Coronation Claims Office.

The Champion's Armour used for the coronations of James I to George IV still exists and is on display in St George's Hall, Windsor Castle.

== Office holders ==
Name	Year(s)	Notes	Ref.
Sir John Dymoke	1377	Champion at the coronation of Richard II. Recognised as champion by right of his marriage to his wife Margery.	
Sir Thomas Dymoke	1399, 1413	Champion at the coronations of Henry IV and Henry V	
Sir Philip Dymoke	1429	Champion at the coronation of Henry VI	
Sir Thomas Dymoke	c. 1460	Champion at the coronation of Edward IV	
Sir Robert Dymoke	1483, 1485, 1509	Champion at the coronations of Richard III, Henry VII and Henry VIII	
Sir Edward Dymoke	1547, 1553, 1559, 1603	Champion to Edward VI, Mary I, Elizabeth I and James I; son of Robert	
Sir Henry Lee	1570	Champion to Elizabeth I	
Charles Dymoke	1625	Champion to Charles I	
Edward Dymoke	1660	Champion to Charles II	
Charles Dymoke	1685	Champion to James II	
Charles Dymoke	1689, 1702	Champion to Mary II and William III, Anne; son of Charles	
Lewis Dymoke	1714, 1727	Champion at the coronations of George I and George II	
John Dymoke	1761	Champion at the coronation of George III	
Sir Henry Dymoke, 1st Baronet (1801–1865)	1821, 1831	Champion at the coronations of George IV (in place of his father, who as a clergyman did not act as Champion) and William IV, but not at the coronation of Queen Victoria	
Frank Scaman Dymoke, 32nd of Scrivelsby (1862–1946)	1902, 1911, 1937	Champion to Edward VII, George V, Edward VIII and George VI	
John Dymoke, 34th of Scrivelsby (1926–2015)	1953	Champion at the coronation of Elizabeth II; grandson of Frank	
Francis Dymoke, 35th of Scrivelsby (1955–2023)	2023	Champion at the coronation of Charles III; son of John	

== Bibliography ==
- Lodge, The Rev. Samuel (1893). Scrivelsby, The Home of the Champions. Horncastle: W K Morton.
- Strong, Sir Roy (2005). Coronation: A History of Kingship and the British Monarchy. London: Harper Collins. ISBN 978-0-00-716054-9.
