= Dymoke =

English hereditary king's champions (c.1340–c.1580)

- Family
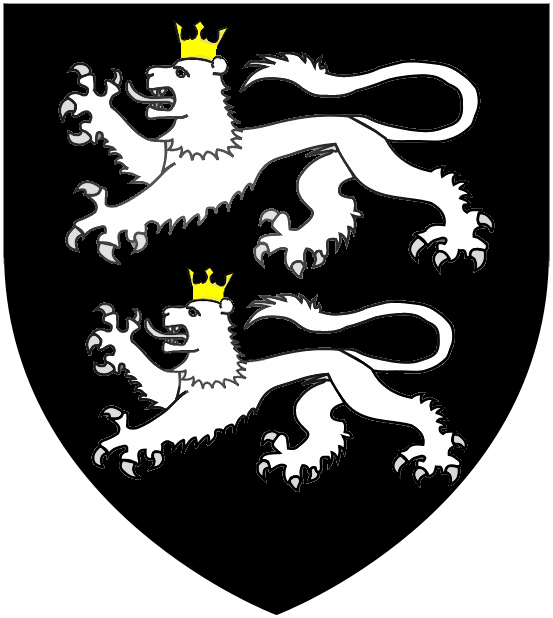
- Arms of Dymoke: Sable, two lions passant in pale argent ducally crowned or
- Distinctions: King's/Queen's Champion

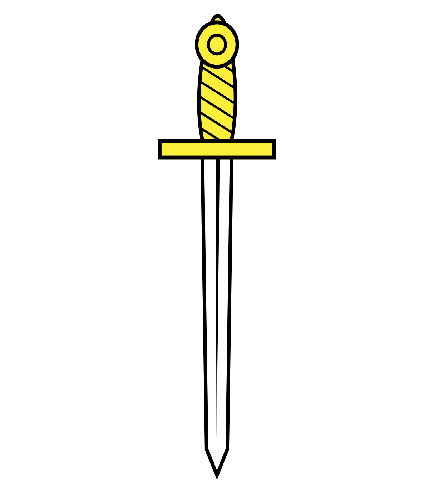
Badge of Dymoke: A sword erect argent pommel and hilt or. The Latin canting motto of Dymoke is: Pro Rege Dimico ("I contend for the King")

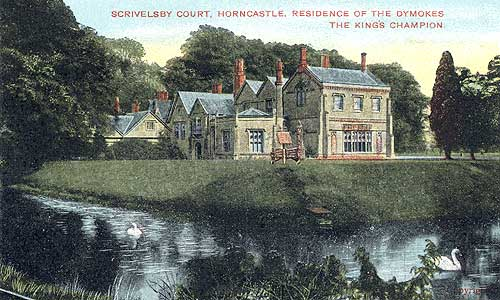
Scrivelsby Court, Horncastle, Lincolnshire, ancient seat of the Dymoke family

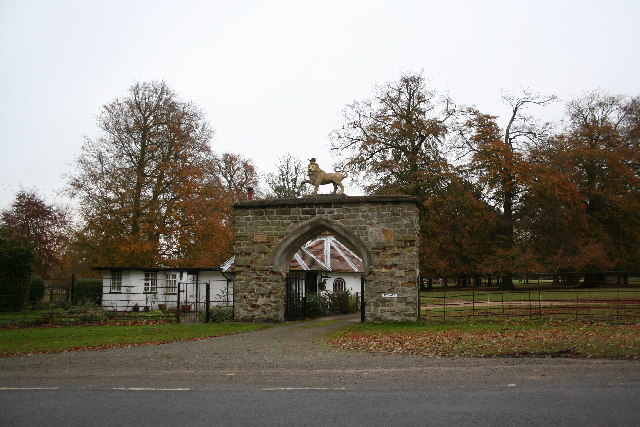
The "Lion Gateway", Scrivelsby Court, atop which stands one of the two crowned lions in the Dymoke armorials

The Dymoke family of the Manor of Scrivelsby in the parish of Horncastle in Lincolnshire holds the feudal hereditary office of King's Champion. The functions of the Champion are to ride into Westminster Hall at the (now defunct) coronation banquet and challenge all comers who might impugn the King's title.

== History ==
The earliest record of the ceremony at the coronation of an English king dates from the accession of King Richard II (1377–1399). On that occasion, the Champion was Sir John Dymoke (died 1381), who held the manor of Scrivelsby in Lincolnshire, in right of his wife Margaret, granddaughter of Joan Ludlow, who was a daughter and co-heiress of Philip Marmion, 5th Baron Marmion of Tamworth (died 1291), the last baron. The Marmion family claimed descent from the lords of Fontenay, hereditary Champions of the Dukes of Normandy, and were feudal barons of Tamworth in Nottinghamshire, seated at Tamworth Castle and also held the manor of Scrivelsby in Lincolnshire. The right to the Championship was disputed with the Dymoke family by Sir Baldwin de Freville, whose family succeeded that of Marmion as feudal barons of Tamworth, who was descended from Joan Marmion, a daughter and co-heiress of Philip Marmion (d.1291), by her husband Alexander de Freville (d.1328). The Court of Claims eventually decided in favour of the tenant of Scrivelsby because Scrivelsby was held from the king by the feudal tenure of grand serjeanty, that is to say, its tenure demanded the rendering of a special service, namely acting as King's Champion.

Sir Thomas Dymoke (d. 12 March 1470) joined a Lancastrian rising in 1469, and with his brother-in-law Richard Welles, 7th Baron Welles, was beheaded on 12 March 1470 at Queen's Cross, Stamford, Lincolnshire, by order of King Edward IV after he had been induced to leave sanctuary at Westminster Abbey by the promise of a royal pardon.

The Dymoke estates were restored to Sir Thomas Dymoke's son, Sir Robert Dymoke (died 1546), Champion at the coronations of Kings Richard III (1483–1485), Henry VII (1485–1509) and Henry VIII (1509–1547), who also distinguished himself at the Siege of Tournai in 1513, and became the King's Treasurer. His descendants acted as Champions at successive coronations. A second son, Sir Lionel Dymoke (died 1519) was knighted in 1513 at the Siege of Tournai by King Henry VIII. Legend has it that a suit of armour formerly belonging to Sir Lionel Dymoke, which 'kept guard' over his remains in St. Mary's Church, Horncastle, was taken from the building in 1536 and worn by Phillip Trotter, one of the leaders of the Lincolnshire Rebellion. The church contains monumental brasses depicting Sir Lionel Dymoke clad in armour and kneeling on a cushion with plates showing his three daughters and two step-sons.

Jane Dymoke (died 1743) wife of the Hon Charles Dymoke, who was Champion at the coronation of William III and Mary II is buried alongside her father Robert Snoden Esq (son of the Bishop of Carlisle) in the church's chancel. Her hatchment in the form of a lozenge, which shape is usual for a female, displays the arms of Dymoke (Sable, two lions passant in pale argent ducally crowned or) impaling the arms of Snoden (A lion or) of which family she was an heiress. As Charles Dymoke died without issue the title of Champion passed to his brother Lewis Dymoke of Scrivelsby.

The following story respecting Charles Dymoke, in 1689 the Champion of William and Mary, was printed in the "Gazetteer" of August 1784, nearly a century after the event, and therefore open to some suspicion:

"The Champion of England (Dymoke), dressed in armour of complete and glittering steel, his horse richly caparisoned, and his beaver finely capped with plumes of feathers, entered Westminster Hall, according to ancient custom, while the king and queen were at dinner. And, at his giving the usual challenge to any one that disputed their majesties' right to the crown of England, . . . . after he had flung down his gauntlet on the pavement, an old woman, who entered the Hall on crutches, . . . . took it up, and made off with great celerity, leaving her own glove with a challenge in it to meet her the next day, at an appointed hour, in Hyde Park. This occasioned some mirth at the lower end of the Hall, and it was remarked that every one was too well engaged to pursue her. A person in the same dress appeared the next day at the place appointed, though it was generally supposed to be a good swordsman in that disguise. However, the Champion of England politely declined any contest of that nature with one of the fair sex, and never made his appearance".

Lewis Dymoke (died 1820) put in an unsuccessful claim before the House of Lords for the barony of Marmion. His nephew Sir Henry Dymoke, 1st Baronet (1801–1865) was champion in 1821 at the coronation of King George IV (reigned 1820–1830), the last time the traditional ritual was enacted. He was accompanied on that occasion by the Duke of Wellington and Kenneth Howard, 1st Earl of Effingham. King William IV (1830–1837) held no coronation banquet in 1831, so the King's Champion was not called upon to act. At the Coronation of Queen Victoria in 1838, it was decided not to include the traditional ride and challenge of the Champion, and in recompense, in 1841 Henry Dymoke was made a baronet. The ceremony has never been revived.

Sir Henry Dymoke, 1st Baronet was succeeded by his brother John Dymoke, Rector of Scrivelsby (1804–1873), whose son Henry Lionel Dymoke died without issue in 1875 when the estate passed to a collateral branch of the family. After the coronation of King George IV, the ceremony was allowed to lapse, and that occasion was the last in full armour. However at the coronation of King Edward VII (1901–1910) H. S. Dymoke bore the Standard of England in Westminster Abbey.

== Modern times ==
In 1953 Lieutenant Colonel John Lindley Marmion Dymoke, MBE, 33rd of Scrivelsby and 7th of Tetford (1 Sept. 1926- 21 Mar. 2015), attended the coronation of Queen Elizabeth II (1952–2022) as Queen's Champion and bore the Union Standard.

The most recent head of the family was Francis John Fane Marmion Dymoke (1955–2023), 34th of Scrivelsby and 8th of Tetford, the eldest son of Lieutenant Colonel John Lindley Marmion Dymoke. Francis carried the Royal Standard at the 2023 Coronation of Charles III and Camilla. Upon his death on 18 December 2023, he was succeeded by his elder son, Henry Francis Marmion Dymoke (b. 1984), 35th of Scrivelsby and 9th of Tetford.

The novelist Anthony Powell was a descendant of the Dymoke family on his mother's side.

== See also ==
- Lee, Sidney (1888). "Dymoke, John" . In Stephen, Leslie (ed.). Dictionary of National Biography. Vol. 16. London: Smith, Elder & Co. pp. 294–296.
- Musson, A.J. (2004). "Dymoke family (per. c.1340–c.1580)". Oxford Dictionary of National Biography (online ed.). Oxford University Press. doi:10.1093/ref:odnb/42007. (Subscription, Wikipedia Library access or UK public library membership required.)
- Lodge, The Rev. Samuel (1893). Scrivelsby, The Home of the Champions. Horncastle: W K Morton.
- Burke's Genealogical and Heraldic History of the Landed Gentry, 15th Edition, ed. Pirie-Gordon, H., London, 1937, pp. 671–3, pedigree of Dymoke of Scrivelsby
