= Charles Dymoke =

16th-century English politician

Charles Dymoke (died 1611), of Howell, Lincolnshire, was an English politician.

He was a member (MP) of the parliament of England for Lincoln in 1593.
