= Henry Dymoke =

British landowner

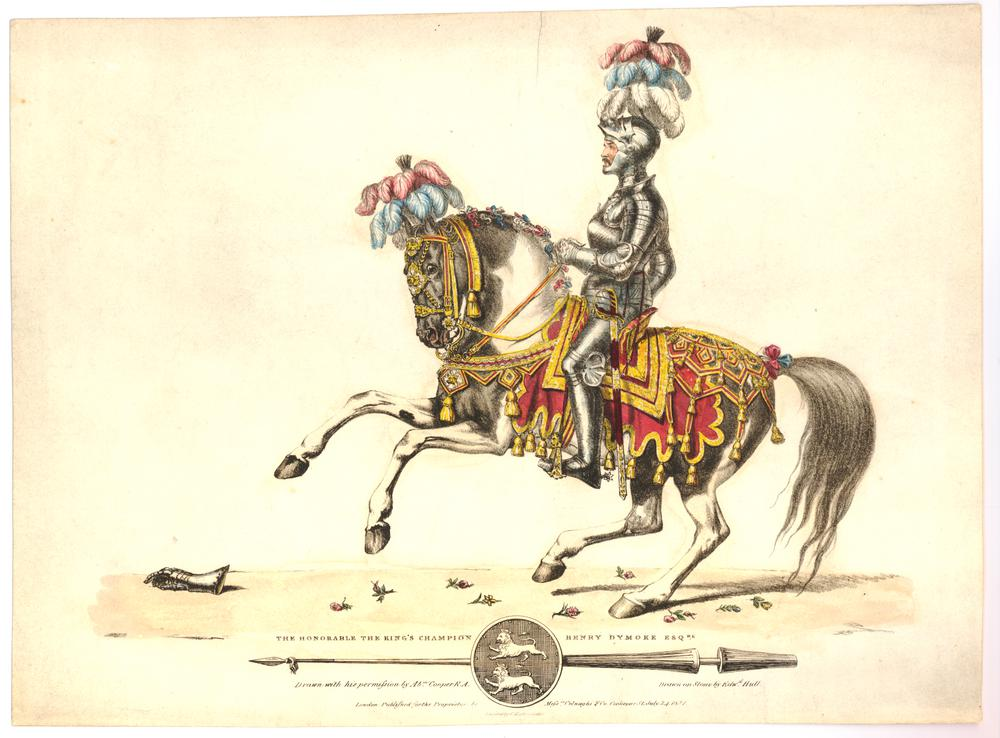
The Honrable the King's Champion Henry Dymoke Esq. 1821, coronation of George IV, King of the United Kingdom

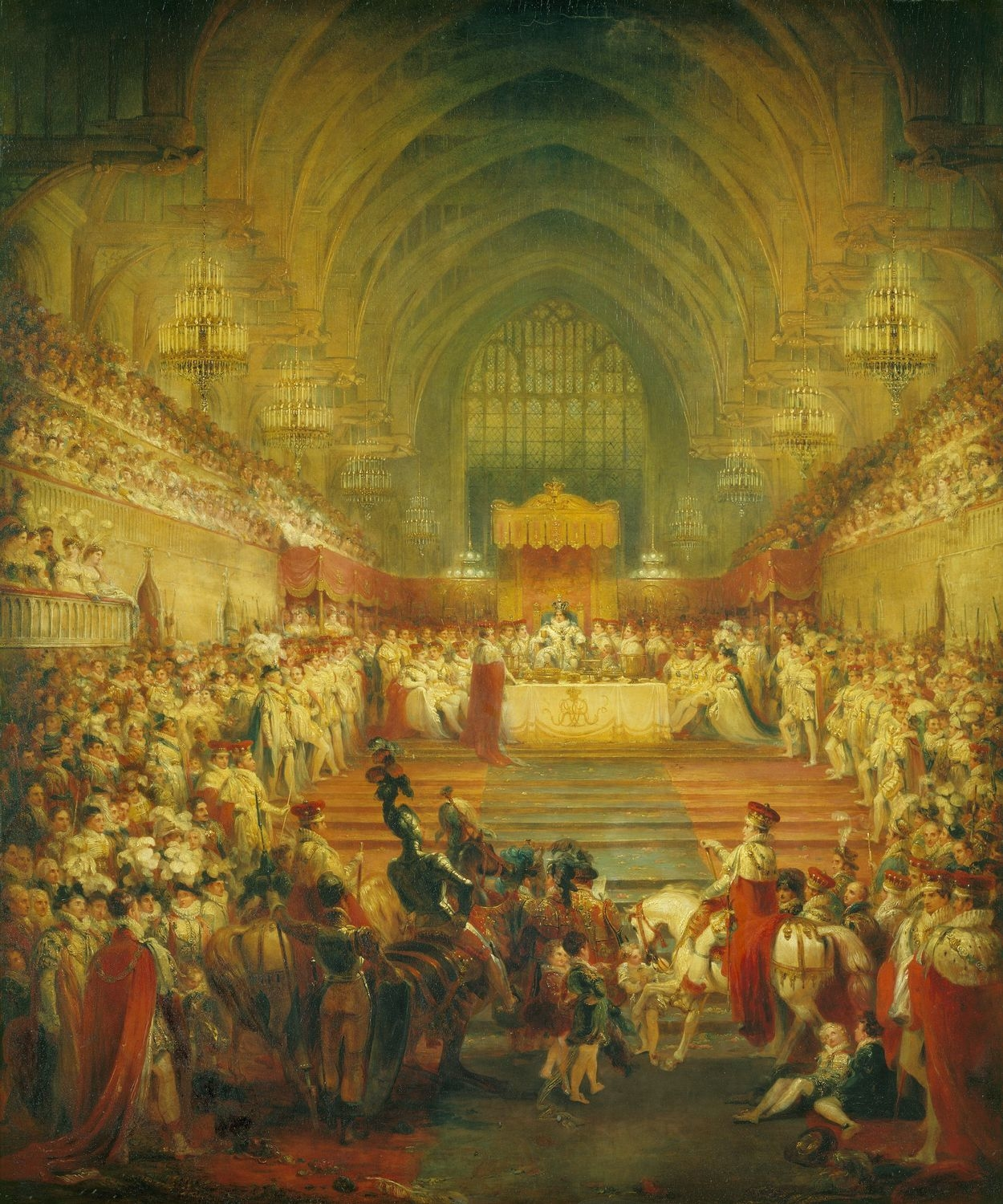
The Banquet at the Coronation of George IV by George Jones, 1822.

Sir Henry Dymoke, 1st Baronet (1801 – 28 April 1865), was a British landowner and the hereditary King's Champion.

Dymoke was the son of Reverend John Dymoke. He was High Sheriff of Lincolnshire in 1833. As the holder of the manor of Scrivelsby, Lincolnshire, he was the hereditary King's Champion. He officiated at the coronations of George IV (in place of his father who was then still alive, but as a clergyman could not act as Champion) and William IV. However, at the coronation of Queen Victoria this function was dispensed with. Probably as a way of compensation, Dymoke was made a baronet, of Scrivelsby in the County of Lincoln, in 1841 (the normal honour for a King's Champion was a knighthood).

Dymoke died in April 1865 and the baronetcy became extinct.

Honorary titles
Preceded by William Hutton	High Sheriff of Lincolnshire; 1833	Succeeded by Christopher Turnor
Baronetage of the United Kingdom
New creation	Baronet (of Scrivelsby); 1841–1865	Extinct
