= Roger Dymock =

English theologian (fl. 1370–c. 1400)

Roger Dymock or Dymoke (fl. 1370 – c. 1400) was an English theologian. He graduated D.D. at Oxford. He was probably a Dominican friar, or possibly a monk. He was the author of an unpublished treatise against Lollardy, entitled Adversus duodecim errores et hæreses Lollardorum.

== Life ==
Roger Dymock studied at Oxford, and there proceeded to the degree of doctor in divinity. He is known only by an unpublished treatise, Adversus duodecim errores et hæreses Lollardorum, addressed to Richard II. From the account given of the Paris manuscript of this work, that it was directed 'adversus libellum famosum Lollardorum publicatum atque allatum apud Westmonasterium in ostio aulæ regalis in pleno parliamento', it is clear that it is a reply to the twelve 'conclusions' of the Lollards which were produced in the parliament of 1395, and which have been often printed. (Note: Ann. Ricardi, pp. 174 et seq., ed. T. Hearne; Fasciculi Zizaniorum, pp. 360–9, ed. W. W. Shirley, 1858; Wilkins, Concil. Magnæ Britann. iii. 221 et seq.; Lewis, Life and Sufferings of John Wiclif, pp. 337–43, ed. Oxford, 1820; the last two from the Cottonian MS., Cleopatra, E. II.; cf. Walsingham, Hist. Anglic. ii. 216, ed. H. T. Riley.) Of Dymock's work four manuscripts are mentioned. One Leland found in Wells Cathedral Library, but this had disappeared when the Catalogus Codicum Manuscriptorum Angliæ was published in 1697. The second, in the Cottonian Library, (Note: Otho, C. XVI.) perished in the fire of 1731. Of the other two, one is in the University Library at Cambridge, (Note: Catal. Codd. MSS. Angl. i. pt. iii. 171, No. 2393.) and the other in the Bibliothèque Nationale at Paris. (Note: Catal. Codd. MSS. Bibl. Reg. iii. 411 b, No. 3381, Paris, 1744, fol.) The Cambridge manuscript describes Dymock as a monk, while the Paris copy, with greater antecedent probability, makes him a Dominican friar.

== See also ==
- List of parliaments of England § Parliaments of Richard II

== Sources ==
- Hudson, Anne (2011). "Dymoke [Dymock], Roger (fl. 1370–c. 1400), prior of Boston and theologian". Oxford Dictionary of National Biography (online ed.). Oxford University Press. doi:10.1093/ref:odnb/8361. (Subscription or UK public library membership required.)

Attribution:

- This article incorporates text from a publication now in the public domain: Lane-Poole, Reginald (1896). "Dymock, Roger". In Lee, Sidney (ed.). Dictionary of National Biography. Vol. 45. London: Smith, Elder & Co. p. 293.
