= John Dymoke =

British ceremonial officer (1926–2015)

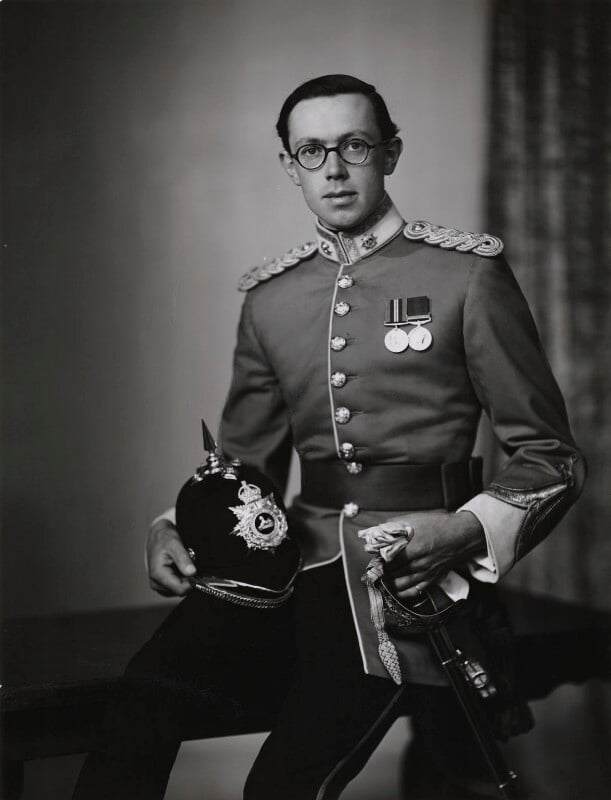
Dymoke in 1953

Lieutenant-Colonel John Lindley Marmion Dymoke MBE (1 September 1926 – 21 March 2015) was the hereditary Queen's Champion from 1946 until his death in 2015. As champion, he was present at the Coronation of Queen Elizabeth II in 1953, where he acted as Standard-Bearer of the Union Flag.

Dymoke was the 34th holder of the Manor of Scrivelsby since the Norman Conquest. He served as High Sheriff of Lincolnshire in 1979 and Vice Lord-Lieutenant of that county from 1991 to 2001.
