= Scrivelsby =

Village and civil parish in the East Lindsey district of Lincolnshire, England

Coordinates: 53.176008°N 0.104804°W

- Civil parish
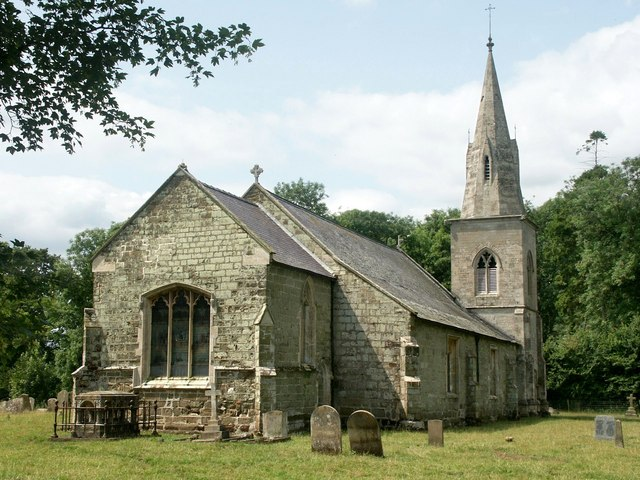
- Church of St Benedict, Scrivelsby

- Location within Lincolnshire
- Interactive map of Scrivelsby
- OS grid reference: TF267659
  - London: 120 mi (190 km) S
- District: East Lindsey
- Shire county: Lincolnshire
- Region: East Midlands
- Country: England
- Sovereign state: United Kingdom
- Post town: Horncastle
- Postcode district: LN9
- Police: Lincolnshire
- Fire: Lincolnshire
- Ambulance: East Midlands
- UK Parliament: Gainsborough

Scrivelsby is a village and civil parish in the East Lindsey district of the County of Lincolnshire, England. It is situated 2 miles (3.2 km) south of Horncastle and is on the B1183 road 1 mile (1.6 km) east from the A153 road. Historically, the manor was held by grand serjeanty, a form of feudal tenure which required the performance of a ceremonial service rather than a money payment – in this case as the King's Champion.

== History ==
The manor of Scrivelsby is listed in the Domesday Book of 1086 as "Scrivelesbi" and was held in chief from the king. It then comprised 89 households, 16 villagers, 11 smallholders and 30 freemen, with 8.5 ploughlands, a meadow of 5 acres (0.020 km^{2}), woodland of 100 acres (0.40 km^{2}), a mill and a church. In 1086 the manor was held by Robert Dispensator (Latin) ("Robert the Bursar"). Robert was succeeded by his brother Urse d'Abetot, feudal baron of Salwarpe in Worcestershire. Shortly thereafter the manor was in the possession of Roger Marmion (d.1129), of Tamworth Castle, then in Warwickshire, 1st feudal baron of Tamworth, and lord of Fountenay in Normandy. This acquisition is believed to be due to his marriage to the daughter and heiress of Urse d'Abetot. Robert Marmion held the manor of Scrivelsby by grand serjeanty on condition that he should perform the duty of King's Champion. The Marmions had historically been Champions to the Dukes of Normandy and King Henry I wanted to re-establish that relationship for his English crown.

== Lords of the Manor ==
The Marmion family died out in the male line in 1291, on the death of Philip Marmion, 5th feudal baron of Tamworth, who left four daughters and co-heiresses. His fourth daughter Joan Marmion (d.1341), whose quarter share of her paternal inheritance included the manor of Scrivelsby, married Sir Thomas de Ludlow, by whom she had a son John de Ludlow, who died without issue, and a daughter or great-granddaughter Margaret de Ludlow, who married Sir John Dymoke, who thereby inherited the manor of Scrivelsby and the feudal duty of acting as King's Champion. There had however been some confusion as to the identity of the King's Champion, as that feudal duty had appeared to descend with the tenure of Tamworth Castle, which was inherited by Mazera Marmion, Joan Marmion's elder sister and co-heiress, who married Ralph de Cromwell, by whom she had a daughter Joan de Cromwell, married to Alexander de Freville (d.1327/8). Alexander de Freville held Tamworth Castle by the service of "coming to the king's coronation armed cap-a-pie (head to foot) with royal arms delivered by the king seated upon the king's chief charger offering himself to make proof for the king against all opposing his coronation". Due to the uncertainty then surrounding the identity of the King's Champion, the ceremony was dispensed with for the coronation of King Edward III in 1328. However, it was soon resolved that the rightful Champion was the holder of Scrivelsby, and not the de Freville family of Tamworth. The Dymoke family survives today, still possessed of the manor of Scrivelsby and living at Scrivelsby Court, the (nominal) lord of the manor in 2022 being Henry Francis Marmion Dymoke (born 1984), 35th lord of the manor of Scrivelsby and 9th of Tetford.

The duty of the King's Champion was to ride fully armed into the coronation banquet at Westminster Hall and challenge anyone who doubted the new monarch's right to the throne. The Champion then threw down his gauntlet to signal that he would fight to the death anyone who might dare to do so. This action was performed three times and if no challenge was received the king was presented with a gold cup of wine from which he drank a toast to the Champion, who in turn took the cup, drank the remnant and shouted "Long live your Majesties". Although feudal tenure was abolished in England by the Tenures Abolition Act 1660, which thus abolished tenures by grand serjeanty, the traditional custom of the lord of the manor of Scrivelsby acting as King's Champion continued until the coronation of King George IV in 1821, after which it was discontinued.

== Landmarks ==
Scrivelsby Court

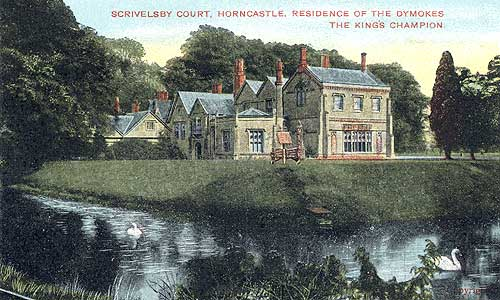
Scrivelsby Court

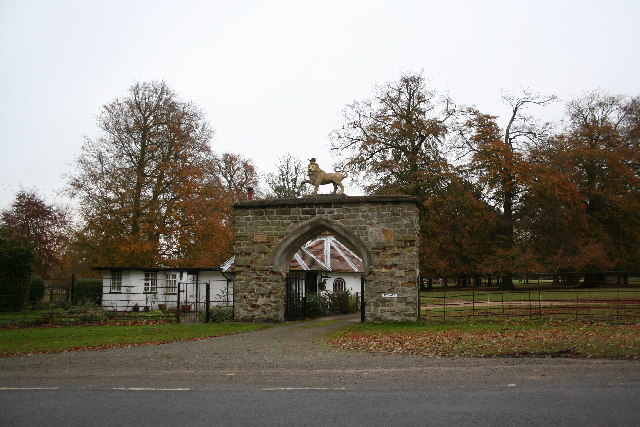
The Lion Gateway

The manor house, Scrivelsby Court, was burnt out in 1761, and was demolished between 1955 and 1957. However the gatehouse was retained and restored in 1959. The west front is predominantly 15- and 16th-century, with the rest, being Georgian and later. It is a Grade I listed building. The Lion Gateway was built around 1530 and was rebuilt in 1833. It is Grade II* listed.

The park was designed by Humphry Repton before 1791. Repton also added two octagonal lodges to the side of the Lion Gate.

The church of St Benedict originates from the 13th century, with 15th-century additions. It was completely restored in 1860 by Sir Henry Dymoke (who added a small tower with spire), in greenstone, and in Perpendicular and Early English style. A stained glass east window by Thomas Willement was part of the 1860 rebuild. Within the church is a 1776 chalice by John Swift with an 1805 paten by Samuel and George Whitworth. There are monuments to the Dymoke family and one, c.1300 of a Knight and Lady, probably to the earlier Marmian family. The churchyard contains a war grave of a Royal Garrison Artillery soldier of World War I.

== Today ==
Today Scriveslby is a country estate with deer park, still under the Dymoke family, and an event site for country fairs. In May 2012 it was announced that the estate would be part of Horncastle's events for the Queen's Diamond Jubilee, with a beacon lit as part of a sequence of National beacons.

== See also ==
- Dymoke
- King's Champion
