= Barbery, Calvados =

Barbery
- Commune
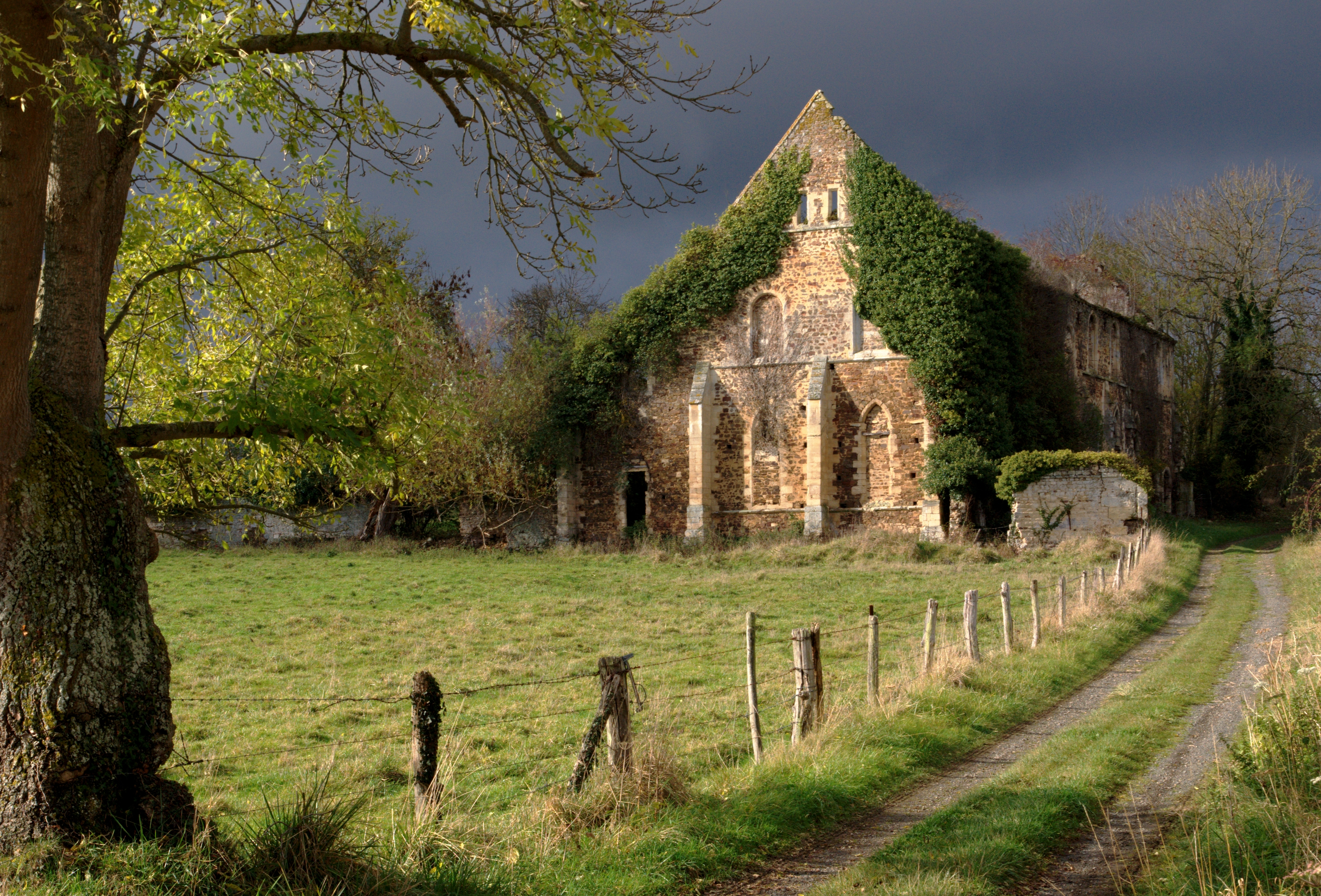
- The old Cistercian Abbey of Notre-Dame

- Coat of arms
- Location of Barbery
- Location within France Location within Normandy
- Coordinates: 49°00′38″N 0°21′09″W
- Country: France
- Region: Normandy
- Department: Calvados
- Arrondissement: Caen
- Canton: Le Hom
- Intercommunality: Cingal-Suisse Normande

Government
  - Mayor (2023–2026): Luc Lebouvier
- Area^{1}: 8.6 km^{2} (3.3 sq mi)
- Elevation: 144 m (472 ft)
- Highest elevation: 193 m (633 ft)
- Lowest elevation: 77 m (253 ft)
- Population (2023): 760
  - Density: 88/km^{2} (230/sq mi)
- Time zone: UTC+01:00 (CET)
  - Summer (DST): UTC+02:00 (CEST)
- INSEE/Postal code: 14039 /14220
- ^{1} French Land Register data, which excludes lakes, ponds, glaciers > 1 km^{2} (0.386 sq mi or 247 acres) and river estuaries.

Barbery (French pronunciation: [baʁbəʁi]) is a commune in the Calvados department in the Normandy region of north-western France.

== Geography ==
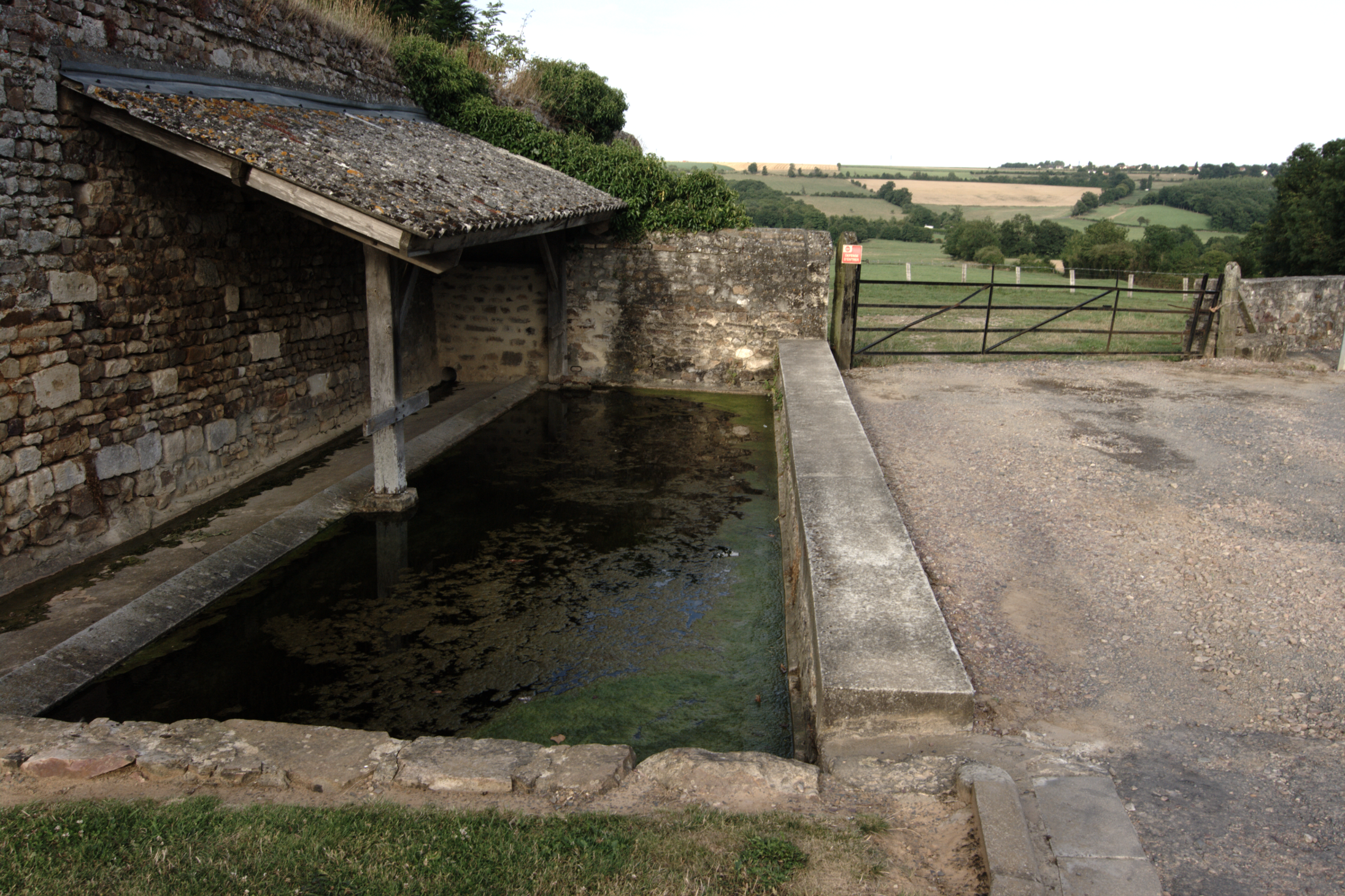
The Lavoir (Public laundry) at Mesnil-Touffray

Barbery is located some 18 km south by south-east of Caen and 10 km east by north-east of Thury-Harcourt. Access to the commune is by the D131 road from Croisilles in the south-west which passes through the heart of the commune and the village before continuing north-east to Urville. The D23 comes from Cesny-Bois-Halbout in the south and passes through the village before continuing north to join Route nationale N158 at Saint-Aignan-de-Cramesnil. The D156A goes south-east from the village to Moulines. The D237 branches off the D131 in the east of the commune and goes south-east to join the D167 east of the commune. Apart from the village there are the hamlets of L'Abbaye, Faverolles, Le Londel, and Le Mesnil Touffray. The commune is entirely farmland.

The Ruisseau du Val Clair rises north of the village and flows north to join the Laize at Bretteville-sur-Laize. The Ruisseau de Corneville also rises north of the village, east of the Ruisseau du Val Clair, and flows north to join the Laize at Les Écluses.

The commune borders the area known as Suisse Normande.

== History ==
During early medieval times Barbery and its abbey were under the control of the de Livet family.

Barbery appears as Barbery on the 1750 Cassini Map and the same on the 1790 version.

=== Heraldry ===
Arms of Barbery	Blazon: Azure, semy of billety Argent.

== Administration ==
List of Successive Mayors

From	To	Name
1997	2001	Ferdinand Lecouvey
2001	2014	Alain Crocqueville
2014	2023	Guy Pislard
2023	2026	Luc Lebouvier

== Demography ==
The inhabitants of the commune are known as Barberigeois or Barberigeoises in French.

Historical population

Year	Pop.	±% p.a.
1793	795	—
1821	666	−0.63%
1846	755	+0.50%
1872	600	−0.88%
1901	465	−0.88%
1926	419	−0.42%
1946	391	−0.35%
1962	417	+0.40%
1968	390	−1.11%

Year	Pop.	±% p.a.
1975	366	−0.90%
1982	497	+4.47%
1990	500	+0.08%
1999	524	+0.52%
2007	657	+2.87%
2012	789	+3.73%
2017	825	+0.90%
2023	760	−1.36%

Source: EHESS and INSEE

== Culture and heritage ==
=== Civil heritage ===
The commune has many buildings and sites that are registered as historical monuments:

- The Petite-Abbaye Industrial Cheese Factory (20th century)
- Farmhouses (19th century)
- A Chateau at Mesnil-Aumont (18th century)
- A Manor/Chateau at Mesnil-Touffray (15th century)
- The Old Abbey Manor at Faverolles (12th century)

=== Religious heritage ===
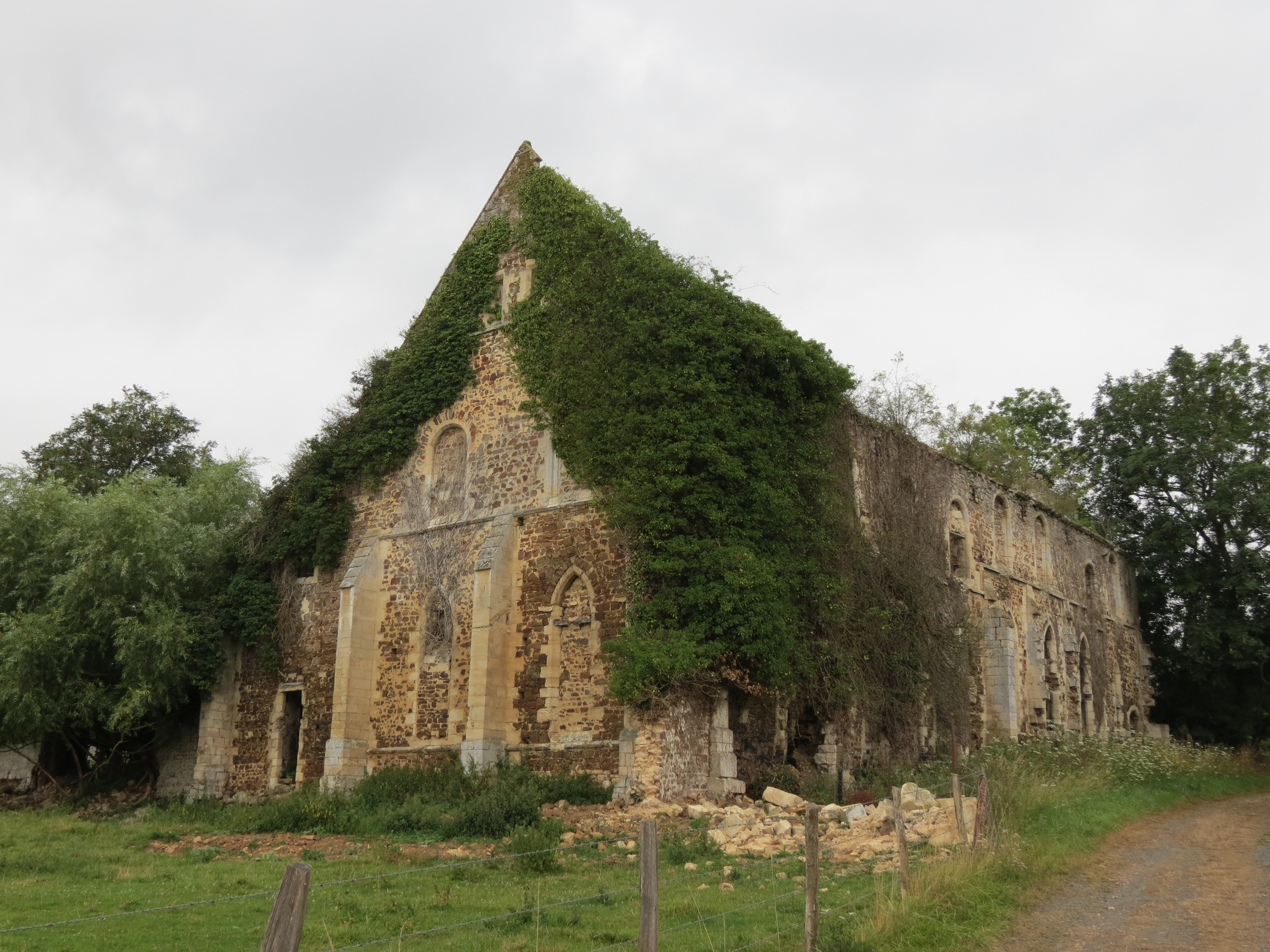
The old Abbey

The commune has several religious buildings and structures that are registered as historical monuments:

- The old Cistercian Abbey of Notre-Dame of Barbery (12th century) founded by Robert Marmion in 1181. The site is shared with the neighbouring commune of Bretteville-sur-Laize.
- The Parish Church of Saint Peter (13th century). The Church contains many items that are registered as historical objects:
  - Statues (16th-18th century)
  - A green Sofa, Armchair, and 2 Chairs (19th century)
  - A Stoup (16th century)
  - A Baptismal font (16th century)
  - An Altar and Tabernacle (18th century)
  - 4 Stained glass windows (1909/1932)
- A Presbytery (18th century)
- The Parish Church of Saint Martin at Mesnil-Touffray (13th century). The Church contains many items that are registered as historical objects:
  - Statues (16th-20th century)
  - A Pulpit (18th century) (destroyed)
  - A Baptismal font (17th century)
  - An Altar, Tabernacle, and Retable (18th century)
  - Tombstones (17th-18th century)
  - A Monument to Charles de Lalongny (1640)

== See also ==
- Communes of the Calvados department
