= Sidonie de Polignac =

French painter (c.1797–1871)

Joséphine Marie Sidonie de Polignac
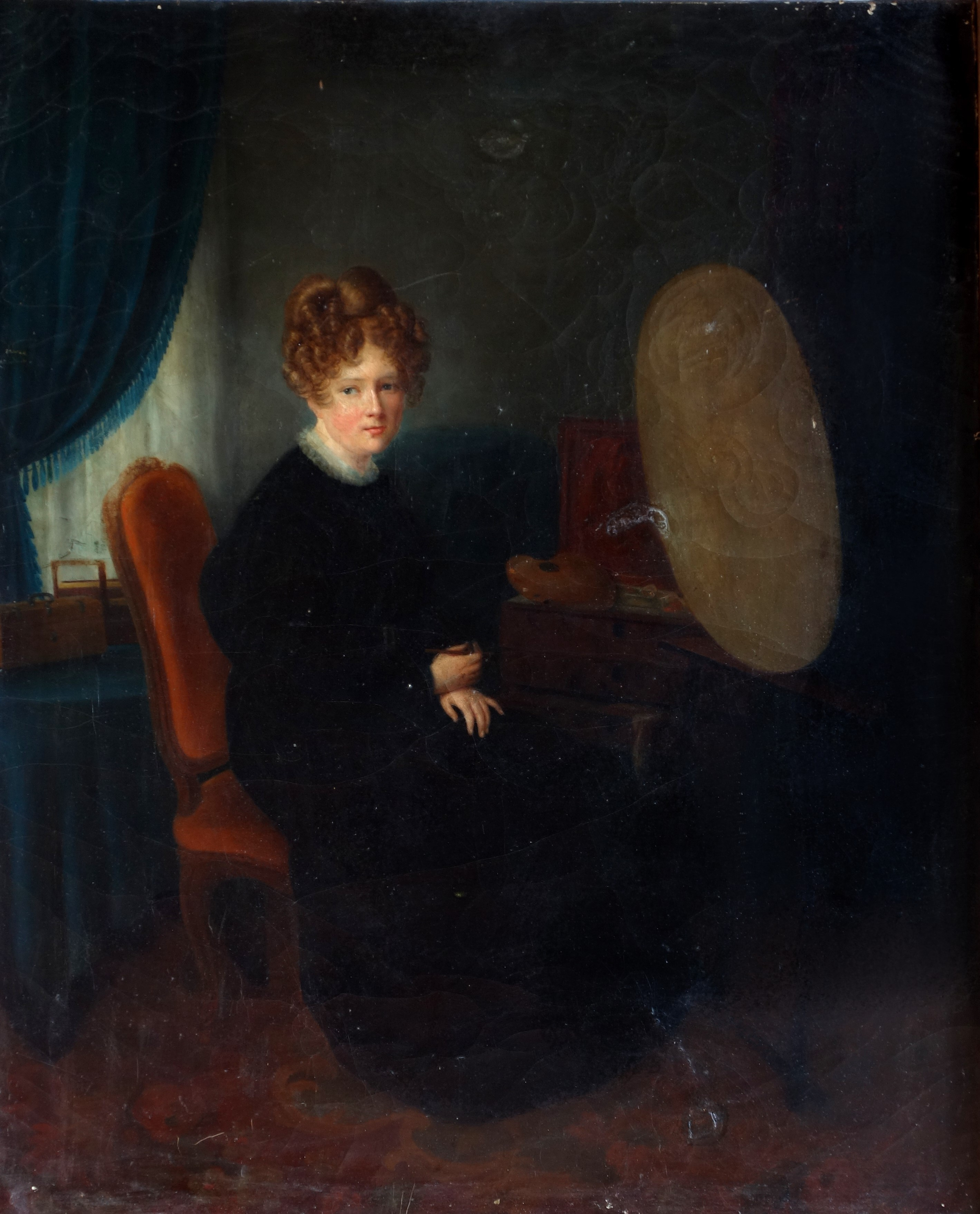
- Self-portrait of Sidonie de Polignac
- Born: c.1797 France
- Died: 22 June 1871; Château de Saint-Germain-Langot, Calvados, France
- Notable work: Portrait of Comte Alexandre de Saint-Aldegonde (1854)
- Movement: 19th-century French portraiture

Joséphine Marie Sidonie de Polignac (c.1797–1871) was a French painter and member of the prominent Polignac family.

== Life ==
Joséphine Marie Sidonie de Polignac was born around 1797, the daughter of Charles Louis Alexandre de Polignac (1762–1829), aide-de-camp to the Prince de Condé and maréchal de camp, and Christine Adolphe Adélaïde Sanguin de Livry (1763–1827), lady-in-waiting to , comtesse de Provence. She had two siblings: Héracle Charles Alexandre de Polignac (1789–1851) and Bonne Thérèse Louise Hélène Léonille de Polignac (1792–1857). Sidonie never married.

She was a devoted friend and long-time correspondent of Jenny Savalette de Lange, a French courtier and androgynous figure known for presenting as a woman while reportedly being assigned male at birth. De Polignac assisted her with housing, hosted her during travels, and arranged stays in the countryside to support her well-being.

In 1859, Sidonie de Polignac recorded in a handwritten note that seven small fragments of wallpaper in her family's possession had been removed by Caroline de Polignac from the Tour du Temple, originating from the rooms of Louis XVI, Marie-Antoinette, Louis XVII, and Madame Royale.

She died on 22 June 1871 at the Château de Saint-Germain-Langot, Calvados, at the age of 74.

== Work ==
Sidonie de Polignac painted numerous portraits of family members and contemporaries, often producing intimate and personal depictions that serve as historical testimony of her era. Known works include:

- Portrait of Comte Alexandre de Saint-Aldegonde (1854, oil on canvas)
- Portrait of Stanislas Catherine Alexis de Blocquel de Croix de Wismes (1778–1831)
- Portraits of family members, including Bonne Thérèse de Polignac and Héracle Charles Alexandre de Polignac

Sidonie remained a lifelong resident of the family estates and devoted herself primarily to painting family members and close acquaintances, leaving a cohesive record of her family and their milieu.

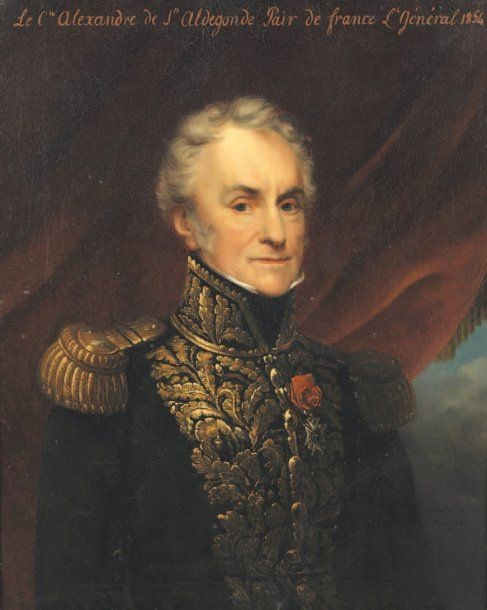
Portrait of Comte Alexandre de Sainte‑Aldegonde (1854)

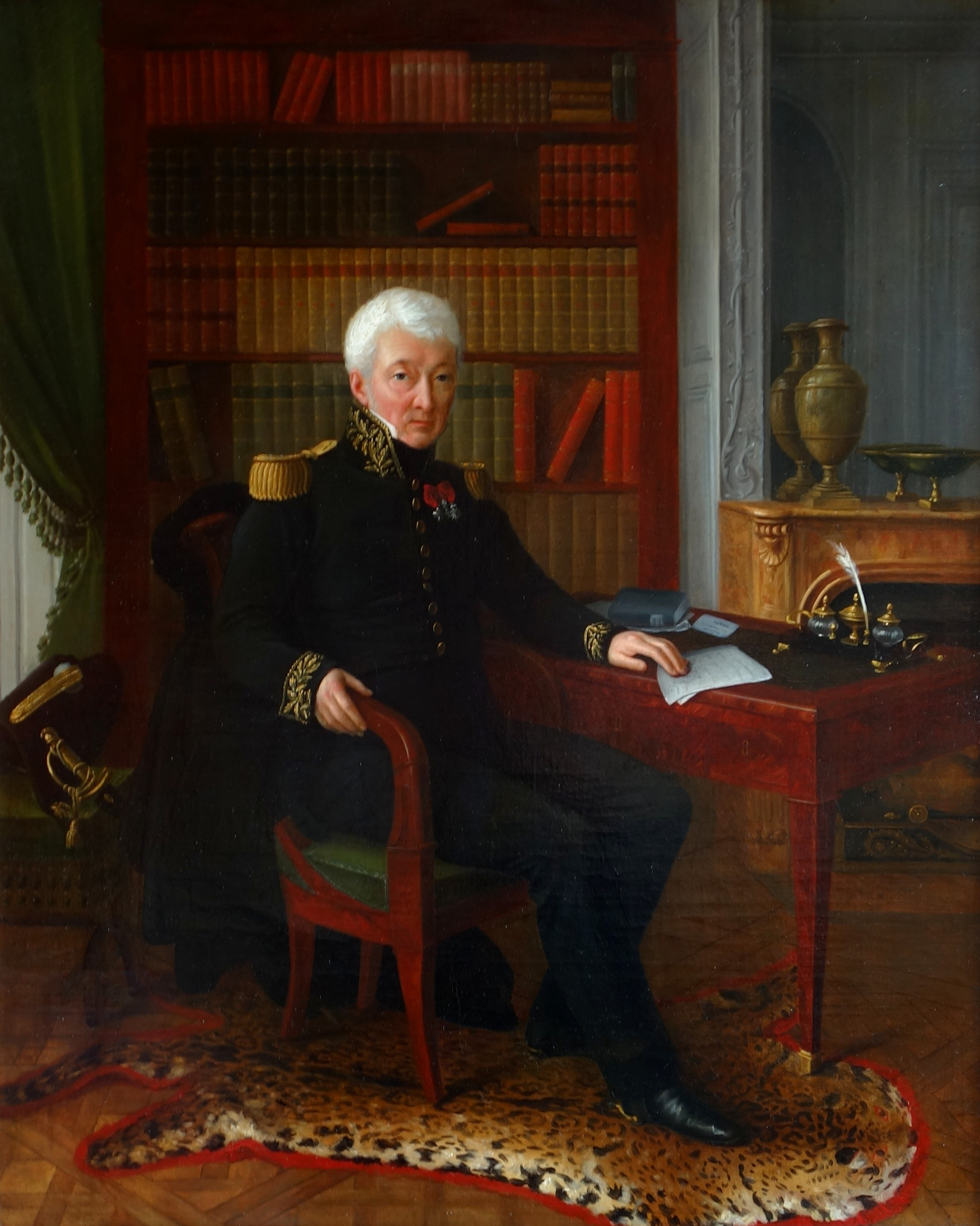
Portrait of her father, Charles Louis Alexandre de Polignac (1823)

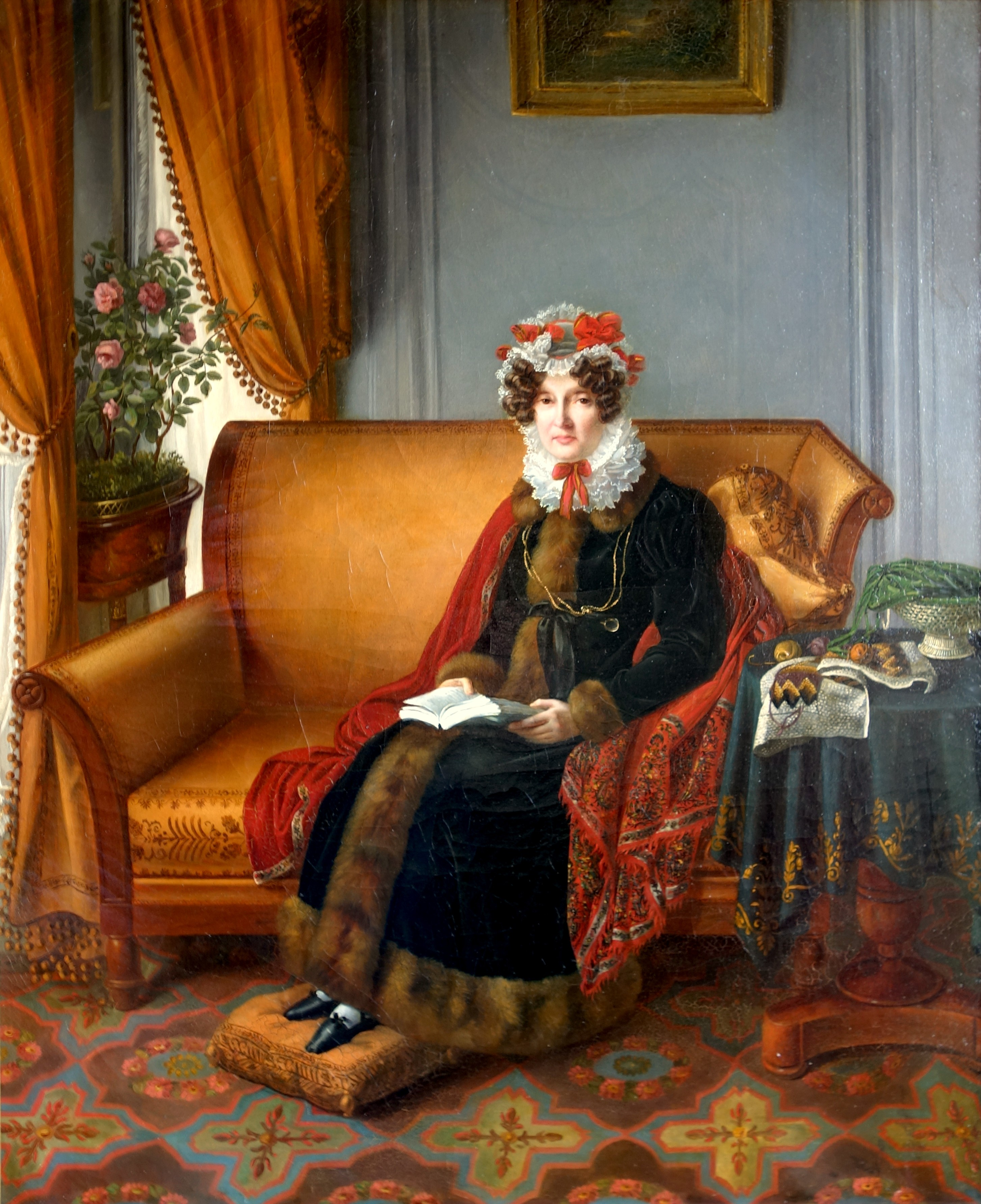
Portrait of Christine Adolphe Adélaïde Sanguin de Livry (her mother)

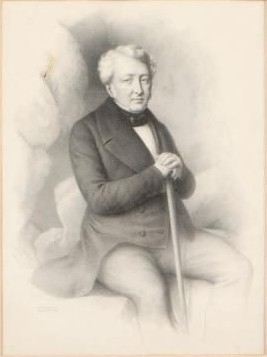
Portrait of Héracle Charles Alexandre de Polignac (her brother), lithographic copy by Beliard

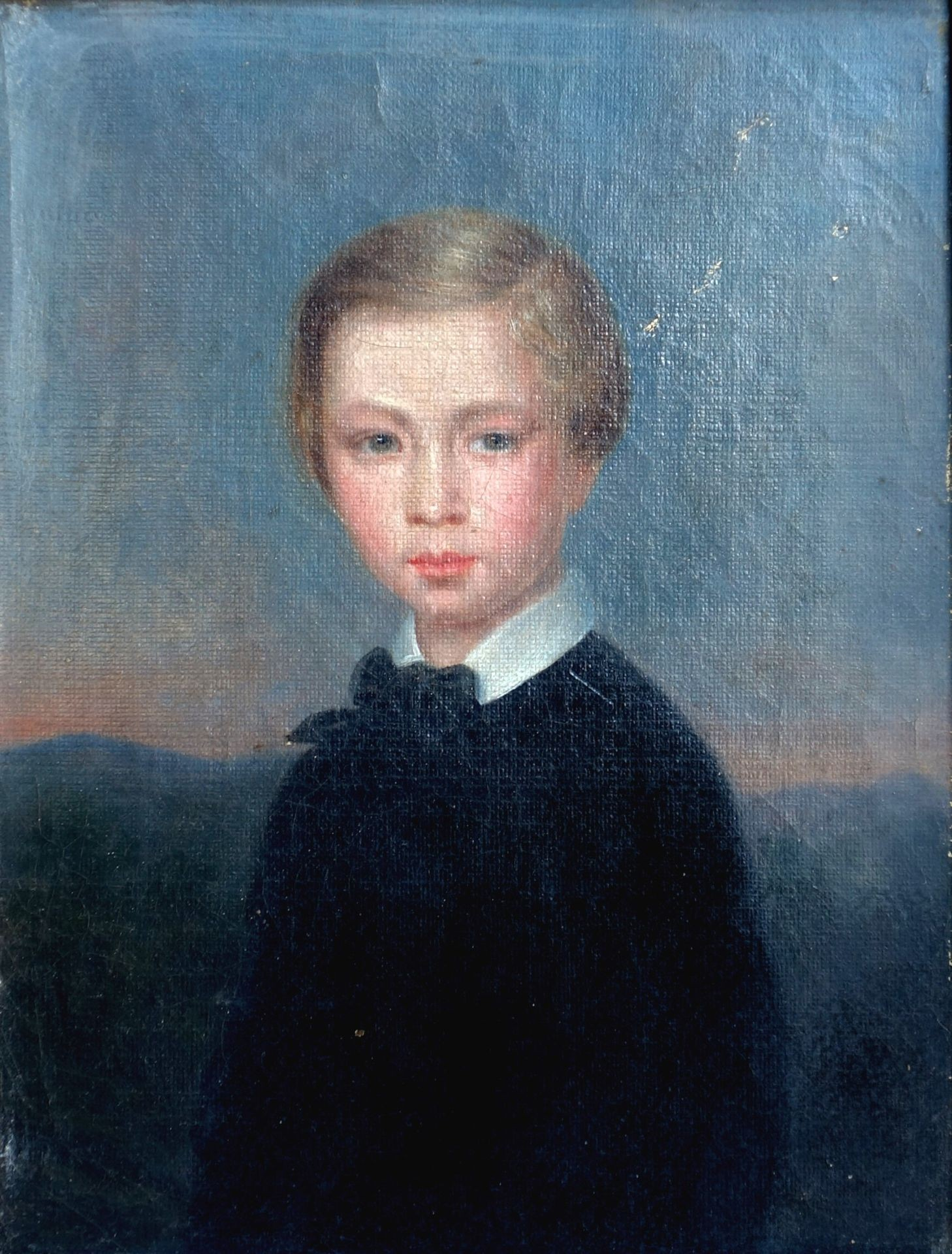
Portrait of Armel Marie Louis Armand de Wismes

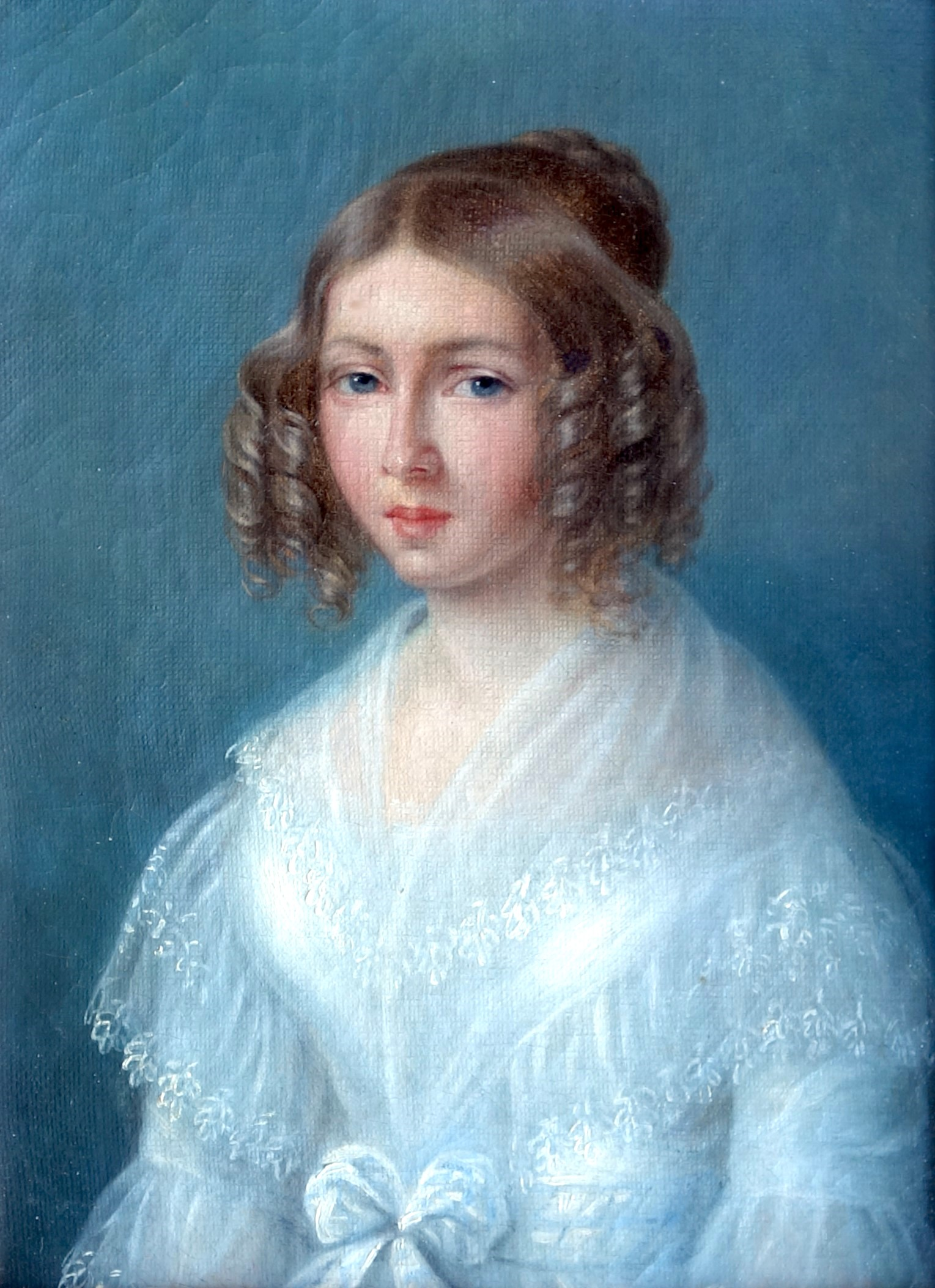
Portrait of Alix de Wismes

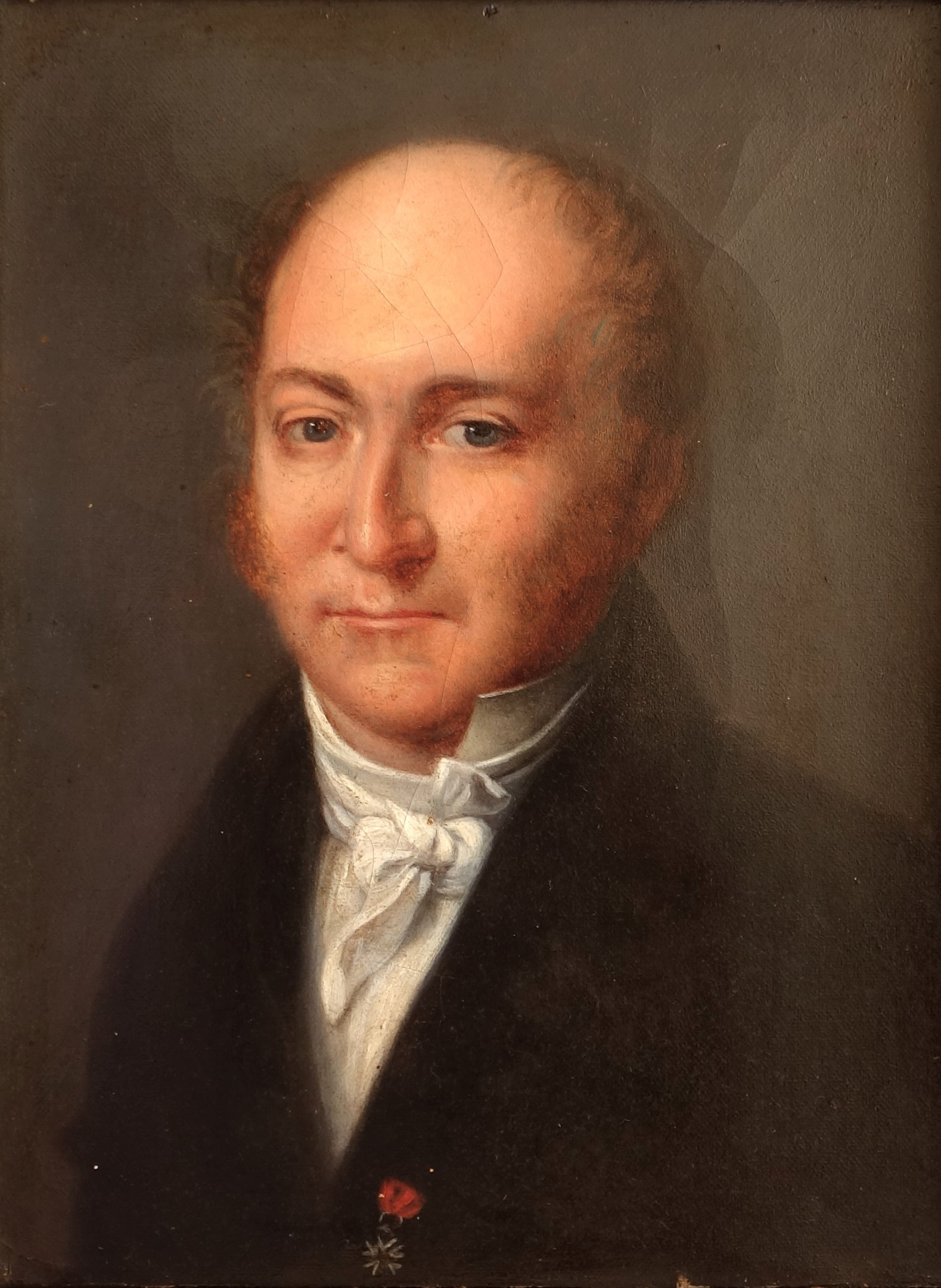
Portrait of Stanislas Catherine Alexis de Blocquel de Croix de Wismes
