= Grainville-Langannerie =

- Commune
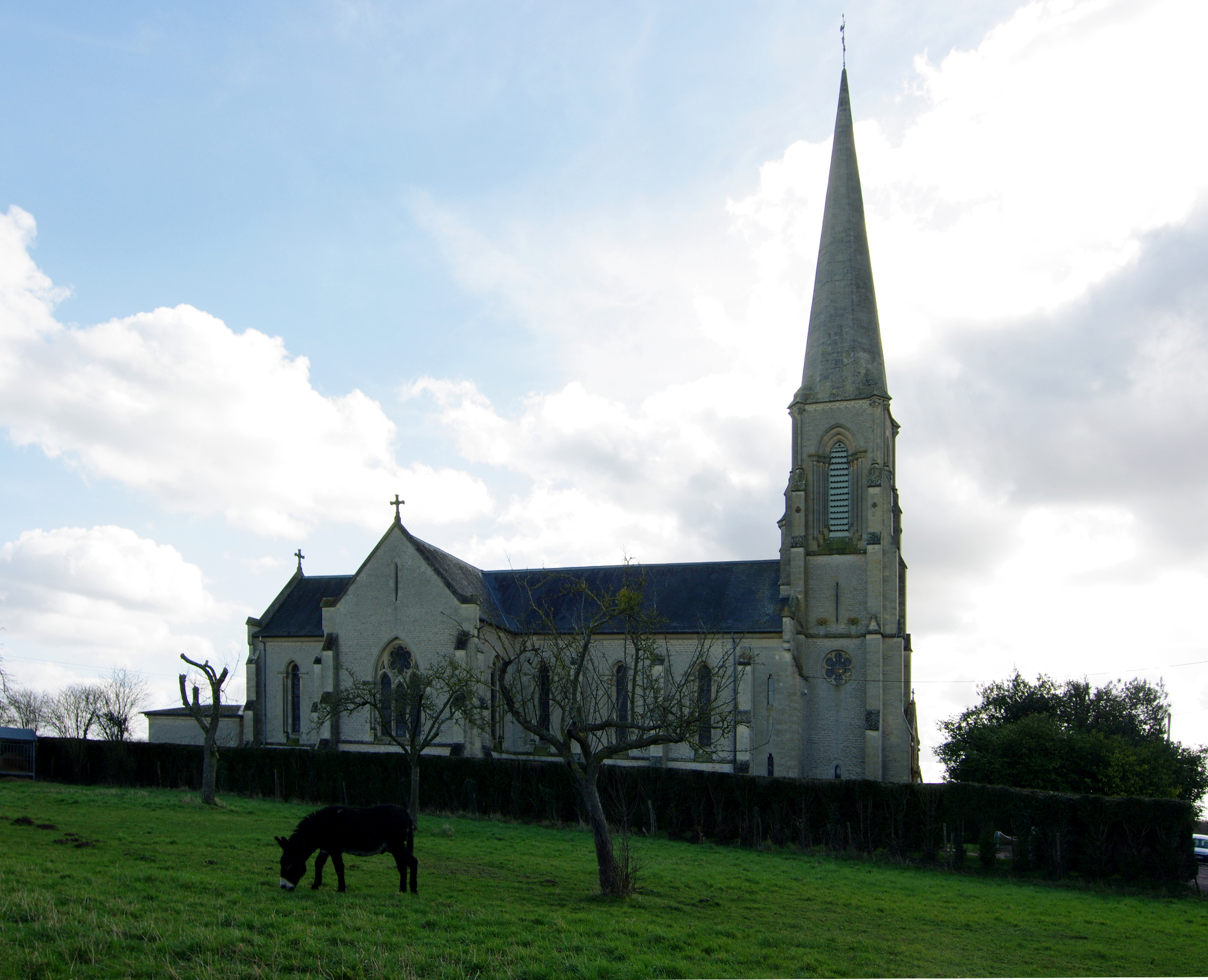
- L'église Saint Etienne
- Location of Grainville-Langannerie
- Location within France Location within Normandy
- Coordinates: 49°00′45″N 0°16′18″W
- Country: France
- Region: Normandy
- Department: Calvados
- Arrondissement: Caen
- Canton: Le Hom
- Intercommunality: Cingal-Suisse Normande

Government
  - Mayor (2020–2026): Sandrine Romagné
- Area^{1}: 5.32 km^{2} (2.05 sq mi)
- Elevation: 120 m (390 ft)
- Highest elevation: 175 m (574 ft)
- Lowest elevation: 101 m (331 ft)
- Population (2023): 812
  - Density: 153/km^{2} (395/sq mi)
- Time zone: UTC+01:00 (CET)
  - Summer (DST): UTC+02:00 (CEST)
- INSEE/Postal code: 14310 /14190
- ^{1} French Land Register data, which excludes lakes, ponds, glaciers > 1 km^{2} (0.386 sq mi or 247 acres) and river estuaries.

Grainville-Langannerie (French pronunciation: [ɡʁɛ̃vil lɑ̃ɡanʁi]) is a commune in the Calvados department in the Normandy region in northwestern France.

== Geography ==
The commune is made up of the following collection of villages and hamlets, Grainville, and Langannerie.

== Population ==
Historical population
Year	Pop.	±% p.a.
1968	531	—
1975	539	+0.21%
1982	498	−1.12%
1990	466	−0.83%
1999	522	+1.27%
2007	641	+2.60%
2012	727	+2.55%
2017	701	−0.73%
2023	812	+2.48%
Source: INSEE

== Points of Interest ==
On the outskirts of the town, in the neighbouring commune of Urville is the Cimetière Militaire Polonais de Urville, also known as the Grainville-Langannerie Polish war cemetery pays tribute to the soldiers killed in the Battle of Hill 262 during World War II.

== Twin towns – sister cities ==
Grainville-Langannerie is twinned with:

- (England) - Lapford since 1975.

== See also ==
- Grainville-sur-Odon
- Communes of the Calvados department
