= Fontaine-le-Pin =

- Commune
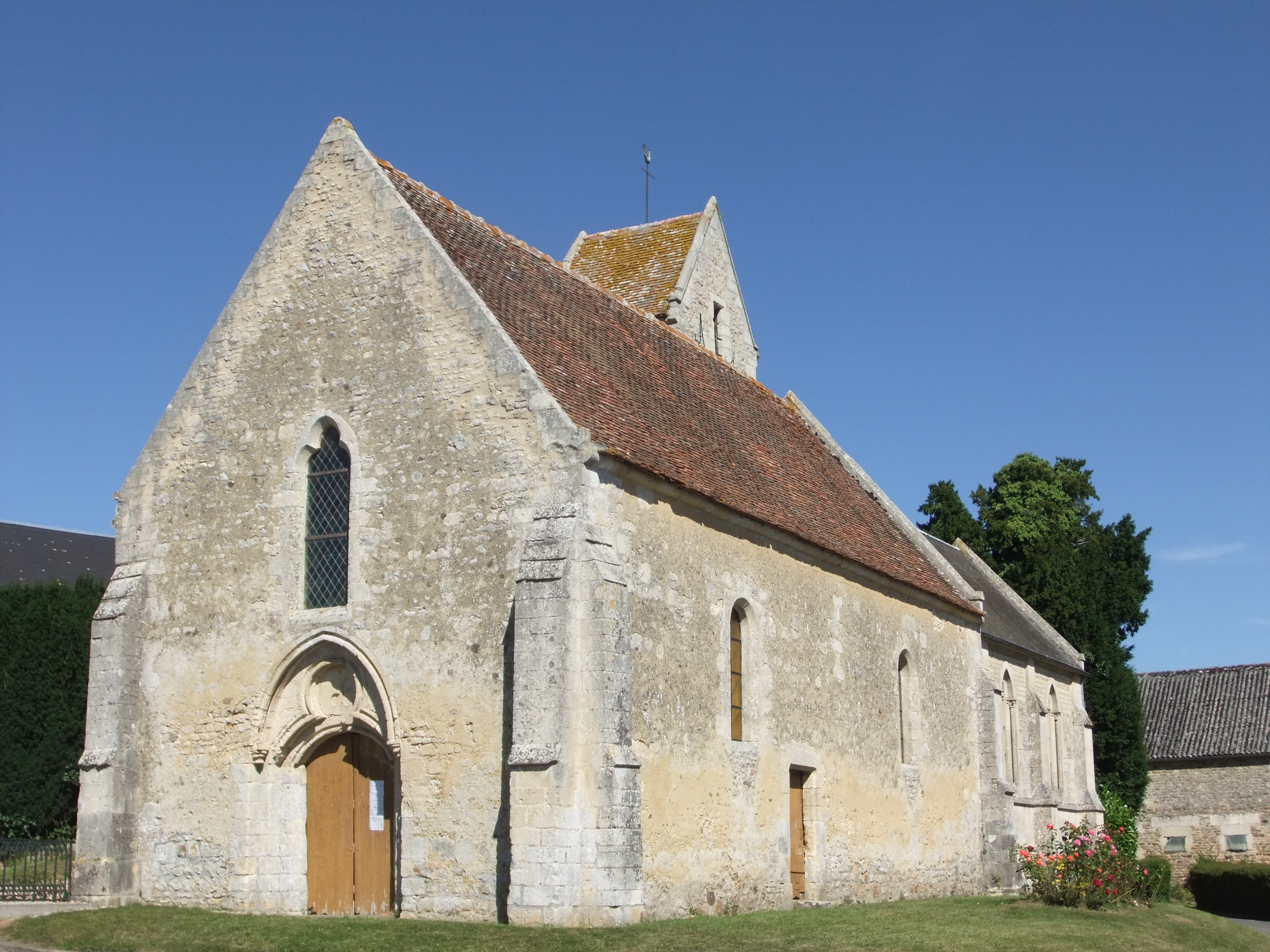
- The church of Bray

- Coat of arms
- Location of Fontaine-le-Pin
- Location within France Location within Normandy
- Coordinates: 48°58′28″N 0°16′56″W
- Country: France
- Region: Normandy
- Department: Calvados
- Arrondissement: Caen
- Canton: Falaise
- Intercommunality: Pays de Falaise

Government
  - Mayor (2020–2026): Bruno Candon
- Area^{1}: 8.54 km^{2} (3.30 sq mi)
- Elevation: 180 m (590 ft)
- Highest elevation: 203 m (666 ft)
- Lowest elevation: 108 m (354 ft)
- Population (2023): 333
  - Density: 39.0/km^{2} (101/sq mi)
- Time zone: UTC+01:00 (CET)
  - Summer (DST): UTC+02:00 (CEST)
- INSEE/Postal code: 14276 /14190
- ^{1} French Land Register data, which excludes lakes, ponds, glaciers > 1 km^{2} (0.386 sq mi or 247 acres) and river estuaries.

Fontaine-le-Pin (French pronunciation: [fɔ̃tɛn lə pɛ̃]) is a commune in the Calvados department in the Normandy region in northwestern France.

== Geography ==
The river Laize, a tributary to the Orne, flows through the commune.

== Population ==
Historical population
Year	Pop.	±% p.a.
1968	258	—
1975	258	+0.00%
1982	289	+1.63%
1990	279	−0.44%
1999	284	+0.20%
2007	323	+1.62%
2012	360	+2.19%
2017	357	−0.17%
2023	333	−1.15%
Source: INSEE

== See also ==
- Communes of the Calvados department
