= Laize =

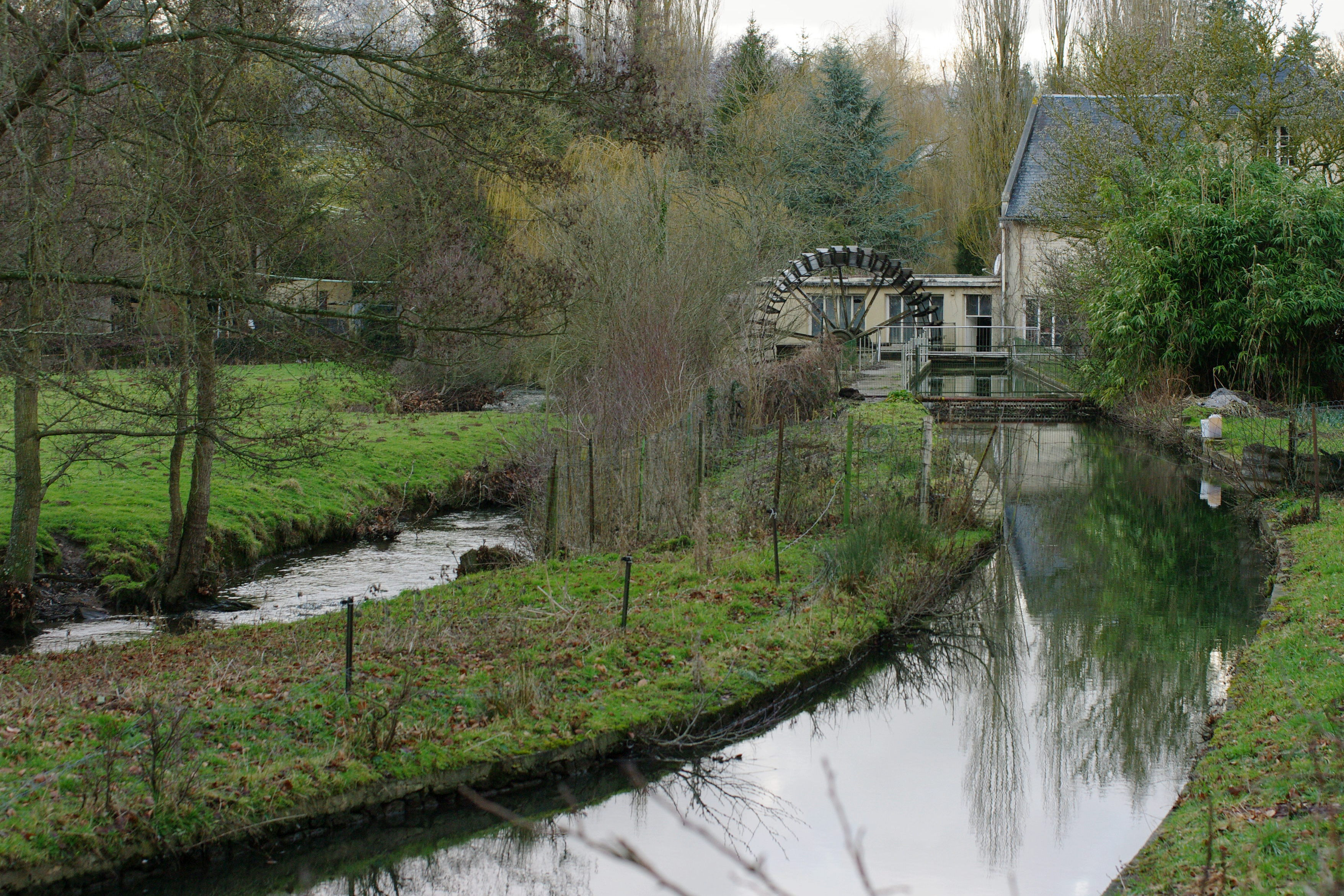
- The Laize flowing through Bretteville-sur-Laize

- Location within France Location within Normandy
- Native name: La Laize (French)

Location
- Country: France

Physical characteristics
- Source
  - location: Martigny-sur-l'Ante, Calvados
  - coordinates: 48°53′42″N 0°18′33″W
- Mouth: Orne
  - coordinates: 49°05′46″N 0°23′31″W
- Length: 31.98 km (19.87 mi)

Basin features
- Progression: Orne→ English Channel

The Laize (La French pronunciation: [lɛz]) is a river in northwestern France, crossing the department of Calvados. It is 31.98 km long. Its source is in Martigny-sur-l'Ante, and it flows into the river Orne.

The Laize flows through the area known as Suisse Normande.

== Tributaries ==
The three biggest tributaries for the Cance are:

1. Ruisseau de Bactot (9.06 km long)
2. Ruisseau du Grand Etang (8.83 km long)
3. Ruisseau de Leffard (5.78 km long)

== Communes ==
The Laize passes through the following Communes:

1. Bretteville-sur-Laize
2. Cesny-les-Sources
3. Barbery
4. Fontaine-le-Pin
5. Fresney-le-Puceux
6. Gouvix
7. Laize-Clinchamps
8. Leffard
9. Martigny-sur-l'Ante
10. May-sur-Orne
11. Moulines
12. Saint-Germain-Langot
13. Saint-Germain-le-Vasson
14. Urville
15. Ussy
