= Gouvix =

- Commune
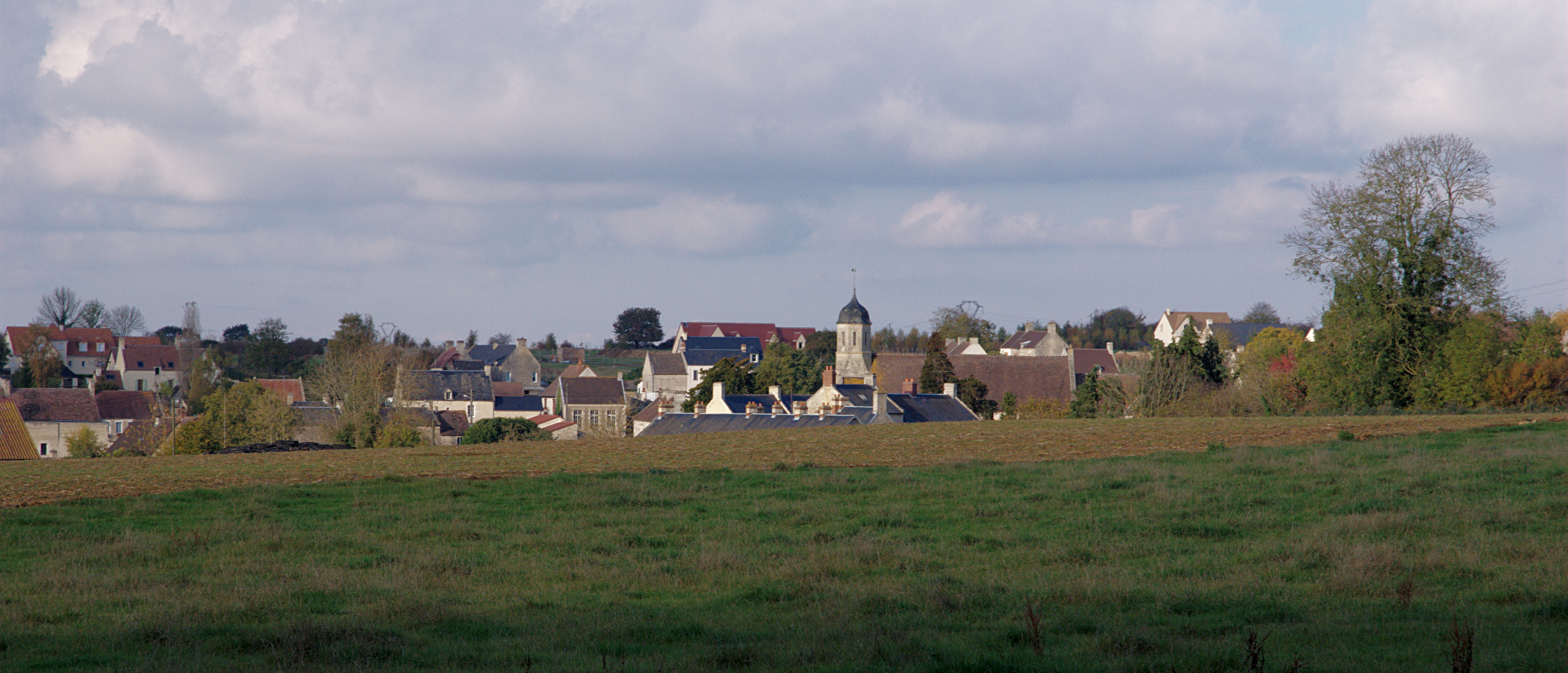
- A general view of Gouvix
- Location of Gouvix
- Location within France Location within Normandy
- Coordinates: 49°02′10″N 0°18′09″W
- Country: France
- Region: Normandy
- Department: Calvados
- Arrondissement: Caen
- Canton: Le Hom
- Intercommunality: Cingal-Suisse Normande

Government
  - Mayor (2020–2026): Jacky Lehugeur
- Area^{1}: 5.18 km^{2} (2.00 sq mi)
- Elevation: 90 m (300 ft)
- Highest elevation: 133 m (436 ft)
- Lowest elevation: 56 m (184 ft)
- Population (2023): 825
  - Density: 159/km^{2} (412/sq mi)
- Time zone: UTC+01:00 (CET)
  - Summer (DST): UTC+02:00 (CEST)
- INSEE/Postal code: 14309 /14680
- ^{1} French Land Register data, which excludes lakes, ponds, glaciers > 1 km^{2} (0.386 sq mi or 247 acres) and river estuaries.

Gouvix is a commune in the Calvados department in the Normandy region in northwestern France.

== Geography ==
The river Laize, a tributary to the Orne, flows through the commune. In addition the Ruisseau de Corneville stream is the only other water course flowing through the commune.

== Population ==
Historical population
Year	Pop.	±% p.a.
1968	789	—
1975	772	−0.31%
1982	777	+0.09%
1990	878	+1.54%
1999	819	−0.77%
2007	842	+0.35%
2012	761	−2.00%
2017	843	+2.07%
2023	825	−0.36%
Source: INSEE

== Points of Interest ==
=== National heritage sites ===
The commune has three sites listed as a Monument historique.

- Domaine du château d'Outrelaize - a sixteenth century Chateau and gardens listed as a monument in 1971.
- église Notre-Dame de Gouvix - a thirteenth century church listed as a monument in 1927.
- La Pierre Tourneresse - a Neolithic Menhir that was listed as a monument in 1936.

== See also ==
- Communes of the Calvados department
