= Grainville-Langannerie Polish war cemetery =

Cemetery in Calvados, France

- Office National des Anciens Combattants et Victimes de guerre
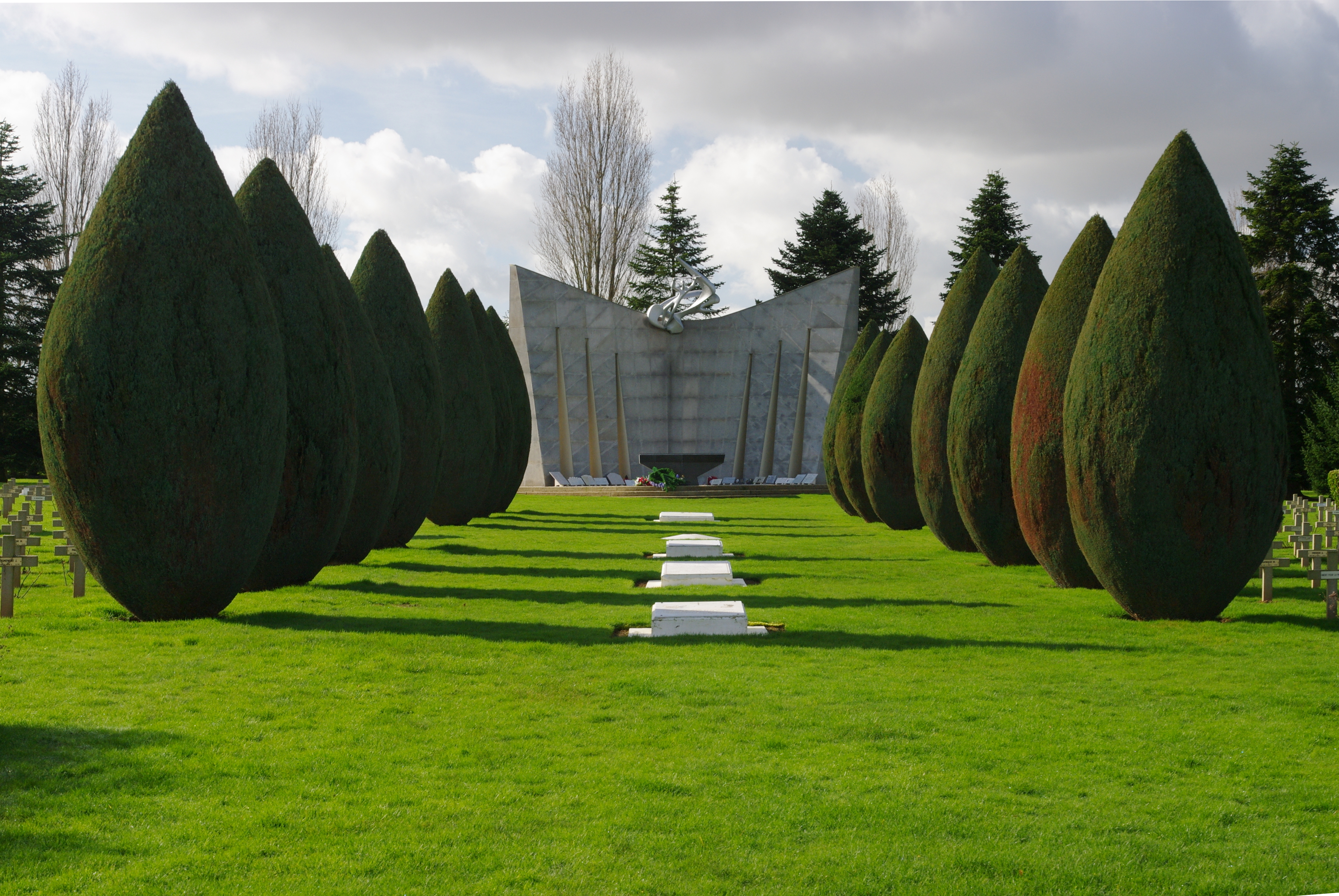
- Grainville-Langannerie Polish war cemetery
- Used for those deceased 1944
- Established: 1944
- Location: 49.0231°N 0.2707°W near Urville, Calvados, France
- Total burials: 696

Burials by nation
- Poland: 986

Burials by war
- World War II

Grainville-Langannerie Polish war cemetery (sometimes written as Urville-Langannerie) is the only Polish Second World War cemetery in France. It is located 17 km south of Caen, Normandy, and contains 696 Polish war graves. It is one of seven military cemeteries now maintained by the French state.

== History ==
The cemetery contains 615 graves of soldiers belonging to the 1st Armoured Division commanded by Major-General Stanisław Maczek. Most of the soldiers were killed during the battle to take Caen during Operation Totalize and the battles (for example, Chambois-Montcormel pocket and Hill 262) that saw the Falaise Gap closed in August 1944.

The remaining 81 graves belong mainly to re-interred Polish Armed Forces in the West soldiers who died in other parts of France, including a few from the Battle of France in 1940.

A large V-shaped monument dominates one end of the cemetery (inaugurated in August 1954), on top of which a large stylised aluminium Polish eagle sculpture sits. The sculpture was designed by Charles Gianferrari and Jacques Bertoux. Upon many of the graves small tokens are left, including a considerable number of rosary beads. The Federation of French War Veterans maintains the cemetery. The cemetery was inaugurated in October 1946.

The entrance gates feature the insignia of the Polish 1st Armoured Division, the headgear of the Polish hussars. There is also a small building containing the register of the graves.

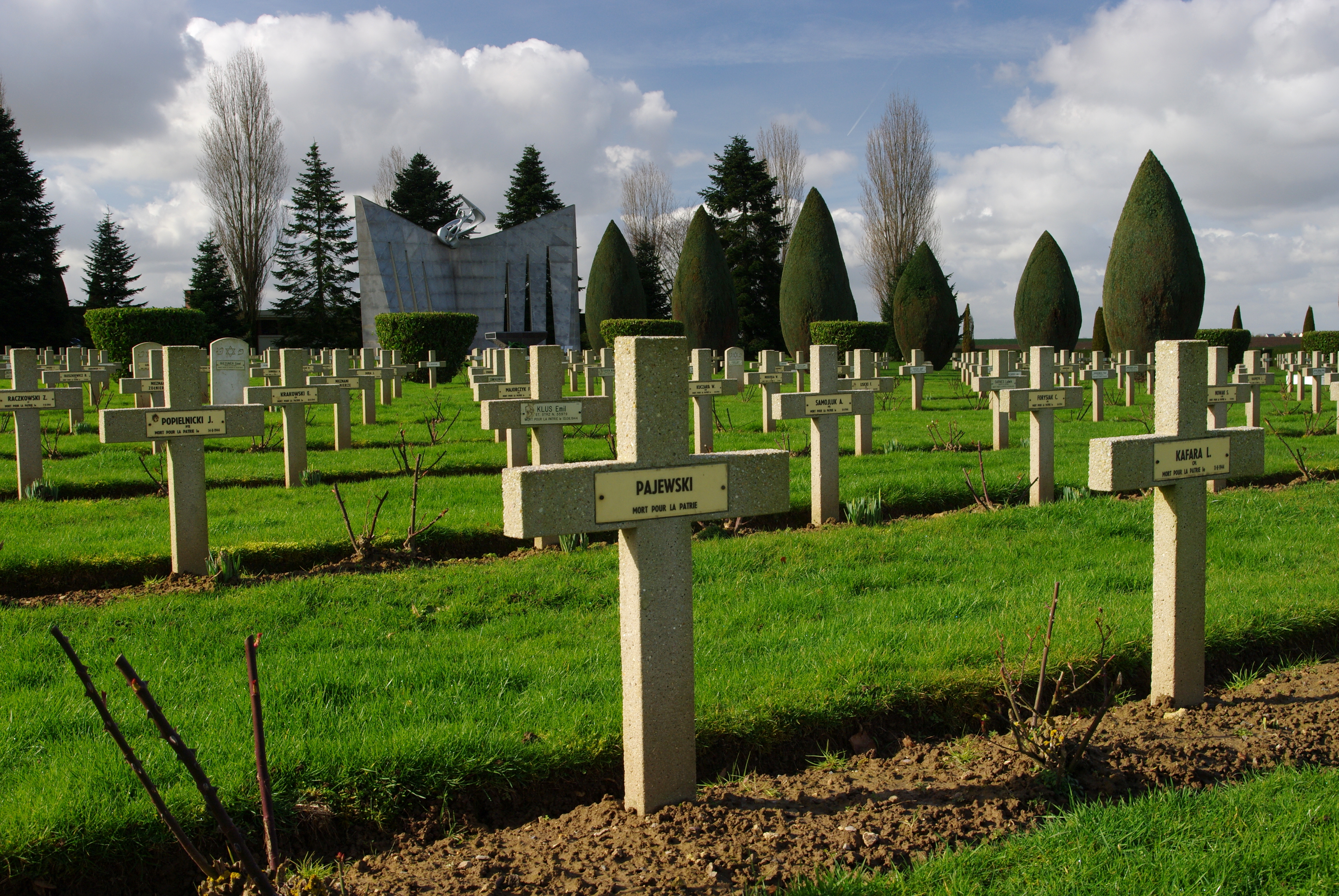
Polish graves in the cemetery

== Location ==
The cemetery is located in the commune of Urville, Calvados near the border with Grainville-Langannerie, just off the N158, about half-way from Caen to Falaise.

== See also ==
- American Battle Monuments Commission
- German War Graves Commission
- List of military cemeteries in Normandy
