= Bretteville-sur-Laize =

- Commune
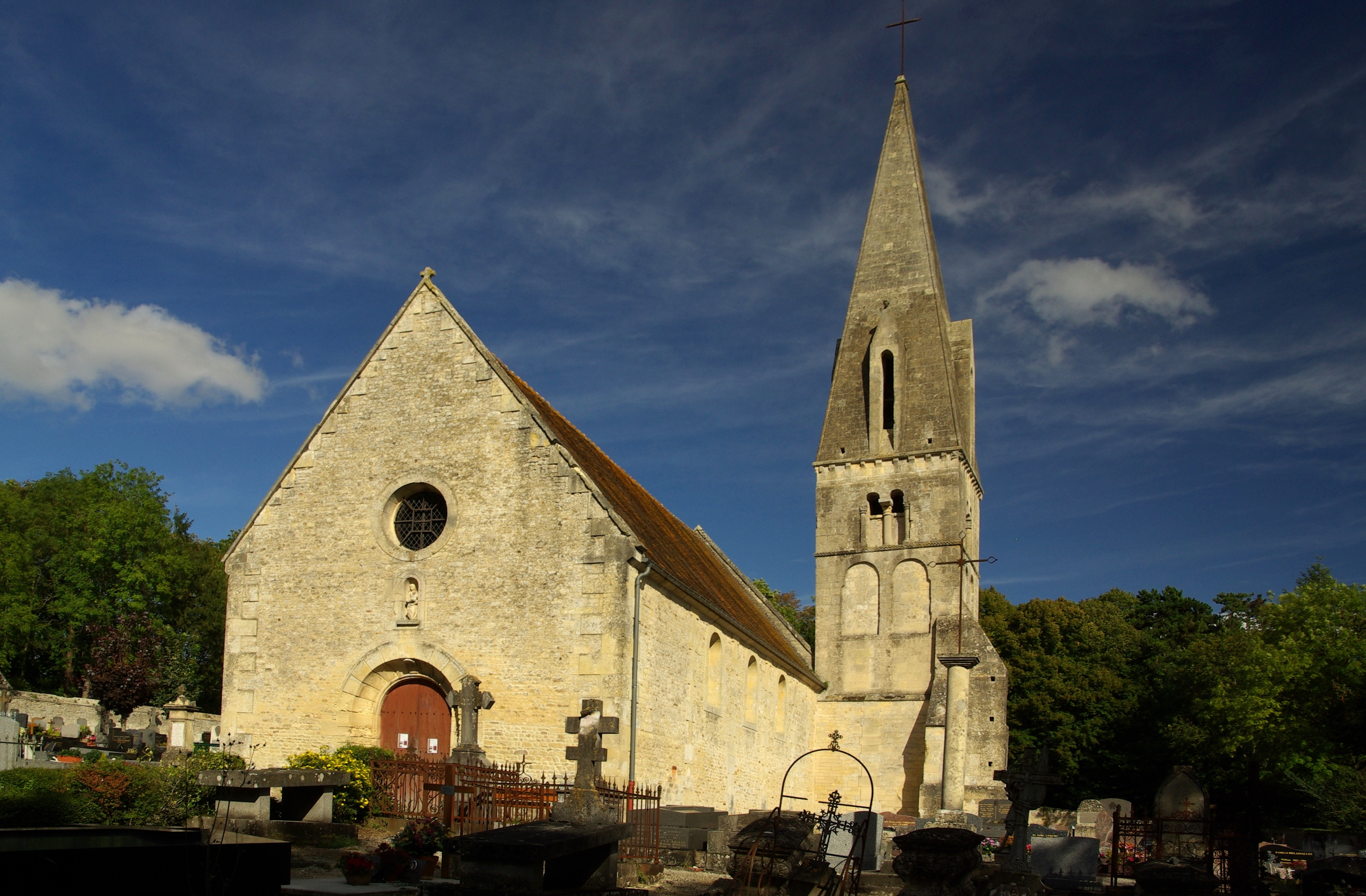
- The church in Bretteville-sur-Laize

- Coat of arms
- Location of Bretteville-sur-Laize
- Location within France Location within Normandy
- Coordinates: 49°02′45″N 0°19′26″W
- Country: France
- Region: Normandy
- Department: Calvados
- Arrondissement: Caen
- Canton: Le Hom
- Intercommunality: Cingal-Suisse Normande

Government
  - Mayor (2020–2026): Bruno François
- Area^{1}: 9.68 km^{2} (3.74 sq mi)
- Elevation: 54 m (177 ft)
- Highest elevation: 130 m (430 ft)
- Lowest elevation: 38 m (125 ft)
- Population (2023): 1,910
  - Density: 197/km^{2} (511/sq mi)
- Time zone: UTC+01:00 (CET)
  - Summer (DST): UTC+02:00 (CEST)
- INSEE/Postal code: 14100 /14680
- ^{1} French Land Register data, which excludes lakes, ponds, glaciers > 1 km^{2} (0.386 sq mi or 247 acres) and river estuaries.

Bretteville-sur-Laize (French pronunciation: [bʁɛtvil syʁ lɛz]) is a commune in the Calvados department in the Normandy region in northwestern France.

The scene of heavy fighting following the Normandy landings, much of the town is of post-World War II construction.

== Geography ==
The commune is made up of the following collection of villages and hamlets, Jacob Mesnil, Quilly, Le Beffeux, Les Écluses, L'Abbaye and Bretteville-sur-Laize.

The Commune with another 20 communes shares part of a 2,115 hectare, Natura 2000 conservation area, called the Vallée de l'Orne et ses affluents.

The river Laize, a tributary to the Orne, flows through the commune. In addition two streams also flow through the commune the Ruisseau de Corneville and the Ruisseau du Val Clair.

== Population ==
Historical population
| Year | Pop. | ±% p.a. |
|---|---|---|
| 1968 | 1,323 | — |
| 1975 | 1,299 | −0.26% |
| 1982 | 1,400 | +1.08% |
| 1990 | 1,341 | −0.54% |
| 1999 | 1,504 | +1.28% |
| 2007 | 1,558 | +0.44% |
| 2012 | 1,692 | +1.66% |
| 2017 | 1,876 | +2.09% |
| 2023 | 1,910 | +0.30% |
Source: INSEE

== Points of Interest ==
=== National Heritage sites ===
The Commune has three buildings and areas listed as a Monument historique

- Eglise Notre-Dame de Quilly an eleventh century church listed as a monument in 1921.
- Ancien manoir de Quilly a former manor house from the sixteenth century listed as a monument in 1922.
- Former Notre-Dame de Barbery Abbey founded in 1176 by Robert Marmion that was classed as a Monument historique in 2005. The abbey grounds are shared with the neighbouring commune of Barbery.

== Notable people ==
- Xavier Deluc - (Born 1958) is an Actor, director and scriptwriter who was raised within this commune.

== International relations ==
Bretteville-sur-Laize is twinned with:

- Maßbach, Germany (since 1989)
- Chagford, England (since 1975, but twinning activity lapsed in the 1990s)

== See also ==
- Communes of the Calvados department
- Bretteville-sur-Laize Canadian War Cemetery
- Château des Riffets
