= Château des Riffets =

Château in Calvados, Normandy, France

Coordinates: 49.0505°N 0.3224°W

The Château des Riffets is a château in the village of Bretteville-sur-Laize, Calvados department, Normandy, northwestern France.

== History ==
The château was built around 1880; the nearby farm dates from the 18th century. It was built on the ruins of a coaching inn used by William the Conqueror in the 11th century. During the Second World War, German troops were stationed there, and during the D-Day landings of June 1944, the château housed a German bomb dump. The château has been partially destroyed at least 3 times: once in the 13th century, again during the French Revolution and most recently by accidental bombing during the Second World War, as when the USAAF attempted to bomb the bomb dump for the first time, they missed it and hit the château instead.

The château is now used as a bed and breakfast.
