= Leffard =

- Commune
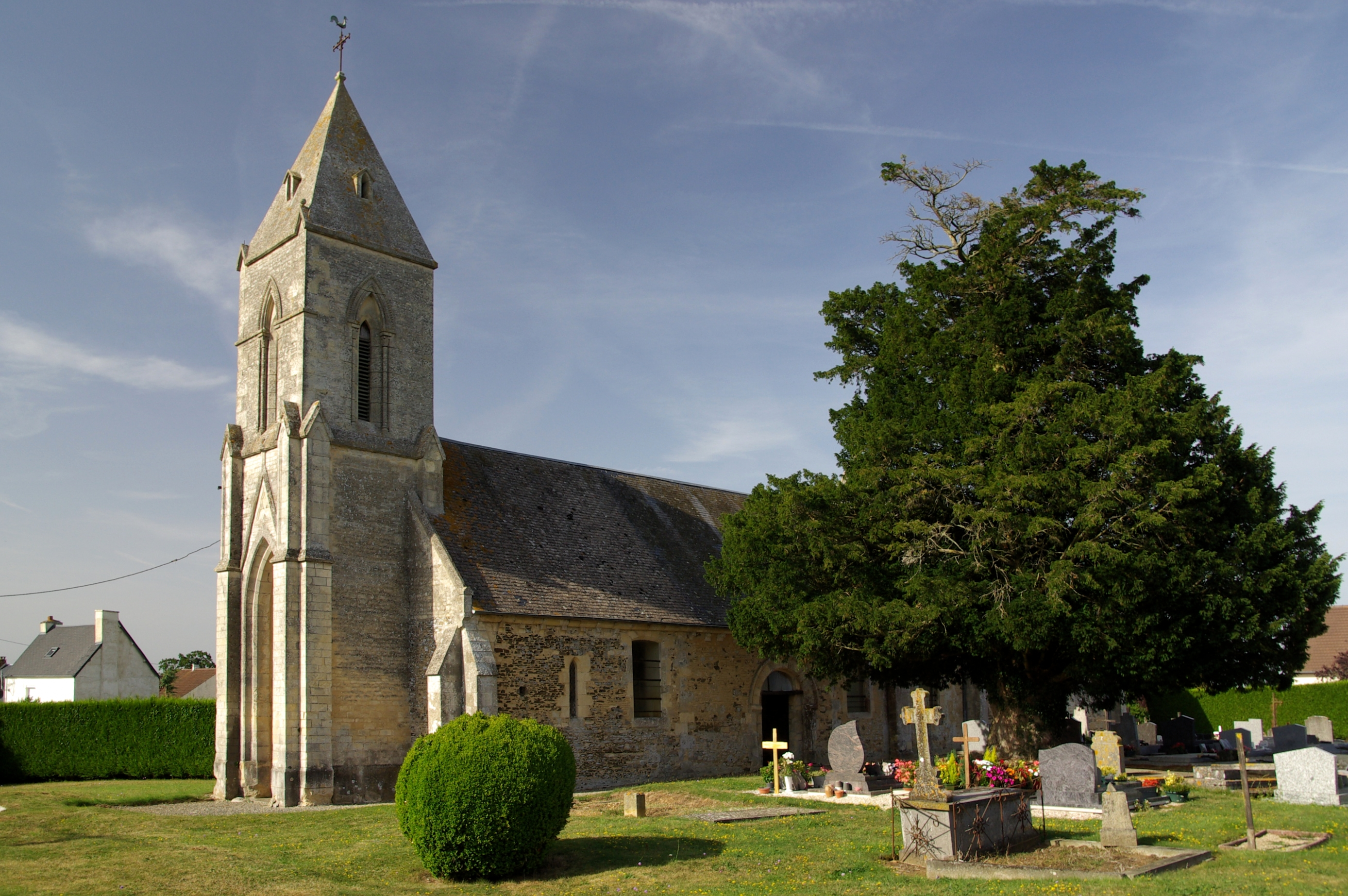
- The church in Leffard
- Location of Leffard
- Location within France Location within Normandy
- Coordinates: 48°55′05″N 0°18′10″W
- Country: France
- Region: Normandy
- Department: Calvados
- Arrondissement: Caen
- Canton: Falaise
- Intercommunality: Pays de Falaise

Government
  - Mayor (2020–2026): Jean-Claude Meurgey
- Area^{1}: 6.89 km^{2} (2.66 sq mi)
- Elevation: 210 m (690 ft)
- Highest elevation: 228 m (748 ft)
- Lowest elevation: 160 m (520 ft)
- Population (2023): 204
  - Density: 29.6/km^{2} (76.7/sq mi)
- Time zone: UTC+01:00 (CET)
  - Summer (DST): UTC+02:00 (CEST)
- INSEE/Postal code: 14360 /14700
- ^{1} French Land Register data, which excludes lakes, ponds, glaciers > 1 km^{2} (0.386 sq mi or 247 acres) and river estuaries.

Leffard (French pronunciation: [lɛfaʁ]) is a commune in the Calvados department in the Normandy region in northwestern France.

== Geography ==
The commune is part of the area known as Suisse Normande.

The commune is made up of the following collection of villages and hamlets, La Barberie, La Cocquerie, Les Champs Noyers, Le Frot, La Trébaudière and Leffard.

The river Laize runs through the commune, along with three streams The Leffard, la Moussaye and The Etre.

== Population ==
Historical population
Year	Pop.	±% p.a.
1968	147	—
1975	156	+0.85%
1982	180	+2.07%
1990	183	+0.21%
1999	168	−0.95%
2007	157	−0.84%
2012	191	+4.00%
2017	204	+1.33%
2023	204	+0.00%
Source: INSEE

== See also ==
- Communes of the Calvados department
