= Martigny-sur-l'Ante =

- Commune
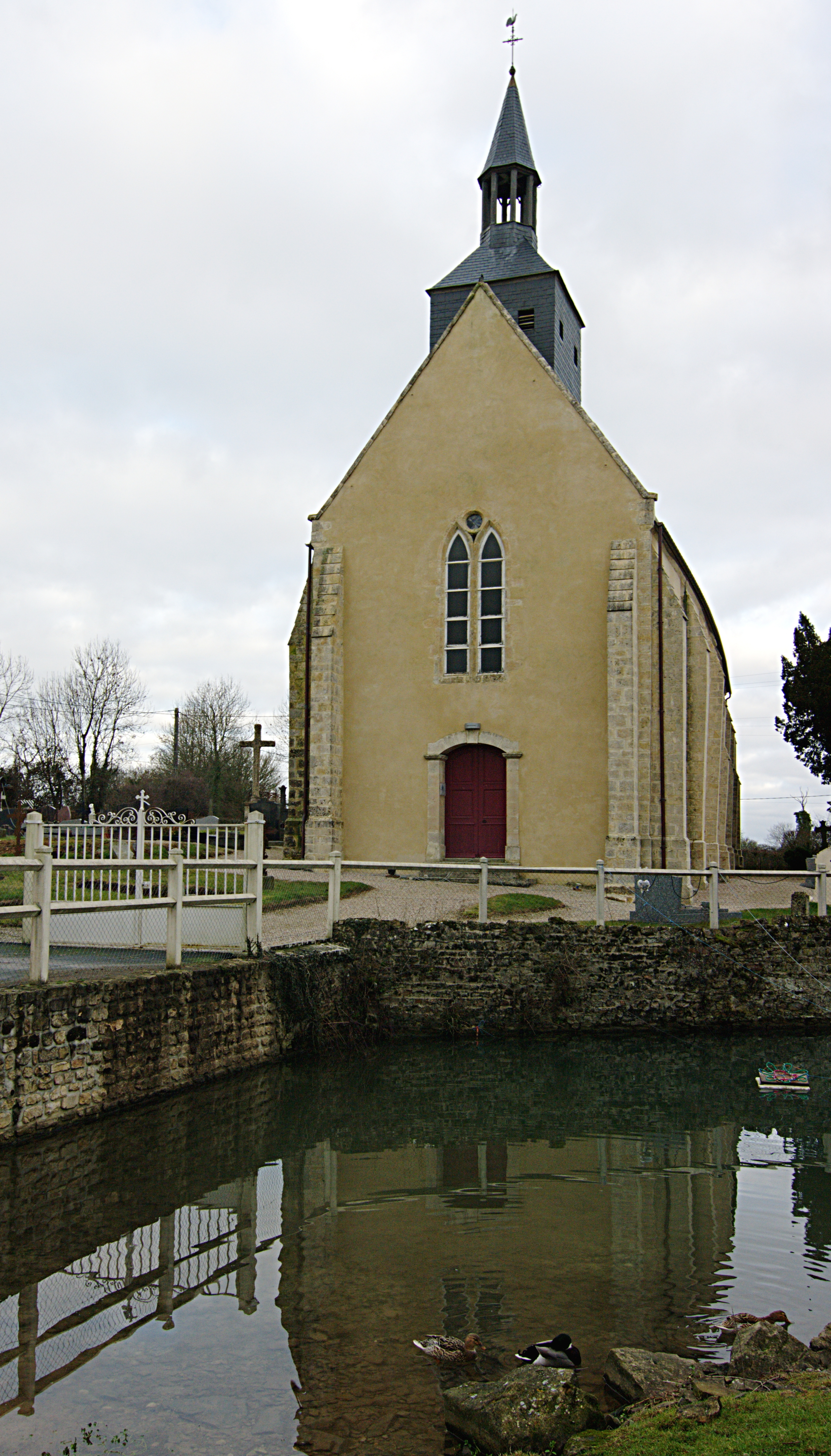
- The church in Martigny-sur-l'Ante
- Location of Martigny-sur-l'Ante
- Location within France Location within Normandy
- Coordinates: 48°53′09″N 0°17′06″W
- Country: France
- Region: Normandy
- Department: Calvados
- Arrondissement: Caen
- Canton: Falaise
- Intercommunality: Pays de Falaise

Government
  - Mayor (2020–2026): Alain Lefèvre
- Area^{1}: 9.34 km^{2} (3.61 sq mi)
- Elevation: 220 m (720 ft)
- Highest elevation: 248 m (814 ft)
- Lowest elevation: 183 m (600 ft)
- Population (2023): 316
  - Density: 33.8/km^{2} (87.6/sq mi)
- Time zone: UTC+01:00 (CET)
  - Summer (DST): UTC+02:00 (CEST)
- INSEE/Postal code: 14405 /14700
- ^{1} French Land Register data, which excludes lakes, ponds, glaciers > 1 km^{2} (0.386 sq mi or 247 acres) and river estuaries.

Martigny-sur-l'Ante (French pronunciation: [maʁtiɲi syʁ lɑ̃t]) is a commune in the Calvados department in the Normandy region in northwestern France.

== Geography ==
The commune is part of the area known as Suisse Normande.

The commune is made up of the following collection of villages and hamlets, La Croix, Les Prés, La Champinière, La Corbetière, La Gare, Quinquefougère and Martigny-sur-l'Ante.

The source of the river Ante a tributary of the Dives, is in the commune. Also the source of the river Laize, a tributary to the Orne, is in the commune.

== Population ==
Historical population
Year	Pop.	±% p.a.
1968	206	—
1975	185	−1.52%
1982	253	+4.57%
1990	288	+1.63%
1999	293	+0.19%
2007	323	+1.23%
2012	320	−0.19%
2017	319	−0.06%
2023	316	−0.16%
Source: INSEE

== See also ==
- Communes of the Calvados department
