= Saint-Germain-Langot =

- Commune
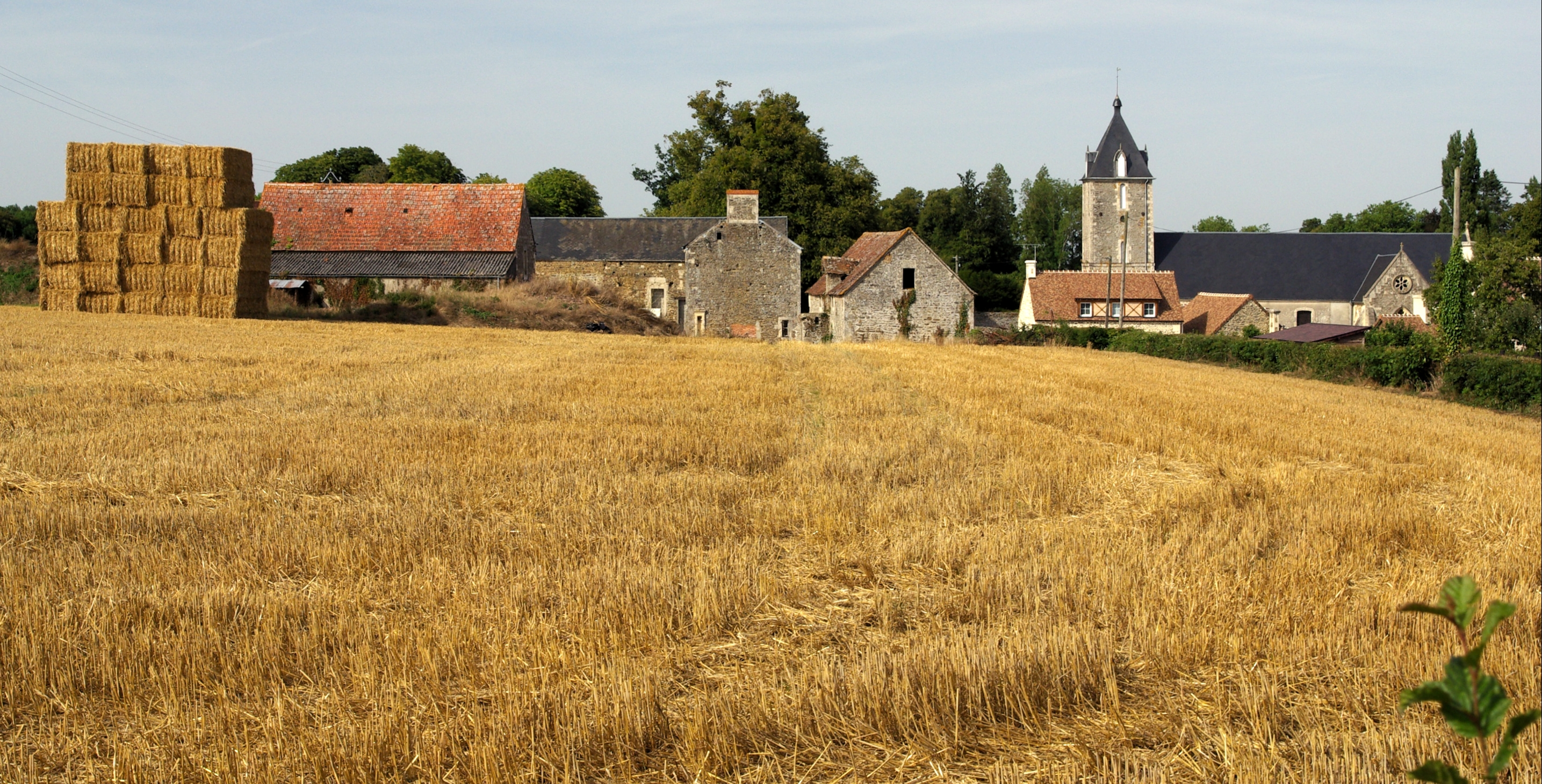
- A general view of Saint-Germain-Langot
- Location of Saint-Germain-Langot
- Location within France Location within Normandy
- Coordinates: 48°55′23″N 0°19′20″W
- Country: France
- Region: Normandy
- Department: Calvados
- Arrondissement: Caen
- Canton: Falaise
- Intercommunality: Pays de Falaise

Government
  - Mayor (2020–2026): Jacqueline Coudière
- Area^{1}: 10.35 km^{2} (4.00 sq mi)
- Elevation: 180 m (590 ft)
- Highest elevation: 239 m (784 ft)
- Lowest elevation: 135 m (443 ft)
- Population (2023): 350
  - Density: 34/km^{2} (88/sq mi)
- Time zone: UTC+01:00 (CET)
  - Summer (DST): UTC+02:00 (CEST)
- INSEE/Postal code: 14588 /14700
- ^{1} French Land Register data, which excludes lakes, ponds, glaciers > 1 km^{2} (0.386 sq mi or 247 acres) and river estuaries.

Saint-Germain-Langot (French pronunciation: [sɛ̃ ʒɛʁmɛ̃ lɑ̃ɡo]) is a commune in the Calvados department in the Normandy region in northwestern France.

== Geography ==
The commune is part of the area known as Suisse Normande.

The commune is made up of the following collection of villages and hamlets, La Pierre Affileresse, Le Mesnil, Ronthaunay and Saint-Germain-Langot.

The river Laize runs through the commune, along with six streams The Langot, The Trois Minettes, The Grand Etang, The Leffard, La Rue and The Etre.

== Population ==
Historical population
Year	Pop.	±% p.a.
1968	268	—
1975	232	−2.04%
1982	243	+0.66%
1990	246	+0.15%
1999	271	+1.08%
2007	294	+1.02%
2012	319	+1.65%
2017	319	+0.00%
2023	350	+1.56%
Source: INSEE

== See also ==
- Communes of the Calvados department
