= Moulines, Calvados =

Moulines
- Commune
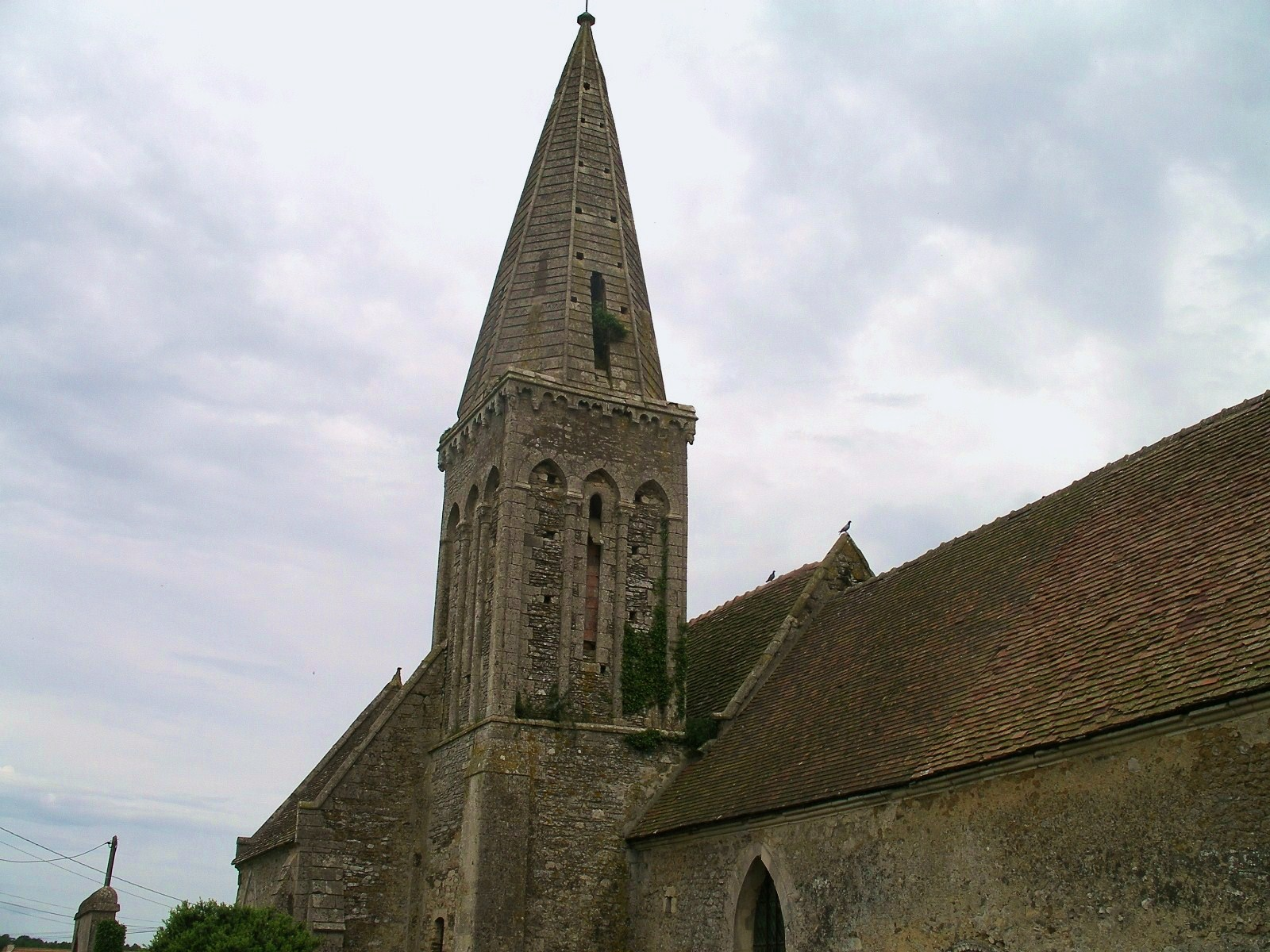
- The church in Moulines
- Location of Moulines
- Location within France Location within Normandy
- Coordinates: 48°59′18″N 0°20′11″W
- Country: France
- Region: Normandy
- Department: Calvados
- Arrondissement: Caen
- Canton: Le Hom
- Intercommunality: Cingal-Suisse Normande

Government
  - Mayor (2020–2026): Marie-Estelle Brière
- Area^{1}: 9.38 km^{2} (3.62 sq mi)
- Elevation: 120 m (390 ft)
- Highest elevation: 192 m (630 ft)
- Lowest elevation: 95 m (312 ft)
- Population (2023): 272
  - Density: 29.0/km^{2} (75.1/sq mi)
- Time zone: UTC+01:00 (CET)
  - Summer (DST): UTC+02:00 (CEST)
- INSEE/Postal code: 14455 /14220
- ^{1} French Land Register data, which excludes lakes, ponds, glaciers > 1 km^{2} (0.386 sq mi or 247 acres) and river estuaries.

Moulines (French pronunciation: [mulin]) is a commune in the Calvados department in the Normandy region in northwestern France.

== Geography ==
The river Laize, a tributary to the Orne, flows through the commune.

== Population ==
Historical population
Year	Pop.	±% p.a.
1968	151	—
1975	168	+1.54%
1982	193	+2.00%
1990	216	+1.42%
1999	225	+0.45%
2007	251	+1.38%
2012	250	−0.08%
2017	303	+3.92%
2023	272	−1.78%
Source: INSEE

== See also ==
- Communes of the Calvados department
