= Urville, Calvados =

Urville
- Commune
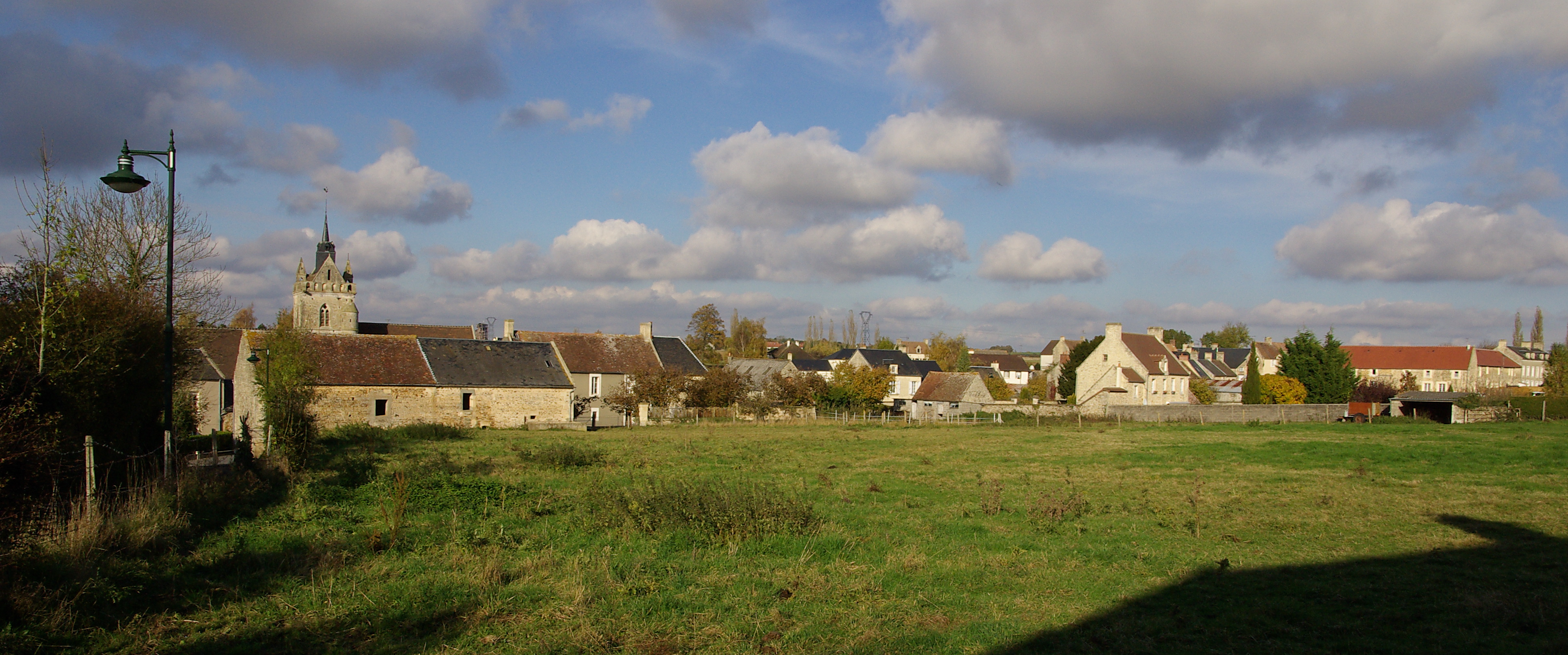
- A general view of Urville
- Location of Urville
- Location within France Location within Normandy
- Coordinates: 49°01′35″N 0°17′46″W
- Country: France
- Region: Normandy
- Department: Calvados
- Arrondissement: Caen
- Canton: Le Hom
- Intercommunality: Cingal-Suisse Normande

Government
  - Mayor (2020–2026): Patrick Morel
- Area^{1}: 6.02 km^{2} (2.32 sq mi)
- Elevation: 100 m (330 ft)
- Highest elevation: 136 m (446 ft)
- Lowest elevation: 66 m (217 ft)
- Population (2023): 779
  - Density: 129/km^{2} (335/sq mi)
- Time zone: UTC+01:00 (CET)
  - Summer (DST): UTC+02:00 (CEST)
- INSEE/Postal code: 14719 /14190
- ^{1} French Land Register data, which excludes lakes, ponds, glaciers > 1 km^{2} (0.386 sq mi or 247 acres) and river estuaries.

Urville (French pronunciation: [yʁvil]) is a commune in the Calvados department and Normandy region of north-western France.

Iron mining was an important industry in the village until 1989. The village was at the head of a mineral railway linking the iron mines to the SMN steel mills.

== Geography ==
The commune is made up of the following collection of villages and hamlets, La Moinerie and Urville.

The river Laize, a tributary to the Orne, flows through the commune.

== Population ==
Historical population
Year	Pop.	±% p.a.
1968	484	—
1975	501	+0.49%
1982	543	+1.16%
1990	519	−0.56%
1999	478	−0.91%
2007	457	−0.56%
2012	559	+4.11%
2017	671	+3.72%
2023	779	+2.52%
Source: INSEE

== Points of Interest ==
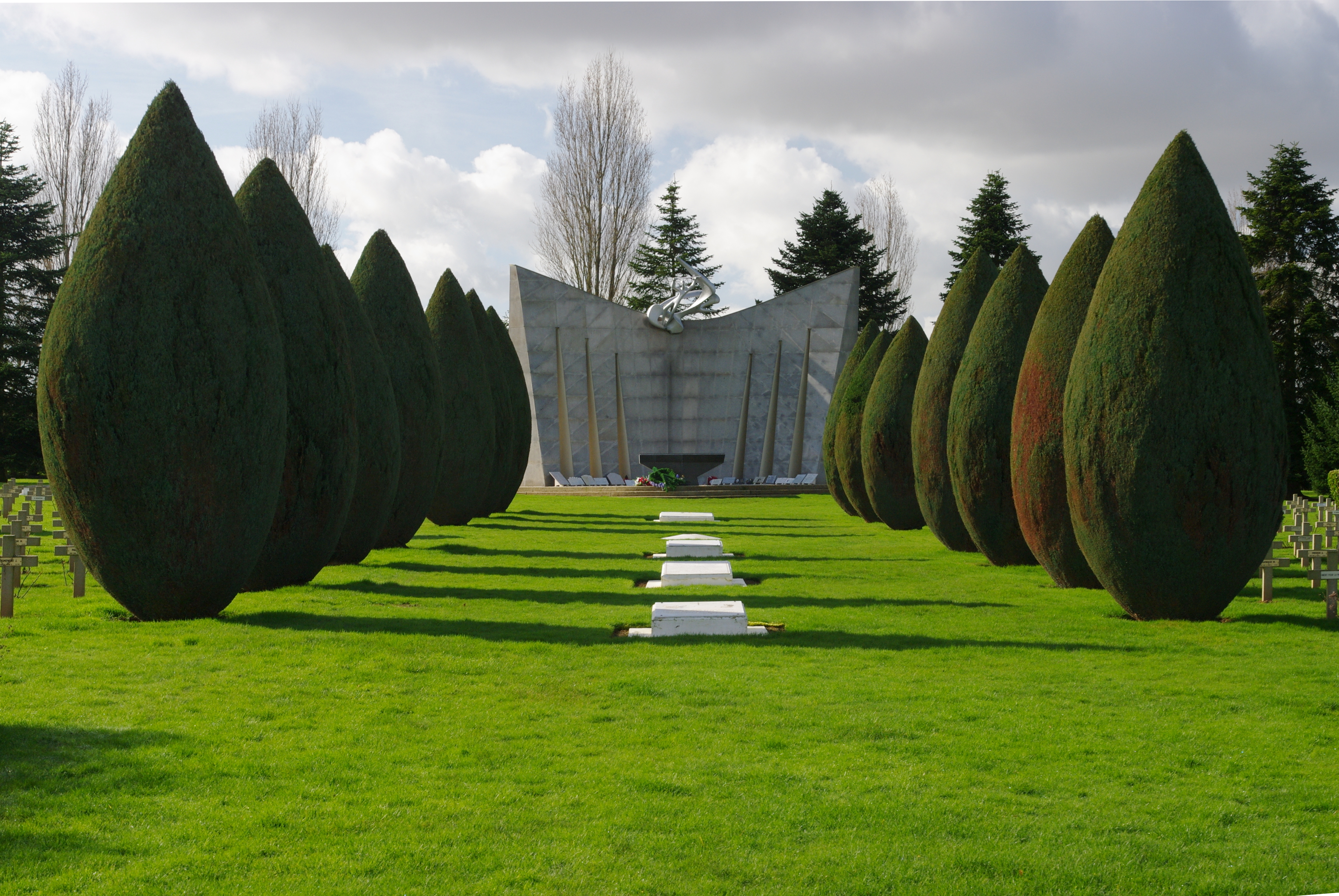
Cimetière Polonais

Cimetière Militaire Polonais de Urville - Polish war cemetery paying tribute to the soldiers killed in the Battle of Hill 262 during World War II.

=== National Heritage sites ===
The Commune has two buildings and areas listed as a Monument historique

- Eglise d'Urville seventeenth century church listed as a monument in 2022.
- Manor House a fourteenth century Manor house listed as a monument in 1929.

== See also ==
- Communes of the Calvados department
