= Marmion =

Marmion may refer to:

== People ==
- Marmion (surname), including a list of people with the name
- Baron Marmion, four different baronies held by the Marmion family
- Edmund Marmion (fl. 1650–1653), English etcher and printmaker
- Manser Marmion (1404–?), English politician

== Places ==
- Marmion, Western Australia, a suburb of Perth
  - Marmion Land District
  - Electoral district of Marmion
- Marmion Abbey, a Benedictine community of the Swiss-American Congregation in Aurora, Illinois, USA
- Marmion Academy, a college-preparatory Catholic high school in Aurora, Illinois, USA
- Marmion Lake, Canada
- Marmion Tower, West Tanfield, North Yorkshire
- Fontenay-le-Marmion, a commune in France

== Other uses ==
- Marmion (poem), an epic poem by Walter Scott about the Battle of Flodden
- Marmion (Comorn, Virginia), U.S., a historic house
- HMS Marmion, two ships of the Royal Navy
