= Marmion (surname) =

Marmion is a surname found in France, Great Britain and Ireland, of Norman-French origin. The origin of the surname itself is disputed.

== Family origin ==
The noble Marmion family in Britain were Normans, who received English land after the Norman Conquest. Their earliest documented ancestor is William Marmion, who exchanged 12 acres of land with Ralf Taisson before Oct 1049 and witnessed a charter of William, Duke of Normandy in 1060. They retained their lands at Fontenay-le-Marmion in Normandy, but William's son Roger (died c. 1075) went to England. Roger was father of Robert Marmion, an ally of Robert Curthose who took part in the First Crusade, and he was apparently succeeded by Roger (died by 1129) and his son Robert Marmion (died 1144).

=== Notable English Marmions ===
- Robert Marmion of Tamworth and Scrivelsby, baron and judge (d. 1218), supporter of King Richard-the-Lionheart and present with other Marmions at the signing of Magna Carta. Father of a Baron Robert-the-Elder and a Baron Robert-the-Younger. Another son, William, was a Baron by summons 1264 and held the Barony of Torrington in Lincolnshire which became extinct at his death. The family also held the Barony of Llanstephan in Wales via conquest of the then Baron Marmion, Roger, in 1114–15, and that title passed via the Marmion Llanstephan female line to the family of DeCamville by the early 13th century. The title of Llanstephan is now extinct
- Sir William Marmion of Scrivelsby, a grandson of the Robert above and son of Robert-the-Younger – called "the Perfect Knight" (d. 1276). His wife was a grandchild of King John of England, and his son Sir John came to possess the Barony of Winteringham in Lincolnshire as a Baron by summons in 1294, continuing in the Marmion family until later merged into the families of Fitzhugh and Parr (last wife of Henry VIII being Catherine Parr) and now represented by the Earls of Pembroke (Herbert family)
- Baron Philip Marmion, died in 1292 a son of Robert-the-Elder He was the oldest grandson of Baron Robert who died 1218 and the last direct Marmion holder of the combined Barony of Tamworth and Scrivelsby. Philip held many important offices under the kings of England. He was also a baron by summons to Parliament in 1261. His titles of Tamworth and Scrivelsby, and the 'championship office', passed to his daughters via fee simple, the barony of Tamworth to one and Scrivelsby to another along with the championship office. That championship office continues to this day in the noble family of Dymoke of Scrivelsby, and is styled 'The Honourable the Champion of England'; and indeed the office was last performed at the Coronation of Queen Elizabeth II in 1952. The baronies of Tamworth and Scrivelsby are not extinct but rather are 'in abeyance' among various descendants of those titles
- Shackerley Marmion, a relatively famous dramatist (1603–1639), with plays performed at the Court of King Charles I and whose works have been republished even into the 20th century.

== Marmion of Ireland ==
The first Marmion in Ireland arrived with the Anglo-Normans in the first invasions of 1169–71. The progenitor was Sir Robert Marmion of 'Fidun' where he built a castle (modern Fathom, County Armagh – a strategic defensive area for the Norman-Irish). He was the younger son of Sir Richard Marmion of Gloucester. He is documented in lists of Strongbow's companions and also in a 'prest' of knights held by King John in Dublin in 1210. Immediate descendants were a Bishop Philip of Ardfert and a Sir Gilbert, also mentioned as of 'Fidun'. The Marmions later gave up living at Fidun due to frontier pressures and removed to close by Carlingford where they were important burgesses and leaders for centuries, until the then Chief-of-Name Marmion forfeited all his lands as an 'Irish Papist' to the Cromwellian invaders, circa 1655.

Historically, the heaviest concentration of the name is indeed found in County Louth, in Carlingford and Dundalk; and then later in Lecale Barony of County Down and County Meath from the 150s, with a smaller branch in County Cork from the 17th century. The Marmions still remain numerous in Louth. There was some emigration of Marmions from Louth to the Mourne area of County Down in the 18th century but there is no further family representation in that area at present.

=== Irish Marmions ===
- Columba Marmion, Irish Benedictine monk (1858–1923) and famous author of numerous works, of the County Meath branch; beatified as 'Blessed Columba Marmion' by the Pope, Rome 2000. Other early Marmions in religion in Ireland were Bishop Philip Marmion of Ardfert in County Kerry, c. 1257–64, Dom Laurence Marmion a Cistercian Monk and lawyer of St. Mary's Abbey Dublin, c. 1340, and William, a brother Knight of the Order of St. John-of-Jerusalem (Knights of Malta) and Deputy Commander of the Prior of Kilmainham, c.1471–72, and Reverend Richard Walton Marmion, 1816–1893, of a Protestant Cork branch of the family who was an important Church of Ireland priest.
- Bishop John Marmion (c.1500–1571), R.Catholic priest then reformed Bishop of Down 1568–71, and Captain Nicholas Marmion, a famous Soldier (c.1540–1598), both of the main branch of the family – Carlingford, County Louth
- General Michael (Miguel) Marmion (1726–1818), a 'Wild Geese' who left Dundalk 1736; graduate of Spanish Military Academy 1758, served 46 years active duty including being Chief Engineer of Venezuela and Governor of Guyana in South America. Was preceded in Spanish service by Captain Dominic Marmion (Regiments of Colonels O Sullivan Mor and Murphy, circa 1650s) and indeed by a Marmion officer in the very first Irish regiment in Spanish service, that of Colonel William Stanley, 1587. An Ensign Joseph Marmion served the Irish cause in the Regiment of Lord Gormanston at the Battle of the Boyne in 1690.
- Anthony Marmion, United Irishman leader of the main Marmion family branch – executed for rebellion 1798; statue of 'Maid of Erin' in Dundalk town square is dedicated to him and a fellow rebel, John Hoey. Anthony's sister Anne was the mother of the P.J. Carroll who started the famous tobacco company of Dundalk in the early 19th century.

== List of people surnamed Marmion ==
- Barrie Marmion (1920–2014), English microbiologist
- Bill Marmion (born 1954), Australian politician
- Celine Marmion, Irish chemist
- Columba Marmion (1858–1923), Irish abbot
- John Marmion (disambiguation), multiple people
- Manser Marmion (1404–c.1457), English MP & Sheriff of Lincolnshire
- Philip Marmion, 5th Baron Marmion of Tamworth (d.1291), Champion of Edward I
- Robert Marmion (disambiguation), multiple people
- Shackerley Marmion (1603–1639), English dramatist
- Simon Marmion (1425–1489), French painter
- William Marmion (disambiguation), multiple people
