= Robert Marmion =

Robert Marmion or Robert Marmyon is the name of:

- Robert Marmion (died 1144)
- Robert Marmion, 2nd Baron Marmion of Tamworth (died before 1181), see Baron Marmion
- Robert Marmion, 3rd Baron Marmion of Tamworth (died 1218), Chief Judiciary of England. Sheriff of Worcestershire.
- Robert Marmion, 4th Baron Marmion of Tamworth (Robert Marmion the Elder, died 1241), son of the 3rd Baron Marmion of Tamworth
- Robert Marmion (died 1242) (Robert Marmion the Younger, died 1242), son of the 3rd Baron Marmion of Tamworth, rebel in the Second Barons' War
- Robert Marmion, 5th Baron Marmion of Winteringham (died 1360), see Baron Marmion

== See also ==
- Marmion (disambiguation)
