= John Marmion =

John Marmion or John Marmyon may refer to:

- John Marmion, 3rd Baron Marmion of Winteringham (d.1322), MP for Lincolnshire
- John Marmion, 4th Baron Marmion of Winteringham (d.1335), MP for Lincolnshire
- John Marmion (d.abt.1580), MP for Cricklade in 1558
