= George Tooke =

English soldier and writer (1595–1675)

George Tooke Esq.
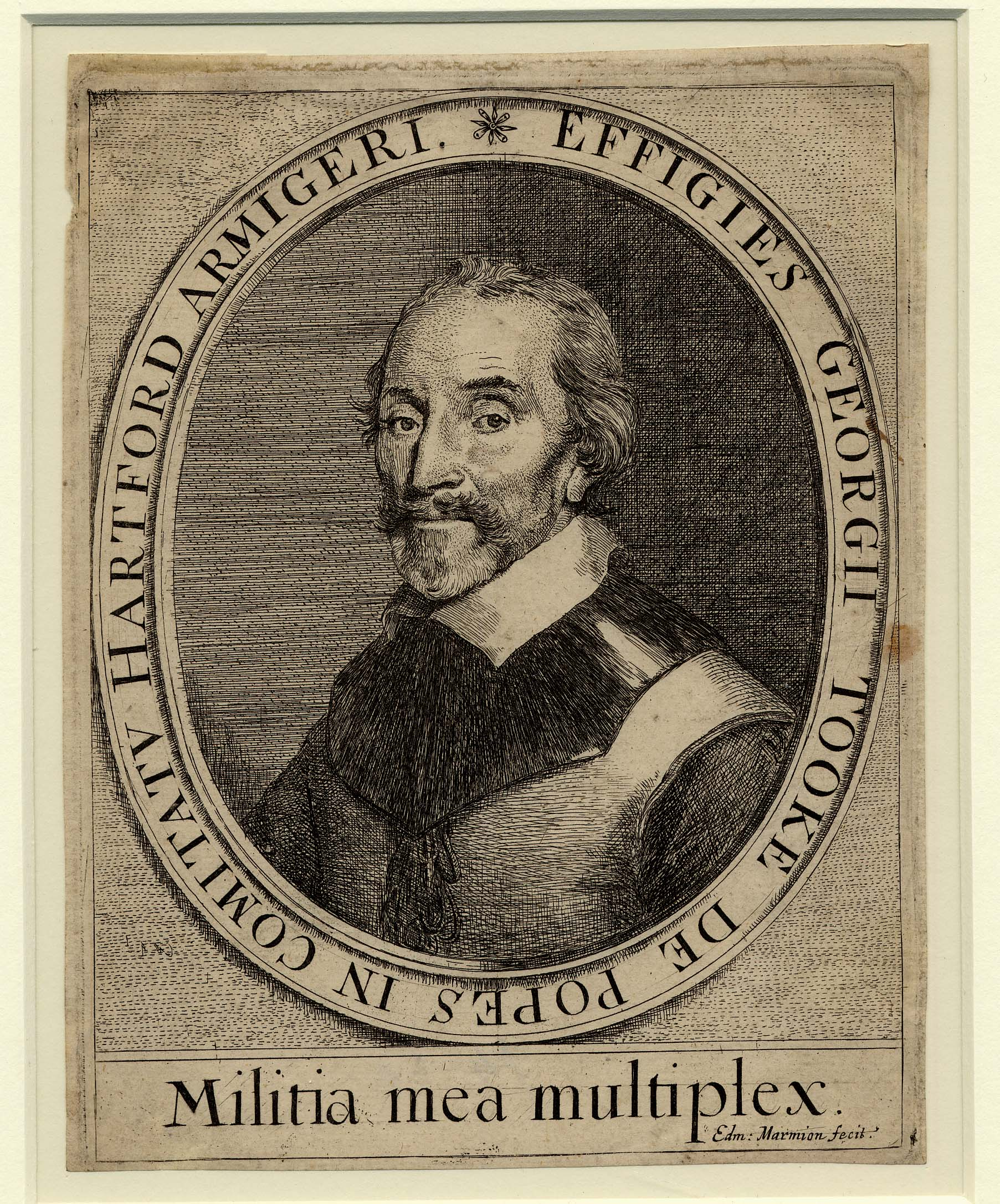
- Portrait etching by Edmund Marmion, c. 1650–53
- Born: 1595; London, England
- Died: 1675 (aged 79–80); Popes, Hertfordshire, England
- Military career
- Allegiance: Kingdom of England
- Conflicts: Anglo-Spanish War; Cádiz expedition

George Tooke (1595–1675) was an English soldier and writer. He took part in the unsuccessful expedition under Sir Edward Cecil against Cadiz in 1628, and wrote an account of the undertaking, The History of Cales Parsion, 1652, in prose and verse. Tooke returned from the expedition in poor health, and was compelled to retire from the military service. He resided on his estate of Popes, in Hertfordshire, and was intimate with Selden and Hales. He was the author also of The Legend of Brita-mart, 1646, and other works.

== Life ==
George Tooke, born in 1595, was the fifth son of Walter Tooke, by his wife Angelet(te) (died 1598), second daughter and coheiress of William Woodcliffe, a citizen and mercer of London. In 1625 George took part in the unsuccessful expedition under Sir Edward Cecil against Cadiz. He commanded a company of volunteers, and afterwards wrote an account of the undertaking, entitled The History of Cales Passion; or as some will by-name it, the Miss-taking of Cales presented in Vindication of the Sufferers, and to forewarne the future. By G. T. Esq., London, 1652, 4to. The work, which is in prose and verse, is dedicated to 'his much honoured cousin Mr John Greaves'. Another edition was published in 1654 with a print by Wenceslaus Hollar; and a third in 1659. After the return of the expedition to Plymouth a severe mortality broke out on board the ships, and Tooke's health was so much impaired that he was eventually compelled to retire from military service. He took up his residence on his paternal estate of Popes, near Hatfield in Hertfordshire, to which he succeeded on the death of his eldest brother Ralph on 22 December 1635. There he enjoyed the intimacy of John Selden the jurist, of the 'ever-memorable' John Hales (1584–1656), and of his cousin, John Greaves, who dedicated to him in 1650 his Description of the Grand Signiors Seraglio. Tooke died at Popes without issue in 1675. He was twice married: first, to Anne, eldest daughter of Thomas Tooke of Bere Court, near Dover. She died on 9 December 1642, and he married, secondly, Margery, daughter of Thomas Coningsbury of North Mimms, Hertfordshire.

== Works ==
Besides the work mentioned, George Tooke was the author of:

1. The Legend of Brita-mart, or a Paraphrase upon our provisionall British Discipline Inditing it of many severall distempers, and prescribing to the Cure, London, 1646, 4to; dedicated to 'William, Earle of Salisbury'. The book consists of what E. I. Carlyle calls "an acute criticism of the constitution of the English infantry" in the form of a dialogue between 'Mickle-Worth the Patriot, Peny-Wise the Worldling, and Mille-Toyle the Souldier'. The copy of this work in the British Library is probably unique.
2. A Chronological Revise of these three successive Princes of Holland, Zeland, and Freisland, Floris the fourth, his Sonne, William, King of the Romans, and Floris the fift, London, 1647, 4to (British Library). This edition, which is without the printer's name, is of extreme rarity. It is divided into three parts: (α) The deplorable Tragedie of Floris the Fift, Earle of Holland, (β) The Chronicle Historie of William, the 28th Earle; (γ) The Chronicle Historie of Floris, the Fourth of that name. It is dedicated to 'My honourable friend Mr. Charles Fairefax'. The third part was separately republished in 1659 (London, 4to); an undated copy also exists in the British Library, with a portrait of Floris.
3. The Belides, London, 1647, 4to, with a frontispiece in compartments, by William Marshall, in two parts: (α) The Belides, or Eulogie and Elegie of that truly Honourable John, Lord Harrington, Baron of Exton, who was elevated hence, the 27th of Febr. 1613; (β) The Belides or Eulogie of that noble Martialist Major William Fairefax, slain at Franenthall in the Palatinate … in the year 1621; (α) was published separately in 1659 (London, 4to), and (β) in 1660 (London, 4to), with a portrait of Fairfax by R. Gaywood.
4. The Eagle Trussers Elegie or briefe presented Eulogie of that Incomparable Generalissimo Gustavus Adolphus, the Great King of Sweden, London, 1647, 4to, with a frontispiece by William Marshall. 'Dedicated to Ferdinando, Lord Fairefax, Baron of Camerone'; another edition was published in 1660, London, 4to.
5. Annæ-dicata, or a Miscelaine of some different cansonets, dedicated to the memory of my deceased very Deere wife, Anna Tooke of Beere, London, 1647, with a frontispiece by William Marshall; another edition was published in 1654 (London, 4to), and the British Library contains an undated copy with manuscript notes, by John Mitford. Copies of the 1647 edition of 3, 4, and 5, bound in one volume, are to be found in the British Library. The volume is probably unique. In his preface to The Eagle Trussers Elegy in 1647 Tooke indicates an earlier edition of some of his works when he says 'the Presse being now to rectifie some peices of mine formerly mis-recorded I have likewise added this old Elegie'.

According to E. I. Carlyle, "Tooke has been unduly disparaged as a writer. Both his prose and his poetry are undoubtedly impaired by a love of far-fetched metaphor and obscured by a painfully involved style. But his writings attest that he possessed ability, and the 'Legend of Brita-mart' shows considerable military knowledge."

== Sources ==
- Carlyle, E. I.; Kelsey, Sean (2007). "Tooke, George (1595–1675), army officer and writer". Oxford Dictionary of National Biography (online ed.). Oxford University Press. doi:10.1093/ref:odnb/27544. (Subscription, Wikipedia Library access or UK public library membership required.)

Attribution:

- This article incorporates text from a publication now in the public domain: Carlyle, Edward Irving (1899). "Tooke, George". In Lee, Sidney (ed.). Dictionary of National Biography. Vol. 57. London: Smith, Elder & Co. pp. 39–40.
