= William Marmion =

William Marmion may refer to:

- William Marmion, Baron Marmion of Torrington (died 1265), English clergyman and member of Simon de Montfort's Parliament
- William Marmion (died 1529) (1461–1529), member of parliament for Gloucester
- William H. Marmion (1907–2002), bishop of the Episcopal Diocese of Southwestern Virginia
- William Marmion (politician) (1845–1906), Australian politician

== See also ==
- Bill Marmion (born 1954), Australian member of the Legislative Assembly of Western Australia
