= Lenton, Lincolnshire =

Village in Lincolnshire, England

Coordinates: 52.859°N 0.479°W

Lenton
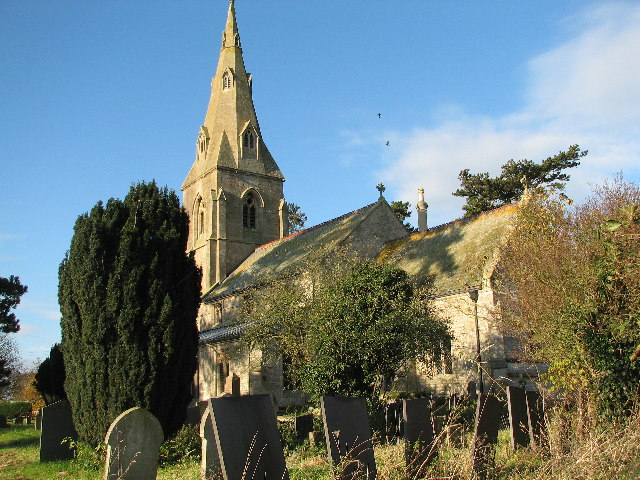
- St Peter's Church, Lenton

- Location within Lincolnshire
- OS grid reference: TF025305
  - London: 95 mi (153 km) S
- Civil parish: Lenton, Keisby and Osgodby
- District: South Kesteven
- Shire county: Lincolnshire
- Region: East Midlands
- Country: England
- Sovereign state: United Kingdom
- Post town: GRANTHAM
- Postcode district: NG33
- Dialling code: 01476
- Police: Lincolnshire
- Fire: Lincolnshire
- Ambulance: East Midlands
- UK Parliament: Grantham and Stamford

Lenton is a village in the civil parish of Lenton, Keisby and Osgodby, in the district of South Kesteven, Lincolnshire, England. It is situated approximately 7 miles (11 km) south-east from Grantham. In 1921 the parish had a population of 117. On 1 April 1931 the parish was abolished to form "Lenton Keisby and Osgodby".

== Village ==
The village is sometimes known as Lavington, and the name may have come from the Old English Lâfa, and the characteristic suffix -ton. The village is listed in the Domesday Book of 1086 as "Lavintone".

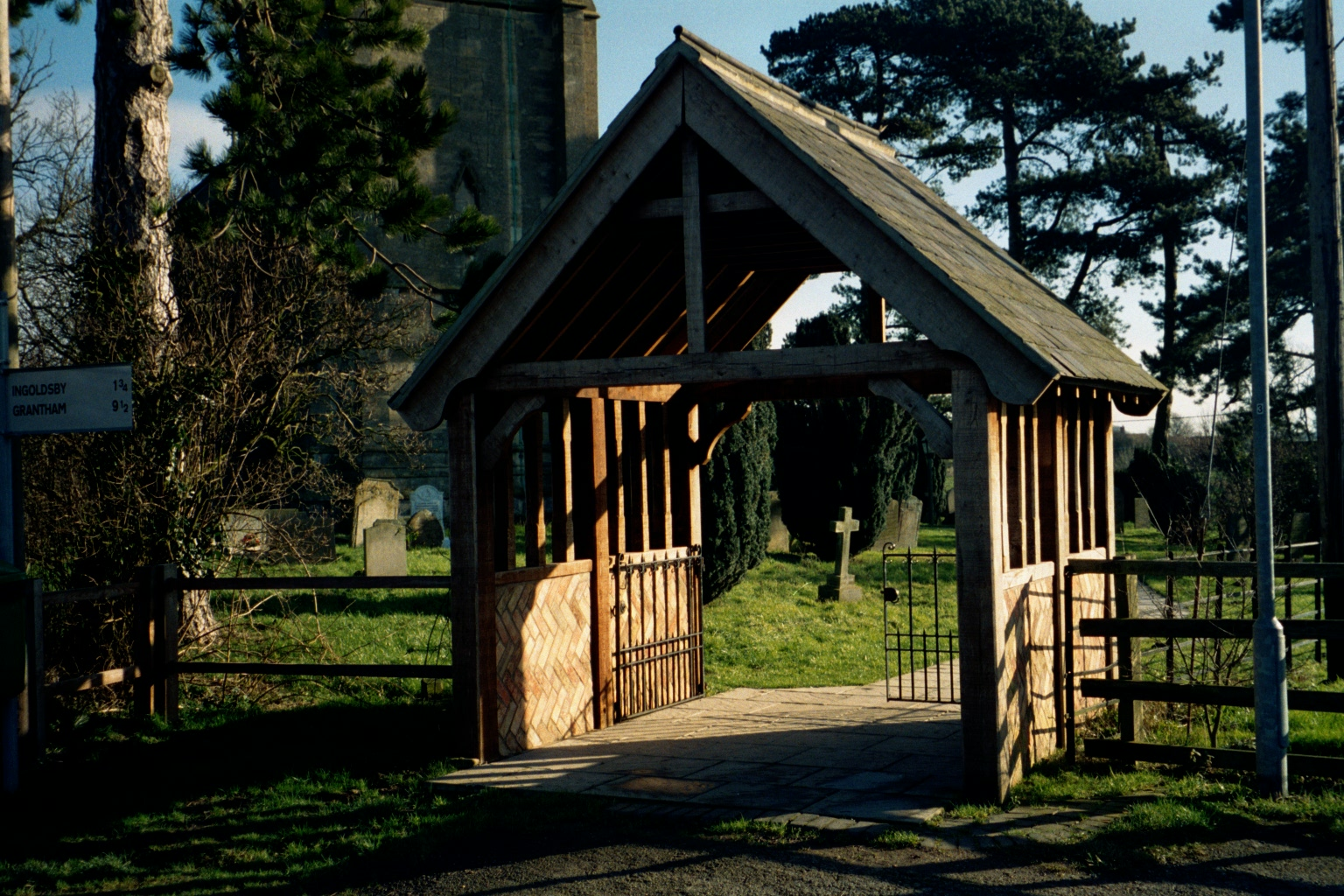
Millennium Lychgate

Lenton parish church is dedicated to St Peter.

The ecclesiastical parish is part of the North Beltisloe Group of parishes in the Deanery of Beltisloe in the Diocese of Lincoln. From 2006 to 2011 the incumbent was The Revd Richard Ireson, who was succeeded by The Revd Mike Doyle in 2012.

The village erected a new Lychgate to mark the Millennium. A previous exhibition to raise funds for the church, The Host of Angels Experience, returned in 2012.

Lavington Lake is a local fishing facility.

Other hamlets in the area are Hanby, Keisby Osgodby and Pickworth. Larger villages close by include Ropsley, Folkingham and Ingoldsby.

== Lost villages ==
The village is associated with the site of the lost medieval settlement of Little Lavington, 0.5 miles (0.8 km) to the north-east.

South of the village is the site of the lost settlement of Osgodby whose name survives in the name of the parish.

== Notable people ==
- Edward Bradley – vicar of Lenton in the 1870s; under the pen name Cuthbert Bede, writer and illustrator of The Adventures of Mr. Verdant Green, the story of an Oxford University undergraduate.
- The village is the burial place of the first and second baronets both called Sir William Armyne. They were both leading puritans in Lincolnshire and supporters of the parliamentary cause in the Civil War.
