= Hanby, Lincolnshire =

Hamlet in the South Kesteven district of Lincolnshire, England

Coordinates: 52.876990°N 0.48171°W

Hanby
- Location within Lincolnshire
- OS grid reference: TF022321
  - London: 95 mi (153 km) SSE
- District: South Kesteven
- Shire county: Lincolnshire
- Region: East Midlands
- Country: England
- Sovereign state: United Kingdom
- Post town: GRANTHAM
- Postcode district: NG33
- Police: Lincolnshire
- Fire: Lincolnshire
- Ambulance: East Midlands
- UK Parliament: Grantham and Stamford

Hanby is a hamlet in the South Kesteven district of Lincolnshire, England. It is situated between Lenton and Ropsley Heath, on the line of the Roman Road King Street. The nearest large town is Grantham 7 miles (11 km) to the north-west. Hanby is part of the civil parish of Lenton, Keisby and Osgodby.

== Lost settlement ==
The hamlet is the location of a lost village of Hanby: English Heritage Archive number TF03SW15; location TF02703159. Past observers have concluded that there were house platforms with building materials, including stone roof tiles, scattered around. Local finds include a flint scraper, Anglo-Saxon pot sherds and medieval sherds. Aerial photographs show no shapes because the area has been ploughed over, but cropmarks show "two conjoined ditched enclosures . . . interpreted as possible crofts, with a small ditched enclosure". There was a ridge and furrow field to the north, but that was ploughed level too; however the farmer found Anglo-Saxon and medieval pottery in these fields. There is another lost settlement called Hanby at Welton le Marsh, or Hanby Hall, in the north of the county.

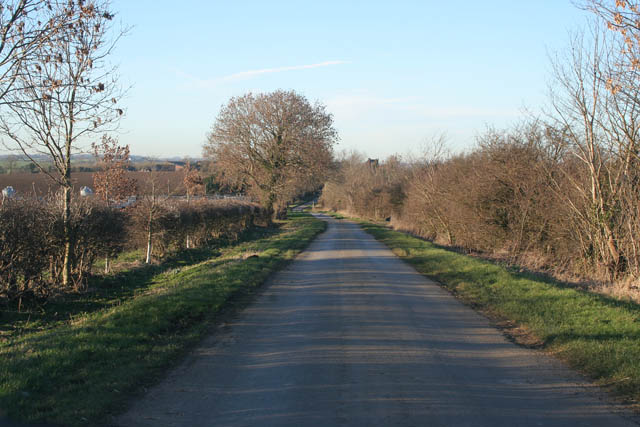
Modern road surface on the line of the Roman Road

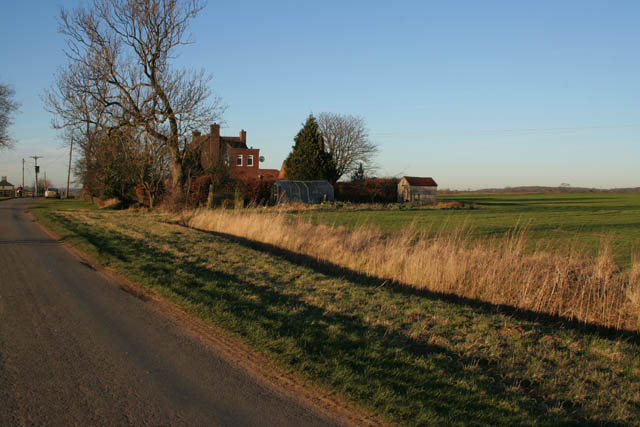
House called Grand View
