= John Marmion, 4th Baron Marmion of Winteringham =

Member of the Parliament of England

Sir John Marmion
- Arms of Marmion of Winteringham: Vair, a fess gules

Member of Parliament

Baron Marmion of Winteringham
- In office 30 May 1324, 7 January 1327 – 9 March 1327
- Monarchs: Edward II & Edward III

Personal details
- Born: 1292
- Died: 1335 (aged 42–43)
- Spouse(s): Elizabeth; Maud Furnival
- Children: Robert Marmion; Joan Marmion; Avice Marmion
- Parent(s): John Marmion & Isabella

Sir John Marmion, Baron Marmion of Winteringham was an Anglo-Norman baron who represented Lincolnshire in Parliament and fought in the Wars of Scottish Independence.

== Ancestry ==
Marmion was the son and heir of John Marmion, Baron Marmion of Winteringham and Isabella and was born around 1292.

== Career and life ==
Marmion was an adherent of the king's cousin and rival Thomas of Lancaster. On 16 October 1313 Marmion was pardoned for his role in the death of Piers Gaveston. In 1314 an arrest warrant was issued for both Marmion and his father who led a group of dozens of men on a raid upon the Abbot of Fountains Abbey's land at Aldeburgh and Baldersby, Yorkshire. Timber, two hundred sheep, fifty oxen and four carts were stolen and the Abbot's servants suffered kidnapping, beatings, cuts and had their beards plucked out. The Abbot and his monks may not have been entirely innocent having themselves been accused of violent assault in 1307 and of stealing deer in 1316.

In May 1314, Marmion was summoned to serve in Henry Tyes' company at the Battle of Bannockburn. Following the defeat, Robert the Bruce and his armies swept south and Marmion was again summoned to defend the north against the Scots at Berwick-upon-Tweed on 30 June 1314.

Marmion joined John de Mowbray's company in Aymer de Valence's attempt to re-capture Berwick in August 1319 which led to the Battle of Myton and a two-year truce.

Marmion's father died at or shortly after the Battle of Boroughbridge in 1322 whereupon Marmion took over his father's lands. This was at a time when the Fens were gradually becoming flooded and at least one of Marmion's meadows at Cherry Willingham sank under water.

Robert Bruce used Boroughbridge as an opportunity to invade eighty miles into the north-west of England, plundering and burning towns as he went. In the last half of 1322, Marmion was summoned to help repel Bruce and drive him back into Scotland, where he operated a scorched earth policy to deprive the English of food. Hunger and dysentery forced King Edward to withdraw his forces back to York. Marmion was stationed there in May 1323 when a thirteen-year truce was agreed between King Edward and Bruce.

Marmion was summoned to a Great Council at Westminster in May 1324 as a Knight of Gloucestershire, Yorkshire, and Lindsey, Lincolnshire.

Marmion accompanied John de Warenne, Earl of Surrey and Queen Isabella in their negotiations with King Charles IV of France in Gascony in March 1325. Rather than returning to England, Isabella stayed in France where she embarked upon an affair with Roger Mortimer and formed a plot to oust her husband, Edward II, from the throne. The plot was successful and Isabella called a Parliament in January 1327, which was attended by Marmion, and which ratified Isabella's eldest son Edward III as the new king.

In April 1327 Marmion was sued by William de Paris for the wardship of William, the underage son and heir of the late Leicestershire knight William Marmion (a leading candidate to be the Knight of Norham Castle fame) and his land at Keisby, Lincs. (Note: It has not been proved exactly how the Marmions of Keisby (who also had land at Galby, Cold Newton, Ringstone, etc) were related to the Marmion Barons of Winteringham but they were their tenants and took over some of their land via the Ridell family who linked the two families)

When the Queen and Roger Mortimer gathered a vast army (Note: including 2500 heavy Flemish cavalry and, for the first time, the cannon) at York in July 1327, Marmion joined them. The campaign saw little fighting and after the Battle of Stanhope Park the English army returned to York and disbanded.

On 25 May 1329, Marmion was granted protection for three years to go on pilgrimage to the Holy Land. Deer were stolen from his park at Tanfield in his absence, and an arrest warrant to catch the thieves was issued on 11 October 1331.

Marmion was appointed to arrest all disturbers of the peace in Sussex on 21 March 1332, shortly before the start of the Second War of Scottish Independence.

Marmion died in 1335, the year of Edward III's 'Great Invasion of Scotland' and the Battle of Boroughmuir.

== Family and descendants ==
Marmion first married Elizabeth before then marrying Maud daughter of Thomas de Furnival and had the following children:

- Robert Marmion, died in 1360 Of infirm condition and never summoned to Parliament.
- Joan Marmion, she died in 1362. She married first to John Bernack, (Note: MP for Lincs in 1346) and second to John Folville,
- Avice Marmion, she was the second wife of John de Gray of Rotherfield.

== Bibliography ==
- Burke, Bernard (1884). Burkes General Armoury. London: Burkes.
- Cokayne, George Edward (1893). Complete Peerage. Vol. I. London: George Bell & Sons.
- Farnham, George F. (1919–20). Leicestershire Manors: The Manors of Allexton, Appleby and Ashby Folville (PDF). Leicester: Leicestershire Archaeological and Historical Society.
- Calendar of Inquisitions Post Mortem. Vol. VI. London: HMSO. 1910.
- Calendar of Inquisitions Post Mortem. Vol. XI. London: HMSO. 1935.
- Nicolas, Nicholas Harris (1857). Historic Peerage of England. London: John Murray.
- Platts, Graham (1985). Land and People in Medieval Lincolnshire. Lincoln: History of Lincolnshire Committee. ISBN 978-0902668034.
- Patent Rolls. Westminster: Parliament of England. 1232–1509.
- Lists and Indexes, No. XXXII. (In Two Parts). Index of Placita De Banco, preserved in the Public Record Office. A.D. 1327-1328. Vol. I. London: Public Record Office. 1909.
- Calendar of Documents Relating to Scotland. Vol. III. Edinburgh: Public Record Office. 1887.
- Parliamentary Writs. London: Public Record Office. 1827.
- Scott, Ronald McNair (1982). Robert the Bruce King of Scots. London: Hutchinson & Co.
- Sympson, Edward Mansel (1911). Memorials of Old Lincolnshire. London: George Allen & Sons Ltd.

Peerage of England
Preceded by John Marmion	Baron Marmion of Winteringham	Succeeded by Robert Marmion
