= Manser Marmion =

English Member of Parliament and Sheriff of Lincolnshire

Sir Manser Marmion

M.P. for Lincolnshire
- In office 30 Jan 1447 – 1448
- Monarch: Henry VI

Sheriff of Lincolnshire
- In office 9 Nov 1448 – 26 Feb 1450
- Monarch: Henry VI

Personal details
- Born: 1404
- Died: 1450-51
- Spouse: Elizabeth Wolfe
- Children: John Marmion
- Parent(s): John Marmion & Margaret

Sir Manser (aka Mauncer) Marmion, of Ringstone in Rippingale and Galby was an English Member of Parliament and Sheriff of Lincolnshire.

== Ancestry ==
His parents were Sir John Marmion (buried in 1415 at Sempringham Priory where his daughter Mabel was a nun) and his wife Margaret. According to Nicholls (1795) and Palmer (1875) the family were descended from Manasser Marmion, 6th son of Robert Marmion the Justiciar and the Counts of Rethel (including Manasses I, Manasses II & Manasses III). But Farnham (1929) mentions that Manasser is recorded as being the son of a Sir William Marmion in evidence submitted by the Marmion family of Galby and Keisby at the National Archives and such is confirmed by various petitions.

== Career and life ==
When Manser reached the age of eighteen, (Note: judging by his stated age in the Parliamentary registers) his mother Margaret gave him the Manor of Keisby, which had been granted to her for life by Geoffrey Luttrel for a yearly rent of 16 marks.

In 1423, Manser made a 100l recognizance to the King to not harm William Gase, Parson of Dunsby church or any other person and in the same year promised to not harm any of the servants of Joan, Countess of Kent, and Humphrey, Earl of Stafford.

In 1434, Manser took the oath not to maintain peace-breakers. In 1435, he attended the Shire Court at Leicester. By 1436, his income was £40 and he held one Knight's fee at Aslackby and Laughton.

He was knighted between 1436 and 1441 and was appointed to Parliament as Knight of the Shire for Lincolnshire on 30 Jan 1447.

He served in France in July 1448 and was Sheriff of Lincolnshire from 9 Nov 1448 to 26 Feb 1450.

During the Lincolnshire feud between the wealthy and violent William Tailboys (later a staunch Lancastrian in the approaching Wars of the Roses) and the ex-Treasurer of England, Ralph de Cromwell, a Writ of Exigend was issued against Tailboys. Tailboy's powerful friend William de la Pole, 1st Duke of Suffolk and Lord High Admiral of England vigorously defended him from prosecution and is supposed to have pressured Sir Manser, then Sheriff, not to arrest Tailboys. Manser was punished for failing to carry out his duty but got off lightly due to Tailboys being pardoned.

Manser's wife Elizabeth died in early 1449, and the income from her Leicestershire estate passed to her son and heir from her first marriage, Robert Walshale, Jnr.

In 1450, Sir Manser went to France in the company of the Treasurer of the Household and newly appointed Lieutenant of Calais, Sir John Stourton.

The cause of Manser's death is not known. He died before 25 Jun 1451 (Note: 1450 was the year that the Lincolnshire gentry violently divided into the two sides of the approaching Wars of the Roses and William De La Pole was murdered), when a writ of Diem Clausit Extremum (literally "he closed his last day" ie died) was issued to enquire upon his estate, whereupon his lands passed to his son and heir John.

== Family ==
Between 1431 and 1435, Manser married Elizabeth, daughter and heir of John Wolfe (aka le Lupus), Esq. of Frolesworth (descendant and heir of the d'Amory, d'Anvers and Sackevill families who held the manor before him) and widow of Robert Walshale (d.1431). Manser and Elizabeth had the following issue:-

- John Marmion (d.1465), fathered Mauncer (who married Edith daughter of Sir Thomas Berkeley of Wymondham). John and Mauncer Jnr both subsequently served as High Sheriff of Lincolnshire, in 1460 and 1497, respectively.

Manser's family "daughtered out" in the 1500s with his great-great-granddaughter Katherine Marmion. She married John Haselwood, Master of the Fleet Prison and had eleven children before remarrying to Thomas Claughton, Esq.
