= Institute of Chemistry of Ireland =

Society representing chemists in Ireland

- Abbreviation: ICI
- Predecessor: The Chemical Association of Ireland, Irish Chemical Association
- Established: 18 January 1950; 76 years ago
- Purpose: Science, academics
- Location: Ireland
- Fields: Chemistry
- Leader: Celine Marmion
- Website: Official website

The Institute of Chemistry of Ireland (ICI) is a society representing chemists in Ireland. It is led by Celine Marmion, a Professor of Chemistry at the Royal College of Surgeons in Ireland.

== History ==
The first meeting was held on 15 May 1922. This meeting led to the formation of The Chemical Association of Ireland on 15 June 1923 which remained active until 1930. After several years of inactivity, the Irish Chemical Association was formed on 14 March 1936. At the end of the 1940s, it became clear that the association needed to evolve to achieve greater government recognition. A series of meetings led to the formation of the present Institute of Chemistry of Ireland on 18 January 1950.

== Membership ==
Members of the ICI are chemists who satisfy certain qualification criteria. There are several membership categories.

== Journals ==
=== Irish Chemical News ===
The official journal of the ICI is Irish Chemical News. Two issues are published each year and are available through the institute website.

=== Physical Chemistry Chemical Physics ===
The journal Physical Chemistry Chemical Physics (PCCP) published by the Royal Society of Chemistry is co-owned by the ICI along with 17 other national chemical societies. The journal publishes a broad range of research articles in physical chemistry, chemical physics and biophysics.
