= John Marmion, 3rd Baron Marmion of Winteringham =

13th and 14th-century English landowner and member of Parliament

John Marmion
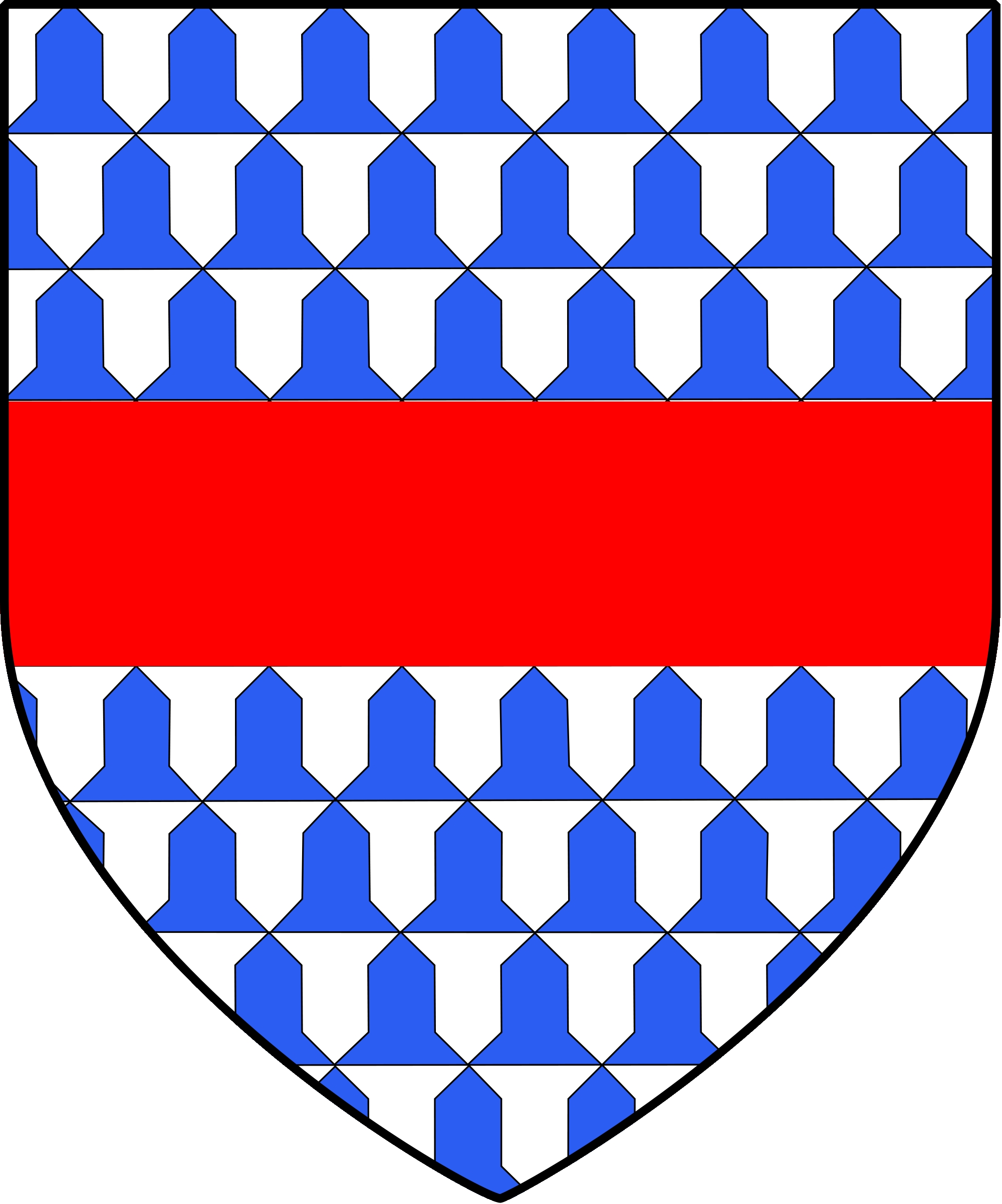
- Arms of Marmion of Winteringham: Vair, a fess gules

M.P. for Lincolnshire

Baron Marmion of Winteringham
- In office 8 June 1294, 26 January 1297, 25 May 1298, 26 July 1313 – 14 March 1322
- Monarch: Edward II

Personal details
- Died: before 7 May 1322
- Spouse: Isabella (perhaps Peck?)
- Children: John Marmion
- Parent(s): William Marmion & Lorette, daughter of Richard FitzRoy

John Marmion, Baron Marmion of Winteringham was an Anglo-Norman baron who represented Lincolnshire in Parliament and fought in the Wars of Scottish Independence.

== Ancestry ==
Marmion was the son of William Marmion, 2nd Baron Marmion of Winteringham and his wife Lorette, daughter of Richard FitzRoy and granddaughter of King John.

== Career and life ==
In 1276 Marmion paid homage to the Abbot of Peterborough who granted him his father's lands. He was distrained for knighthood in 1278.

Marmion served repeatedly in the Scottish War from 1291 to 1322.

Marmion was summoned to the king's councils on 8 June 1294, 26 January 1297 and from 26 July 1313 to 14 March 1322 and as a Knight of the Shire for Lincolnshire to York on 25 May 1298.

During the turbulence of 1314 that saw growing friction between Edward II, Piers Gaveston and Thomas, 2nd Earl of Lancaster and his large private army, Marmion became involved in trouble for reasons not immediately obvious. An arrest warrant was issued for both John and his son John Marmion who led a group of dozens of men on a raid upon Fountains Abbey's land at Aldeburgh and Balderby, Yorkshire. Timber, two hundred sheep, fifty oxen and four carts were stolen and the abbot's servants suffered kidnapping, beatings, cuts and had their beards plucked out. The abbot and his monks may not have been entirely innocent having themselves been accused of violent assault in 1307 and of stealing deer in 1316.

The dispute seems to have been overtaken by events and after the disastrous Battle of Bannockburn Marmion was summoned to defend the north against the rampant Scots. Forgiveness was forthcoming and on 24 September 1314 he was granted licence to crenellate his mansion "the Hermitage" in his wood at Tanfield.

The king ordered Marmion to not go to the Earl of Lancaster's meeting of good peers on 29 November 1321. He was then ordered to bring his forces to Coventry on 28 February 1322 to march against the Earl's adherents. This culminated in the Battle of Boroughbridge on 16 March 1322.

Marmion likely died at the battle, or shortly after, as on 7 May 1322 (Note: This is the death date usually quoted by historians but none have explained why an Inquisition Post-Mortem was held for a John Marmion of Winteringham in 1295. It is possible that John was held hostage in Scotland or became lost and an Inquisition was made prematurely. On the other hand it is feasible that instead of there being two generations of Winteringham Marmions called John there were actually three who died in 1295, 1322 and 1335.) an inquisition post-mortem was held to assess his estates in Yorkshire which established that he owned West Tanfield, Wath, Langeton and Wirton manors, and one knight's fee in Exelby. A second inquisition found he owned Quinton, Gloucestershire, Berwick and Wingeton in Sussex, Luddington and Castre in Northamptonshire and Willingham and Winteringham in Lincolnshire.

In addition to his manors, Marmion also held four knight's fees at Wintringham and Wolingham, one at Keisby and a 1/4 at Trickingham and Stowe.

== Family and descendants ==
Marmion married Isabella (perhaps Peck?) and had a son John Marmion, who died in 1335. Another son may have been Richard Marmion who was accused of cutting William Gentyl's right hand off at Gunthorpe, Lincolnshire in 1317.

== Sources ==
- Banks, Thomas Christopher (1844). Baronies in Fee. London: W. M. Harrison.
- Burke, Bernard (1884). Burkes General Armoury. London: Burkes.
- Curia Regis Rolls. London: HMSO. 1189–1250.
- Caley, John (1806). Calendarium Inquisitionum post mortem sive Escaetarum. Vol. 1. London: Record Commission.
- Cokayne, George Edward (1893). Complete Peerage. Vol. I. London: George Bell & Sons.
- Harleian (1929). The Knights of Edward I. Vol. I. London: Harleian Society.
- Nicolas, Nicholas Harris; Courthope, William (1857). Historic Peerage of England. London: John Murray.
- Palmer, Charles Ferrers R. (1875). History of the Baronial Family of Marmion, Lords of the Castle of Tamworth, etc. Tamworth: J. Thompson.
- Close Rolls. Westminster: Parliament of England. 1224–1468.
- Patent Rolls. Westminster: Parliament of England. 1232–1509.
- Parliamentary Writs. London: Public Record Office. 1827. p. 417.
- Stapleton, Thomas (1844). Magni Rotuli Scaccarii Normannias. London: Society of Antiquaries.

Peerage of England
Preceded by William Marmion	Baron Marmion of Winteringham	Succeeded by John Marmion
