= Baron Marmion =

English Barons

Arms of Philip Marmion: Vair, a fess gules paillée or

Arms of Marmion of Tamworth, Winteringham and Torrington: Vair, a fess gules

Arms of Philip Marmion, 5th feudal baron of Tamworth: Vair, a fess gules fretty or

There have been four different baronies held by the Marmion family, two feudal baronies, one purported barony created by Simon de Montfort and one barony by writ.

== Feudal barony of Tamworth ==
The first feudal barony was obtained by Roger Marmion or Robert de Marmion (died c. 1129), who held lands in Lindsay in 1115–18, lord of the manor of Fontenay and castellan of Falaise Castle, Normandy, when between 1110 and 1114 he was granted the feudal barony of Tamworth, the caput of which was Tamworth Castle, after the exile of Roger d'Abetot, nephew and heir of the King's steward, Robert Despenser. The eldest son of the 3rd Marmion feudal baron of Tamworth acquired the manor of Winteringham in North Lincolnshire.

== Welsh feudal barony of Llanstephan ==
A second barony was obtained by Roger Marmion, lord of the manor of Fontenay-le-Marmion during the Norman invasion of Wales when he was rewarded with the Barony of Llanstephan, whose caput at Llansteffan Castle played a central role in the Welsh wars.

== Barony of Torrington, purported barony by writ (1264) ==
The third barony was a barony by writ of summons for William Marmion (as "Baron of Torrington") to Simon de Montfort's Parliament in 1264, but the summons was not continued after the rebels' defeat at the Battle of Evesham in 1265. Under modern law, this summons did not create a peerage.

== Barony of Winteringham, barony by writ ==
Created for John Marmion (d.1322).

== Ancestry ==
According to Cokayne "the earliest known occurrence of the Marmion name seems to be that of a William Marmion who exchanged 12 acres of land with Ralf Taisson, son of Ralf the Angevin, which were granted by the latter to the abbey of Fontenay before Oct 1049 and who acted as a witness to a confirmation charter by William Duke of Normandy in 1060. Due to similarities between the coats of arms of the Taisson and Marmion families there is some speculation that they were related.

== King's Champion ==
Legend has it that the Marmions were Champions of Normandy before moving to England during the Anarchy. Robert Marmion's defence of King Stephen's castle at Falaise (birthplace of William the Conqueror and former seat of the Dukes of Normandy) in 1140 against Geoffrey of Anjou, is possibly an indication that the title originally had more than symbolic meaning. In addition, as Normandy was still the homeland of the Kings of England at this time, it makes sense that, if one existed, the King's Champion would be known as "Champion of Normandy and England".

Philip Marmion (d.1291) used the "3 Swords" badge, later used by the Dymokes to denote being hereditary Champions of England, as a seal as early as 1265, and in 1328 Tamworth Castle was held by the service of "appearing armed in the Royal Arms and mounted on the King's best charger to make proof for the king against any who opposed his coronation".

The duty passed to the Dymokes through Philip's granddaughter Margaret Ludlow, due to his having no legitimate male heirs.

== Baron Marmion of Tamworth (c.1110-14) ==
By Tenure (feudal barony)

- Robert Marmion (died 1144)
- Robert Marmion, 2nd Baron Marmion of Tamworth (d.bef Oct 1181), son and heir. Lord of Fontenay. Married Elizabeth(?) (de Rethel?)
- Robert Marmion, 3rd Baron Marmion of Tamworth (d.bef 15 May 1218), son and heir. Chief Judiciary of England. Sheriff of Worcestershire. Rebel in the First Barons' War.
- Robert Marmion, 4th Baron Marmion of Tamworth (aka Robert Marmion the Elder) (d.1248), son and heir of Robert Marmion, 3rd Baron Marmion of Tamworth and his 1st wife. Rebel in the First Barons' War. Married Juliana daughter of Philip de Vassy, Baron of Vassy, Lord Forest Auvray
- Philip Marmion, 5th Baron Marmion of Tamworth (d.1291), son and heir. Sheriff of Warwickshire & Leicestershire. Royalist in the Second Barons' War. Died without legitimate male heirs so his office of Kings Champion of England and Manor of Scrivelsby passed to Dymoke descendants of his daughter Margery.

== Baron Marmion of Llanstephan (c.1114) ==
By tenure (feudal barony)

- Roger Marmion, Lord of Fontenay (d.abt.1129). Awarded Llanstephan c.1114.
- Robert Marmion, 1st Baron Marmion of Tamworth (d. 1143), eldest son of Roger Marmion, Lord of Fontenay.
- Robert Marmion, 2nd Baron Marmion of Tamworth (d. 1185)
- Geoffrey Marmion, youngest son of Roger Marmion, Lord of Fontenay. Granted Llanstephan by his nephew, Robert Marmion, 2nd Baron Marmion of Tamworth, in 1166. Benefactor of the Knights Templar.
- Albreda, sole daughter and heir of Geoffrey Marmion, married William, son of the crusader Richard de Camville, and so the barony passed into the de Camville family.

== Baron Marmion of Winteringham ==
By tenure

- Robert Marmion, 1st Baron Marmion of Winteringham (d.1241 Barons' Crusade) (aka Robert Marmion the Younger), son of Robert Marmion, 3rd Baron Marmion of Tamworth and his 2nd wife. Rebel in the First Barons' War. Married Avice (Inq PM 1282) daughter of Jernegan Fitz-Hugh of Tanfield.
- William Marmion, 2nd Baron Marmion of Winteringham (d.27 Jul 1274), son and heir. Rebel in the Second Barons' War. Married firstly Lorette, daughter of Richard FitzRoy (illegitimate son of King John of England and Adela de Warenne) and secondly to Sibilla relict of Robert de Mar(e)s of Mears Ashby.

By writ

- John Marmion, 3rd Baron Marmion of Winteringham (d.1322 Battle of Boroughbridge?), son and heir. Married Isabel.
- John Marmion, 4th Baron Marmion of Winteringham (d.1335), son and heir. Married Maud, daughter of Thomas, 1st Lord Furnival
- Robert Marmion, 5th Baron Marmion of Winteringham (d.abt.1360), son and heir, died without issue whereupon the Barony fell into abeyance between his sisters, Joan, Lady Bernack and Avice, Lady Grey. Avice's moiety, or half share, of the Barony passed to her Fitz-Hugh descendants.

== Baron Marmion of Torrington (1264) ==
Purported barony by writ

- William Marmion. Son of Robert Marmion, 3rd Baron Marmion of Tamworth. Priest (and Dean of Tamworth?). Summoned to Parliament as a Baron after the Battle of Lewes but after the rebels' defeat at Evesham was never recalled.
