= Baron Ridel of Wittering =

Arms of Baron Ridel of Wittering:- Or, 3 piles in point gules, surmounted by a bend azure.

The Ridel family originally came from Normandy and settled in England after the Conquest. Geoffery Ridel became Justiciar of England and was rewarded with much land including Wittering.

- Geoffrey Ridell, Justiciar of England. Died 25 November 1120 in the wreck of the White Ship with William Adelin. Married Geva, the daughter of Hugh Lupus, Earl of Chester. Geva founded Canwell Monastery. Daughter and heir Maud married Richard Basset later Justice of England and was succeeded by
- Geoffrey Basset assumed the surname of Ridell. Baron of Blaye in France and held 15 knights fees in England. Died immensely wealthy, but intestate, so estate seised by the king. He had two sons by 1st wife, Geoffrey and Richard. By his 2nd wife Sibilla, sister of William Mauduit, Lord of Hanslope, he had 2 more sons Hugh (who succeeded him) and William, who was High Chancellor of Scotland under William the Lion William was the Lord of Farringdon, Northants and was succeeded by his son Ralph Ridel of Strixton, Northants and Keisby, Lincolnshire, who died in 1214)
- Hugh Ridell who married Margaret daughter and heir of Peter de Sancto Medardo from whom he obtained the lordships of Wittering and others in England, Scotland and France. He was a hostage after the Battle of Alnwick. Hugh had three sons Geoffrey, Hugh, and Richard.

== Sources ==
- Betham, William (1804). The Baronetage of England. London: Warde & Betham.
- Hutchinson, William (1823). The history and antiquities of the county palatine of Durham. Vol. I. Durham: G.Walker.
- Nicolas, Nicholas (1857). Historic Peerage of England. London: John Murray.
