= Celine Marmion =

Chemistry researcher

Celine J. Marmion
- Education: University of Surrey (PhD); Kingston University (PGCE)
- Scientific career
- Workplaces: St Mary's University, Twickenham; Royal College of Surgeons in Ireland

Celine J. Marmion is a professor of chemistry at the Royal College of Surgeons in Ireland and President of the Institute of Chemistry of Ireland. She is a Fellow of the Royal Society of Chemistry and the Institute of Chemistry of Ireland. Marmion is involved with the design of new chemotherapeutic drugs.

== Early life and education ==
Marmion earned her doctoral degree at the University of Surrey in 1994. Her PhD research involved investigations into vanadium complexes and nitrogen fixation. In 1994 Marmion was appointed as a lecturer at St Mary's University, Twickenham, where she worked until 1995. She returned to study in 1995, and earned a Postgraduate Certificate in Education (PGCE) at Kingston University.

== Research and career ==
In 1997 Marmion joined Royal College of Surgeons in Ireland as a lecturer in the Department of Chemistry. She was promoted to associate professor in 2013 and Professor in 2018. Her research considers the design of metal-based chemotherapeutic drugs. In particular, this has included the design of targeted Pt^{IV} prodrugs. Immunodeficient cancer patients are at risk of developing infections, which occasionally require antimicrobial prophylaxis. To better serve these patients Marmion developed a family of metallo-antibiotics, based on a Cu-N,N-framework, which can bind to DNA, has DNA oxidant properties and has antiproliferative and antimicrobial properties. Her research has been supported by the Science Foundation Ireland (SFI) to create a prodrug strategy for multi-modal chemotherapeutics.

=== Awards and honours ===
Her awards and honours include:

- 2009 Royal College of Surgeons in Ireland President's Teaching Award 'for excellence in teaching'
- 2010 Vice-Dean of the Royal College of Surgeons in Ireland Faculty of Medicine & Health Sciences
- 2013 President of the Irish Biological Inorganic Chemistry Society
- 2013 Elected Fellow of the Royal Society of Chemistry
- 2015 Elected Fellow of the Institute of Chemistry of Ireland
- 2015 Royal College of Surgeons in Ireland President's Teaching Award 'for excellence in teaching'
- 2016 Royal College of Surgeons in Ireland Dean's Academic Award for 'Endeavour, Innovation, Collaboration and Service'
- 2017 Irish Network of Healthcare Educators Education Research Grant
- 2017 Vice President of the Institute of Chemistry of Ireland
- 2019 President of the Institute of Chemistry of Ireland

=== Selected publications ===
Her publications include:

- Marmion, Celine (2019). Metal-based Anticancer Agents. Royal Society of Chemistry. ISBN 9781788014069.
- Marmion, Celine J. (2004). "Hydroxamic Acids− An Intriguing Family of Enzyme Inhibitors and Biomedical Ligands". European Journal of Inorganic Chemistry. 2004 (15): 3003–3016. doi:10.1002/ejic.200400221.
- Marmion, Celine J. (2000). "Hydroxamic acids are nitric oxide donors. Facile formation of ruthenium(II)-nitrosyls and NO-mediated activation of guanylate cyclase by hydroxamic acids". Chemical Communications (13): 1153–1154. doi:10.1039/B001631O.
