= William Marmion, Baron Marmion of Torrington =

Member of the Parliament of England

William Marmion
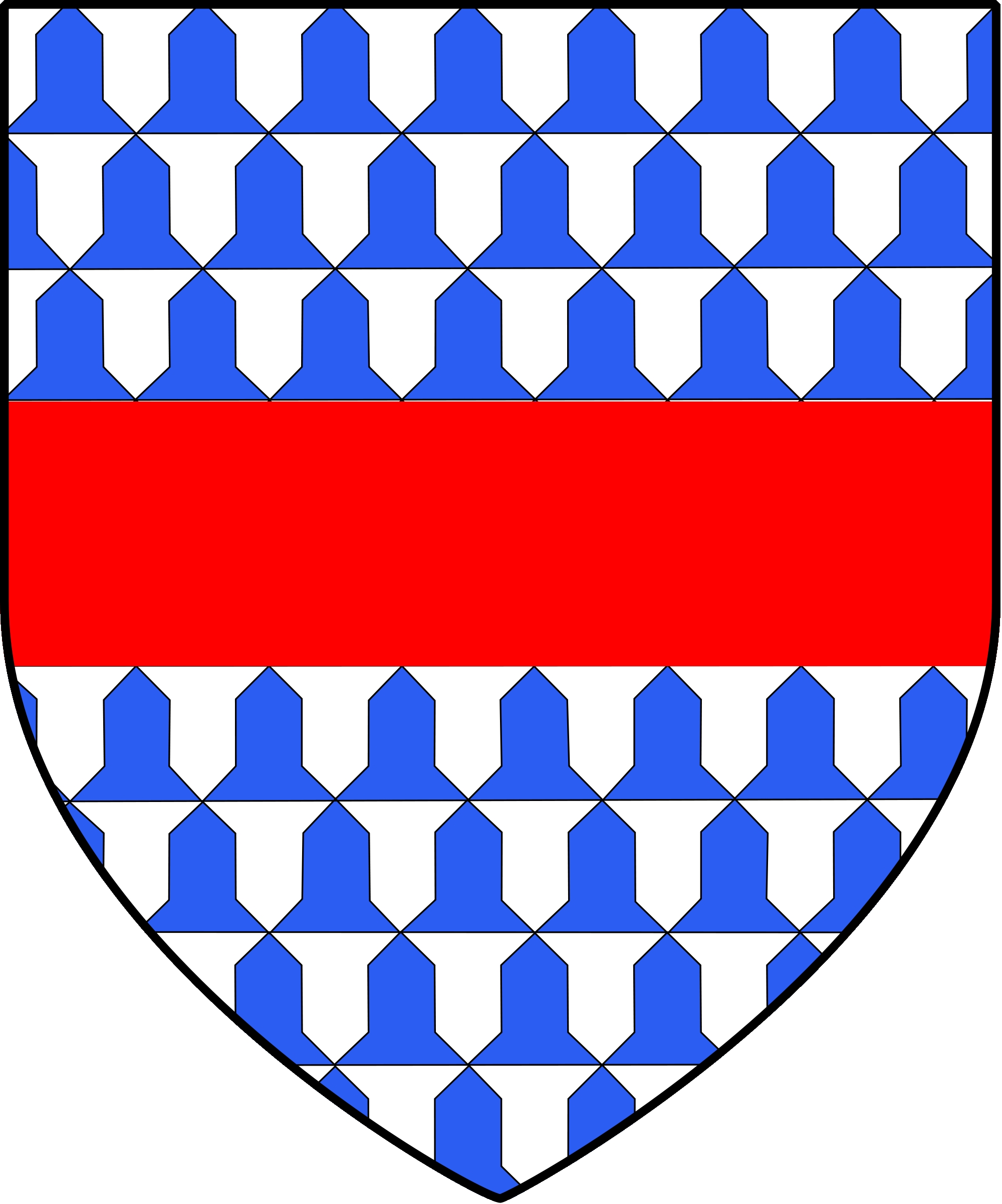
- Marmion of Torrington:- vair, a fess gules

Member of parliament

Baron Marmion of Torrington
- In office 20 January 1265 – 15 February 1265
- Monarch: Simon de Montfort

Personal details
- Born: bef. 1200
- Died: aft. 1265
- Parent(s): Robert Marmion, 3rd Baron Marmion of Tamworth & Phillipa

William Marmion, Baron Marmion of Torrington, was an English clergyman and member of Simon de Montfort's Parliament.

== Ancestry ==
He was the son of Robert Marmion, 3rd Baron Marmion of Tamworth, and his second wife Philippa.

== Career and life ==
During the First Barons' War a group of rebellious barons, supported by Prince Louis of France, made war on King John of England due to his cruel and inept leadership. Although John signed Magna Carta on 15 June 1215, war broke out in England. William Marmion's elder brother, Robert Marmion the elder, was one of the rebel barons (as was their father) and on 25 February 1216 the King sent William to see if he could persuade him to make peace with the King again. John died on 18 October 1216 and was succeeded by his nine-year-old son Henry who, not being despised by the barons, attempted to calm things down.

On 15 May 1218 Henry confirmed William's lordship of the manor of Torrington, Lincolnshire, and 10 librates (£10 worth of land) in Berwick, Sussex, which his father had previously given him by charter.

Distrust between the barons and Henry remained though and in 1222 the king ordered the Sheriff of Lincolnshire to seize the lands of William Marmion, Cleric, at Torrington and to value them, as Henry had been informed that William had left England without licence to join his rival King Louis. It was not until December 1235 that William reappeared and petitioned the king to give him back his lands, claiming that he not been in France at all. William was forgiven and reunited with Torrington after making a payment of £20.

William was presented to the church of Coningsby c. 1236 and acted as guardian to his nephew Philip Marmion, 5th Baron Marmion of Tamworth, during his minority. According to Palmer, William later became Dean of the collegiate church of Tamworth. (Note: no reference was specified by Palmer and it is possible that the Dean was another William Marmion as there were several different ones in the 13th century)

William's father had founded the Abbey of Barbery and in 1238 William gave it land for the "souls of his mother and father and his brother Robert junior". His seal attached to the deed consists of an angel, erect and holding a censer, with the words "William Marmion, cleric" written underneath.

As the long reign of King Henry III progressed he increased taxation and, when combined with the famine of the time, caused the barons to rise up in arms again in the Second Barons' War. The barons were led by Simon de Montfort and after he had defeated Henry III at the Battle of Lewes on 14 May 1264, he held a Parliament at Westminster Palace. Large numbers of clergy and burgesses were invited to attend for the first time in the hope that de Montford would recruit more support for his rebellion, as most of the barons had already chosen sides or been killed in the war. The aged William Marmion was one of the clergy chosen and was summoned by writ on 24 December 1264.

== Family and descendants ==
Marmion is not known to have married or had issue, nor is it likely as he would have taken a vow of celibacy when he took holy orders.

During the mid-13th century there are records of a "William son of William Marmion" in Lincolnshire but he is perhaps more likely to have been a junior son of William Marmion or a more distantly related junior Marmion line.

== Bibliography ==
- Banks, Thomas Christopher (1844). Baronies in Fee. London: W. M. Harrison.
- Burke, Bernard (1884). Burkes General Armoury. London: Burkes.
- Curia Regis Rolls. London: HMSO. 1189–1250.
- Nicolas, Nicholas Harris; Courthope, William (1857). Historic Peerage of England. London: John Murray.
- Palmer, Charles Ferrers R. (1875). History of the Baronial Family of Marmion, Lords of the Castle of Tamworth, etc. Tamworth: J. Thompson.
- Close Rolls. Westminster: Parliament of England. 1224–1468.
- Fine Rolls. Westminster: Parliament of England. 1199–1461.
- Stapleton, Thomas (1844). Magni Rotuli Scaccarii Normannias. London: Society of Antiquaries.
