= Robert Marmion (died 1144) =

Anglo-Norman baron and soldier

Robert Marmion (died 1144) was an Anglo-Norman baron and soldier who rose to prominence during the wars between King Stephen and the Empress Matilda.

== Origins ==
From a Norman family originating at Fontenay-le-Marmion and born before 1108, he was the son and heir of Roger Marmion or Robert de Marmion, who held lands in Lincolnshire.

== Career ==
After the death of his father shortly before November 1129, he gave away some of his inherited estates to the nuns of Polesworth Abbey and the monks of Bardney Abbey. He also entered into contention with William Beauchamp over tenure of Tamworth Castle, where before 1135 he received a grant of free warren from King Henry I of England. Sources that call him 1st Baron of Tamworth are misleading, as no such claim is recognised by modern authorities.

When civil war broke out in 1139, he rallied to the side of King Stephen and was sent to hold Falaise Castle in Normandy against attack from Matilda's husband, Geoffrey of Anjou. He proved to be "a warlike man with no match for boldness, fierceness or cunning" and his successful defence led Geoffrey to destroy his ancestral castle of Fontenay in reprisal.

Recalled to England, he was engaged in the assault on Coventry Castle, held by the formidable Ranulf II, Earl of Chester. He expelled the monks from the nearby St Mary's Priory and made its stone buildings into a fortified base for launching attacks on the castle. He also had ditches dug in front of the priory to impede his opponents. When the earl arrived with a relieving force, on about 16 September 1144 Marmion went out with his men to confront them but was thrown from his horse. Upon landing in one of his ditches, he was immobilized by a broken thigh and beheaded by a common soldier.

He was buried at Polesworth, in unconsecrated ground as he had been excommunicated for his desecration of St Mary's Priory.

== Family ==
His wife was named Millicent, a relation of King Henry I's second wife Adeliza of Louvain. Some sources say she was the daughter of Gervais, Count of Rethel, elder brother of King Baldwin II of Jerusalem. After Robert's death, she married Richard Camville.

Their son is given in some sources as Robert, who died before October 1181 and is supposed to be the father of a third Robert, dead in 1218.
