= E. I. Carlyle =

British author and historian

Edward Irving Carlyle (15 September 1871 – 9 February 1952) was a British author and historian.

He was educated at St John's College, Oxford, where he was a Casberd scholar. He graduated in 1894 and was appointed assistant editor of the Dictionary of National Biography. He relinquished this role after being elected a Fellow of Merton College, Oxford, in 1901. He then served at Lincoln College, Oxford, from 1907 until he retired in 1944.

In 1904 he published a sympathetic biography of William Cobbett and he also contributed histories of British South Africa, East Africa and West Africa to Albert Pollard's 1909 work The British Empire.

He married Susan Mary Catherine née Hockin in 1913, with who he had a son and two daughters.

== Works ==
- William Cobbett: A Study of His Life as Shown in His Writings (1904).
- Gertrude by Hermann Hesse (1923, as translator).
- Rosshalde by Hermann Hesse (1925, as translator).
- Peter Camenzind by Hermann Hesse (1929, as translator).
