= William Marmion (died 1529) =

Member of the Parliament of England

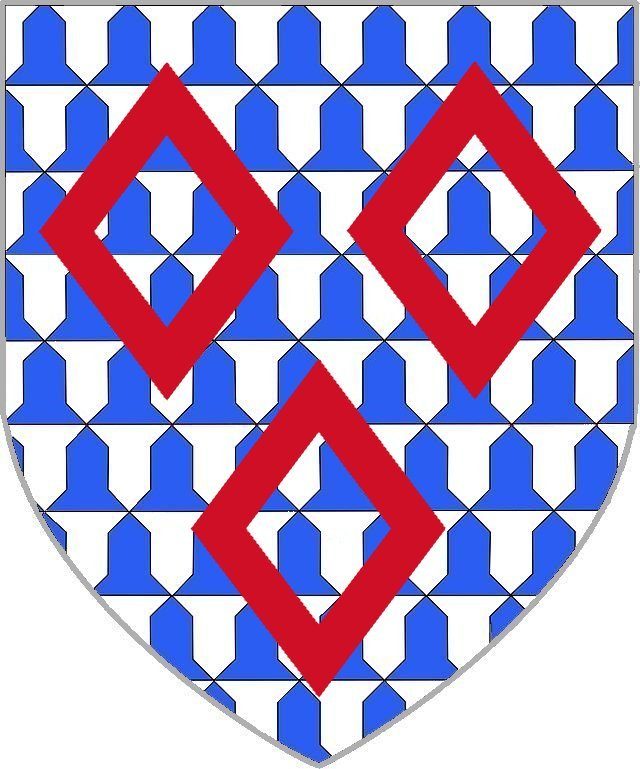
- Arms of Marmion of Oxfordshire:- vair three mascles gules 2 and 1 :variation = three lozenges gules

MP for Gloucester
- In office 17 October 1491 – 5 March 1492
- Monarch: Henry VII

Personal details
- Born: 1461
- Died: 9 April 1529 (aged 67–68) Gloucester
- Spouse: Isabel
- Children: Anthony Marmion
- Parent: William Marmion

William Marmion (c. 1461 – 1529) of Adwell was an English gentleman who served as one of the Members of Parliament for Gloucester in 1491.

== Career and Life ==
He was the son of William Marmion of Henley-on-Thames, Steward of Dorchester Abbey and Recorder of Oxford.

William Marmion was elected to Parliament on 17 October 1491.

He was the grandfather of John Marmion MP for Cricklade in 1558.

== Bibliography ==
- Baker, John (2012). The Men of Court 1440-1550. London: Selden Society.
- Burke, Bernard (1884). Burkes General Armoury. London: Burkes.
- Foster, Joseph (1902). Some Feudal Coats of Arms. London: J.Parker & Co.
- Wedgwood, Josiah (1936). History of Parliament 1439-1509 Biographies. London: HMSO.
