= John Marmion (Cricklade MP) =

16th-century English politician

MP for Cricklade
- In office 20 Jan 1558 – 17 November 1558
- Monarch: Mary I

Personal details
- Born: bef. 1519
- Died: c. 1581
- Spouse: Cecily Slythurst
- Parent: Anthony Marmion

John Marmion (bef. 1519 – c. 1581) was a Member of Parliament for Cricklade, Wiltshire.

== Career and life ==
Marmion was the eldest son of Anthony Marmion of Adwell, Eastington and Upton St. Leonards, Gloucestershire and the grandson of William Marmion, one of the MPs for Gloucester in 1491. He was summoned to Parliament on 20 Jan 1558. He became indebted to Sir Robert Doyley and was outlawed by 1581. What happened to him subsequently is unknown.

== Bibliography ==
- Bindoff, Stanley (1982). The History of Parliament: the House of Commons 1509-1558. London: Boydell and Brewer.
