= Edmund Marmion =

English etcher and printmaker (fl. 1650–1653)

Edmund Marmion (fl. 1650–1653) was an English etcher and printmaker.

== Sources ==
- "Edmund Marmion". The British Museum. Accessed 16 May 2023.
