= Robert Marmion, 3rd Baron Marmion of Tamworth =

12th and 13th-century Anglo-Norman baron and sheriff

Sir Robert Marmion
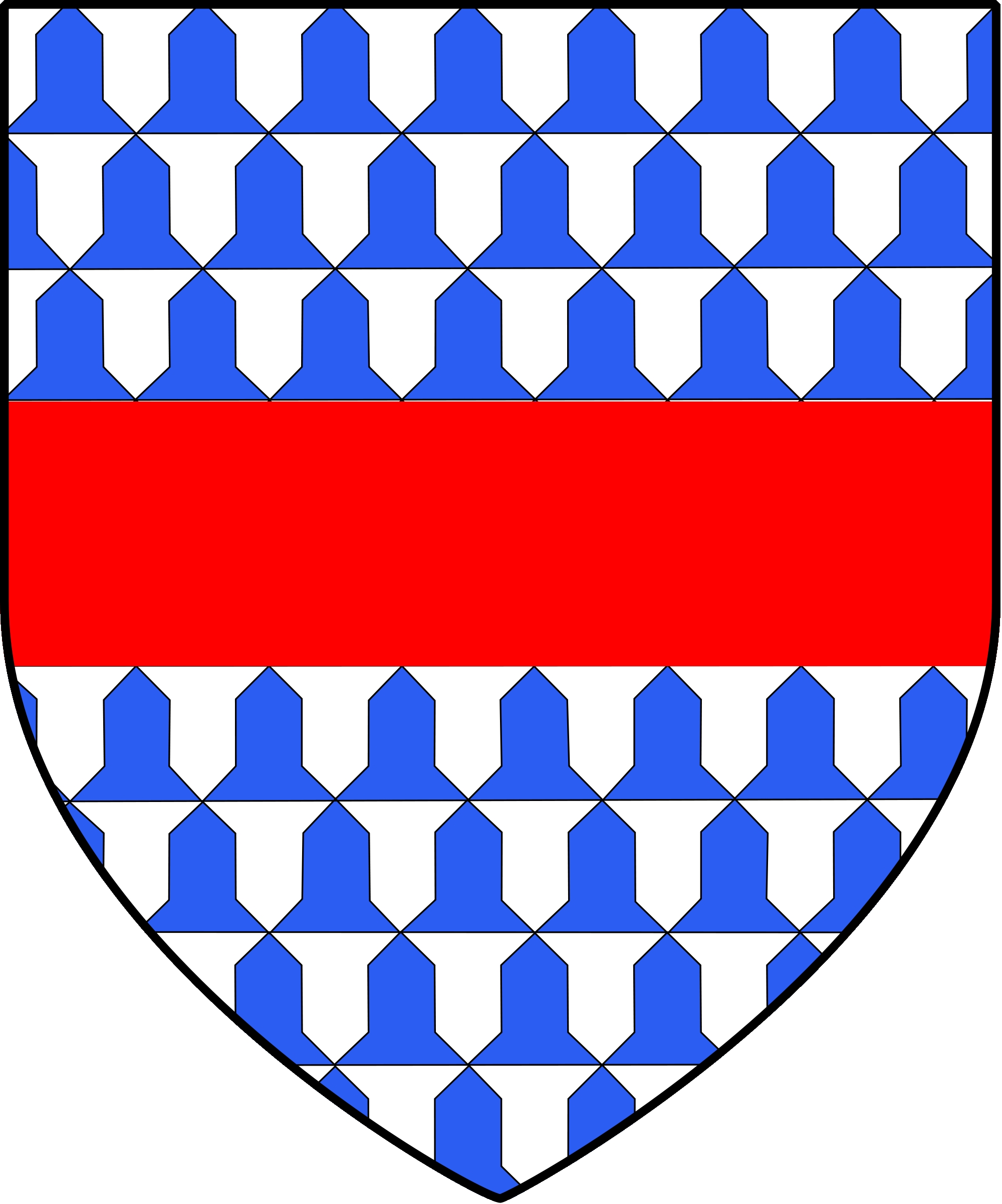
- Marmion of Tamworth:- vair, a fess gules

Itinerant Justice
- In office 1184–1205
- Monarchs: Henry II, Richard I, John

Sheriff of Worcestershire
- In office 1185–1190
- Monarchs: Henry II, Richard I

Personal details
- Died: bef. 15 May 1218
- Spouse(s): 1. Matilda/Maud de Beauchamp, 2. Phillippa
- Parent(s): Robert Marmion & Elizabeth? (de Rethel?)

Robert Marmion, 3rd Baron Marmion of Tamworth (died 1218) was an Anglo-Norman nobleman and itinerant justice. He was reputed to have been the King's Champion but his grandson, Phillip, is the first Marmion to have a solid claim to this. Robert was descended from the lords of Fontenay-le-Marmion in Normandy, who are said to have been hereditary champions of the Dukes of Normandy.

== Career ==
Marmion first appears as a Justiciar at Caen in 1177, a year after founding a cistern abbey, on the borders of Barbery & Bretteville-sur-Laize. He was one of the justices before whom fines were levied in 1184, and from 1185 to 1189 was Sheriff of Worcestershire. He was an itinerant justice for Warwickshire and Leicestershire in 1187-1188, Staffordshire in 1187–1192, Shropshire in 1187–1194, Herefordshire in 1188–1190, Worcestershire in 1189, Gloucestershire in 1189–1191 and 1193, and Bristol in 1194.

Marmion had taken the vow to join the crusade, but had bought his way out of it. In 1195 he was with Richard in Normandy, and in 1197 witnessed the treaty between Richard and Baldwin of Flanders. During the early years of John's reign he was in attendance on the king in Normandy. In 1204-1205 he was again one of the justices before whom fines were levied.

During the First Barons' War Marmion sided with the barons against the king, and Tamworth Castle was seized as a result. After John's death, Marmion rejoined the royal party under the nine-year old Henry III. He gave a mill at Barston, Warwickshire, to the Templars, and was a benefactor of Kirkstead Abbey, Lincolnshire.

Marmion died before 15 May 1218, whereupon his lands were placed in the custody of his younger son Robert Marmion the Younger until such time as his older brother Robert Marmion, 4th Baron Marmion of Tamworth dropped his support of the rebel barons and came into the King's peace.

== Family and descendants ==
Marmion first married Matilda de Beauchamp with whom he had the following children:

- Robert Marmion, 4th Baron Marmion of Tamworth (d.1241), of Tamworth, Scrivelsby and Normandy.
- daughter m. William de Lizures

and secondly, to Philippa, with whom he had the following children:

- Robert the Younger, of Winteringham, Coningsby and Tanfield.
- William, of Torrington and Normandy.

Palmer claimed that he had at least the following three additional sons:

- Geoffrey,
- Phllip (d. 1276)
- Manasser (aka Manser or Mauncer)

but no supporting evidence was quoted. Banks identified Geoffrey as actually being the son of Robert's eldest son and cited the College of Arms as evidence. Manasser is recorded as being the son of a Sir William Marmion in evidence submitted by the Marmion family of Galby and Keisby at the National Archives and this is confirmed by various petitions. Seeing as there is evidence to suggest that the identification of Geoffrey and Manasser as sons of Robert is dubious it also seems likely that Philip is also misplaced and that Robert had just three sons, i.e. Robert the elder, Robert the younger and William.

== Sources ==
- This article incorporates text from a publication now in the public domain: "Marmion, Robert". Dictionary of National Biography. London: Smith, Elder & Co. 1885–1900.
