= Robert Marmion (died 1242) =

13th-century English nobleman

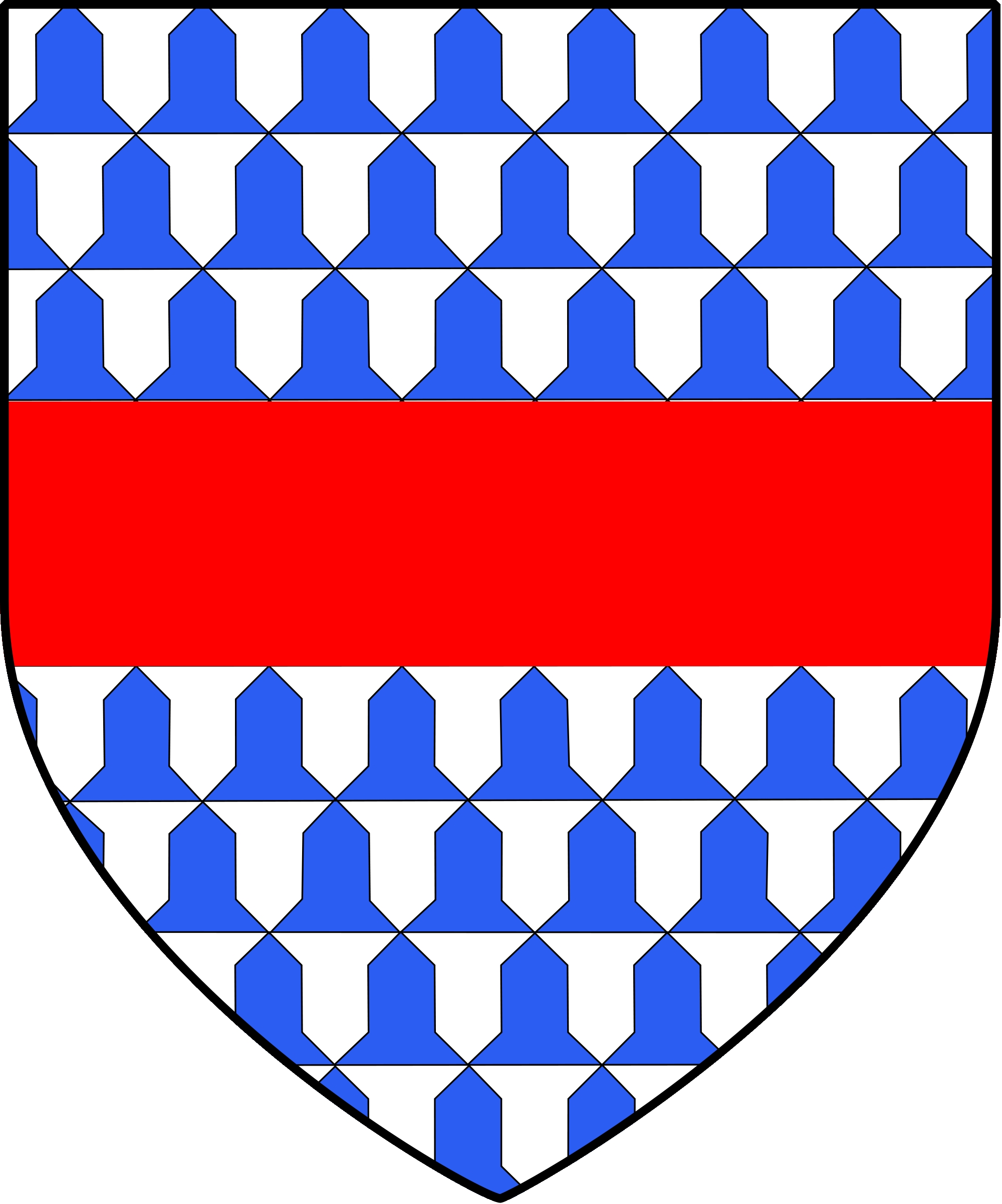
- Marmion of Winteringham:- vair, a fess gules
- Born: bef.1200
- Died: 1241; Barons' Crusade
- Spouse: Amicia/Avice Fitz-Hugh
- Issue: William Marmion
- Father: Robert Marmion, 3rd Baron Marmion of Tamworth
- Mother: Phillipa (surname unknown)

Robert Marmion was an Anglo-Norman nobleman and rebel involved in the First Barons' War. He was referred to as "Robert Marmion the Younger" as his elder half-brother was also called Robert and known as "Robert Marmion the Elder".

== Ancestry ==
Marmion was the son of Robert Marmion, 3rd Baron Marmion of Tamworth and his second wife Philippa (surname unknown).

== Career and life ==
In 1215 Marmion paid King John 350 pounds and five palfreys to marry Amicia/Avice the daughter of Jernigan Fitz-Hugh of West Tanfield from whom he gained lands in Yorkshire.

Marmion joined in the rebellion against King John who confiscated his lands. When John died his son Henry tried to restore calm and in 1217 the Sheriff of Sussex was ordered to give Marmion back his estates. On 15 May 1218 Marmion paid the king 500 pounds for custody of Tamworth and the rest of his elder brother Robert's lands as long as he continued to rebel. Robert the Elder finally made peace with the king in 1220 whereupon his lands, including Tamworth, were restored to him. Robert the Younger retained the lands at Winteringham, Coningsby, Quinton and Berwick which had been given to him by charter by his father.

In 1239 the abbot of Mont Saint-Michel claimed the right to Wath, which Marmion held by his wife. In the case heard by the king, Marmion offered to prove it was his in trial by combat and the abbot accepted. The combatants fought in a place chosen by the king, with Marmion bringing a large band of armed men with him. His champion was brought to the ground more than once but each time was rescued by his party. They eventually threatened to kill the abbot and his champion who, in fear of their lives, relinquished their claim to Wath.

Marmion accompanied Richard of Cornwall on the Barons' Crusade to the middle-east and died in 1241. He left an underage heir in the ward of William de Cantilupe. His widow claimed dower from lands at Wullingham from Ridel Papillon (Note: perhaps the King's escheator) and by the time of her death in 1282 was holding West Tanfield, Nosterfield and Richmond ward in Yorkshire.

== Family and descendants ==
Marmion married Amicia/Avice Fitz-Hugh and was succeeded by his son and heir:

- William Marmion, (d. 1274). Married Lorette, daughter of Richard FitzRoy and granddaughter of King John.

== Bibliography ==
- Burke, Bernard (1884). Burkes General Armoury. London: Burkes.
- Caley, John (1806). Calendarium Inquisitionum post mortem sive Escaetarum. Vol. 1. London: Record Commission.
- Cokayne, George Edward (1893). Complete Peerage. Vol. I. London: George Bell & Sons.
- Hill, Rosalind (1986). The Rolls and Register of Bishop Oliver Sutton, 1280–1299. Vol. VIII. Lincoln: Lincoln Record Society.
- Nicolas, Nicholas Harris; Courthope, William (1857). Historic Peerage of England. London: John Murray.
- Paris, Matthew (1866) [c. 1250]. Madden, Frederic (ed.). Historia Anglorum. Vol. II. London: Longman, Green, Reader and Dyer.
- Calendar of Inquisitions. Vol. I. London: HMSO. 1904.
- Calendar of entries in the Papal registers relating to Great Britain and Ireland. Papal letters. Vol. I. London: HMSO. 1893.
- Fine Rolls. Westminster: Parliament of England. 1199–1461.

Peerage of England
New creation	Baron Marmion of Winteringham	Succeeded by William Marmion
