= Fontenay-le-Marmion =

- Commune
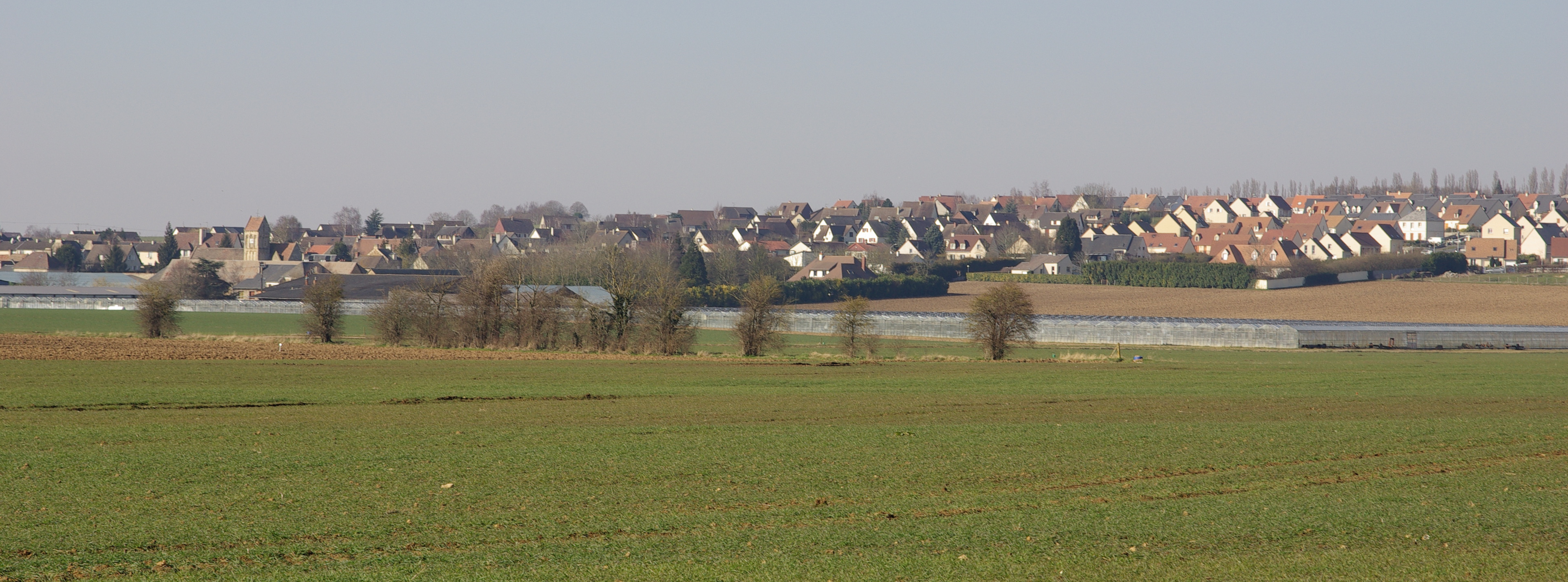
- A general view of Fontenay-le-Marmion

- Coat of arms
- Location of Fontenay-le-Marmion
- Location within France Location within Normandy
- Coordinates: 49°05′39″N 0°21′07″W
- Country: France
- Region: Normandy
- Department: Calvados
- Arrondissement: Caen
- Canton: Évrecy

Government
  - Mayor (2020–2026): David Guesnon
- Area^{1}: 10.16 km^{2} (3.92 sq mi)
- Elevation: 50 m (160 ft)
- Highest elevation: 92 m (302 ft)
- Lowest elevation: 17 m (56 ft)
- Population (2023): 2,055
  - Density: 202.3/km^{2} (523.9/sq mi)
- Time zone: UTC+01:00 (CET)
  - Summer (DST): UTC+02:00 (CEST)
- INSEE/Postal code: 14277 /14320
- ^{1} French Land Register data, which excludes lakes, ponds, glaciers > 1 km^{2} (0.386 sq mi or 247 acres) and river estuaries.

Fontenay-le-Marmion (French pronunciation: [fɔ̃tnɛ lə maʁmjɔ̃]) is a commune in the Calvados department in the Normandy region in northwestern France.

== Geography ==
The commune is made up of the following collection of villages and hamlets, Le Val, Les Cinq Fermes and Fontenay-le-Marmion.

A single watercourse, the Ruisseau du Val Distrait flows through the commune.

== Population ==
Historical population
Year	Pop.	±% p.a.
1968	1,045	—
1975	1,262	+2.73%
1982	1,408	+1.58%
1990	1,375	−0.30%
1999	1,470	+0.75%
2007	1,598	+1.05%
2012	1,677	+0.97%
2017	1,930	+2.85%
2023	2,055	+1.05%
Source: INSEE

== Points of Interest ==
=== National Heritage sites ===
The Commune has four buildings and areas listed as a Monument historique One building is a private house and the others are:

- Église Saint-Hermès de Fontenay-le-Marmion twelfth century church listed as a monument in 1911.
- Tumulus de la Hoguette a Neolithic Tumulus that was classed as a Monument historique in 1975.
- Tumulus dit Butte de la Hogue a Neolithic Tumulus that was classed as a Monument historique in 1905.

== Notable people ==
- Émile Legrand (1841 - 1903) a classical scholar was born here.

== Twin towns – sister cities ==
Fontenay-le-Marmion is twinned with:

- Chulmleigh, England, United Kingdom, since 1979.

== See also ==
- Communes of the Calvados department
- Baron Marmion
