= Keisby =

Hamlet in Lincolnshire, England

Coordinates: 52.844°N 0.459°W

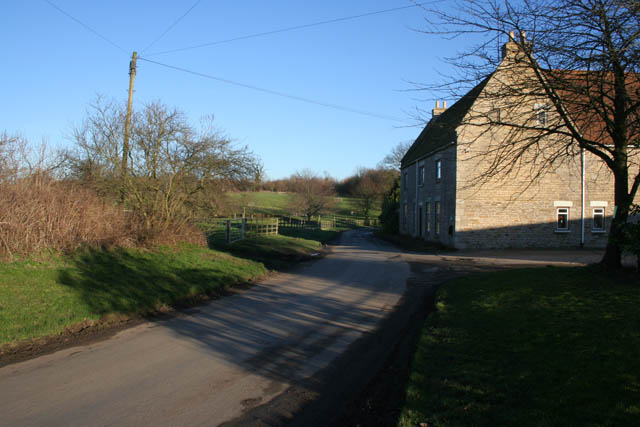
- Manor Farm House, Keisby

- Location within Lincolnshire
- OS grid reference: TF038285
  - London: 90 mi (140 km) S
- Civil parish: Lenton, Keisby and Osgodby
- District: South Kesteven
- Shire county: Lincolnshire
- Region: East Midlands
- Country: England
- Sovereign state: United Kingdom
- Post town: BOURNE
- Postcode district: PE10
- Dialling code: 01476
- Police: Lincolnshire
- Fire: Lincolnshire
- Ambulance: East Midlands
- UK Parliament: Grantham and Bourne

Keisby is a hamlet in the civil parish of Lenton, Keisby and Osgodby, in the South Kesteven district, in Lincolnshire, England. It is situated 6 miles (10 km) north-west from Bourne and 9 miles (14 km) south-east from Grantham. In 1921 the parish had a population of 72.

== History ==
Keisby comes from an Old Norse term meaning "Kisi's farmstead or village". The village is mentioned in the Domesday account, and has had different spellings over the years, from Chisebi to Kisebi and Kysebi.

The English surname Kisby (and variants) is believed to originate from Keisby.

Keisby was formerly a township in the parish of Lavington, in 1866 Keisby became a separate civil parish, on 1 April 1935 the parish was abolished to form "Lenton Keisby and Osgodby".

== Modern times ==
Keisby is part of the Lenton, Keisby and Osgodby ecclesiastical parish, and The North Beltisloe Group of parishes in the Deanery of Beltisloe. As of 2014 the incumbent is the Revd Mike Doyle. There is no separate church, services taking place in the parish church at Lenton.
