= Lenton, Keisby and Osgodby =

Civil parish in Lincolnshire, England

Lenton Keisby and Osgodby
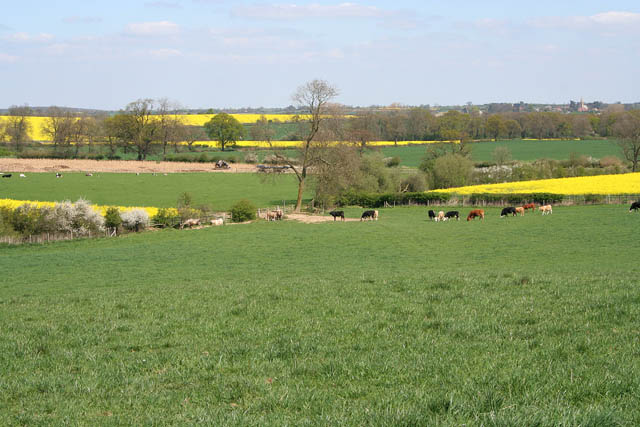
- Farmland at Osgodby Coppice, in the west of the parish

- Location within Lincolnshire
- Population: 187 (2011 census)
- Civil parish: Lenton Keisby and Osgodby
- District: South Kesteven
- Shire county: Lincolnshire
- Region: East Midlands
- Country: England
- Sovereign state: United Kingdom

Lenton, Keisby and Osgodby is a civil parish in South Kesteven, Lincolnshire, England. The population of the civil parish at the 2011 census was 187. It is located along the river and in the valleys of the East Glen at its headwaters near Ingoldsby, where several minor streams join.

== Geography ==
The highest land at the east and west is a small plateau of a Kellaways Sandstone laid down approximately 161 to 165 million years ago in the Jurassic Period. These lie some 80m above sea level. The East Glen valleys cut through this to a slightly older Blisworth Clay Mudstone layer, exposing thin layers on Kellaways clay and Cornbrash limestone on the way. The whole is overlaid with Quaternary glacial till from the recent Pleistocene. The lowest point in the parish is probably about 45m at the Ford in Osgodby, across the east Glen.

The streambeds of the Glen have their own associated alluvial linings of Sand And Gravel, Silt and Clay.

The parish was home to a Second World War airfield at Folkingham, which became a Cold War missile base.

The parish is crossed by the route of the Roman road of King street.

There are no major roads in the parish, and no railways.

== Constituent settlements ==
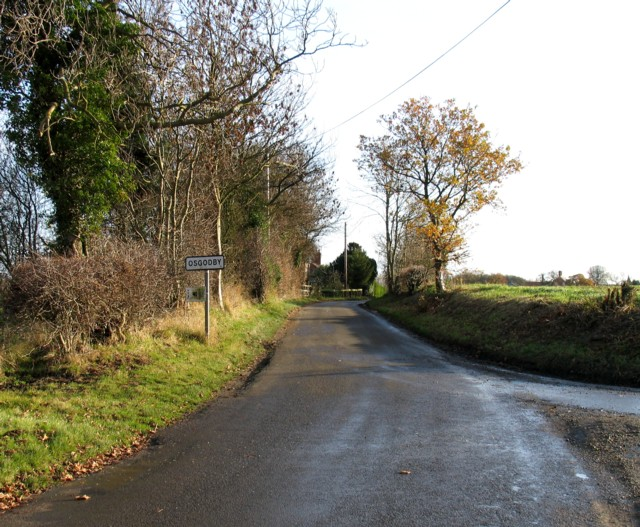
Modern Osgodby

The main village is

- Lenton (52°51′39″N 0°28′42″W)

and the hamlets of

- Keisby (52°50′38″N 0°27′29″W)
- Osgodby (52°50′28″N 0°28′44″W)
- Hanby (52°52′23″N 0°28′41″W)

=== Other locations ===
- Little Lavington (52°52′01″N 0°28′16″W)
  Former medieval village north of modern Lenton. The modern village of Lenton is sometimes called Lavington.
- Osgodby (52°50′24″N 0°29′10″W)
  Former medieval village near the old Manor and a few hundred metres west of the present hamlet
- Hanby (52°50′24″N 0°29′10″W)
  Former medieval village south-east of the present hamlet
